= List of Arrested Development episodes =

Arrested Development is an American satirical sitcom television series that originally aired on the Fox network from November 2, 2003, to February 10, 2006. Created by Mitchell Hurwitz, the show centers on the Bluth family, a formerly wealthy, habitually dysfunctional family, and is presented in a continuous format, incorporating hand-held camera work, narration, archival photos, and historical footage. The series stars Jason Bateman, Portia de Rossi, Will Arnett, Michael Cera, Alia Shawkat, Tony Hale, David Cross, Jeffrey Tambor, and Jessica Walter. Ron Howard serves as an executive producer on the show, as well as its narrator.

The first season consists of 22 episodes, which premiered on November 2, 2003, and concluded on June 6, 2004. Fox picked up a full 22-episode second season, which premiered on November 7, 2004, but its production order was later cut down to 18 episodes. The second season concluded on April 17, 2005. The show's third season premiered on September 19, 2005, and was also originally slated for 22 episodes, but the production order was later cut down to 13. The final four episodes of the series' original run were shown in a two-hour block on February 10, 2006, against NBC's coverage of the 2006 Winter Olympics opening ceremony. A total of 53 episodes of Arrested Development were produced over its original three seasons.

Since its debut, the series has won a variety of different awards including six Primetime Emmy Awards (including Outstanding Comedy Series in 2004), three Television Critics Association Awards, a Golden Globe Award, and a Writers Guild of America Award. Despite widespread approval from critics, Arrested Development never gained a sizable audience and was canceled by Fox in 2006.

In November 2011, however, it was announced that Netflix would license a new season. The fourth season of Arrested Development began filming in August 2012 and debuted on Netflix's streaming video service on May 26, 2013. Netflix announced on May 17, 2017, that it officially renewed the series for a fifth season, which consists of 16 episodes split into two eight-episode parts; the first half premiered on May 29, 2018, and the second half on March 15, 2019.

== Series overview ==
Season	Episodes		Originally released		
Season	Episodes		First released	Last released	Network
1	22		November 2, 2003	June 6, 2004	Fox
2	18		November 7, 2004	April 17, 2005	Fox
3	13		September 19, 2005	February 10, 2006	Fox
4	37 (Note: Sum of the original season 4 release and season 4 remix.)	15	May 26, 2013		Netflix
4	37	22	May 4, 2018		Netflix
5	16	8	May 29, 2018		Netflix
5	16	8	March 15, 2019		Netflix

== Episodes ==
=== Season 1 (2003–04) ===
The first season of Arrested Development consists of 22 episodes, which are listed below as ordered on the DVD collection and not in their original broadcast/production order.

No. overall	No. in season	Title	Directed by	Written by	Original release date	Prod. code	US viewers (millions)
1	1	"Pilot"	Anthony Russo & Joe Russo	Mitchell Hurwitz	November 2, 2003	1AJD79	7.98
2	2	"Top Banana"	Anthony Russo	Mitchell Hurwitz and John Levenstein	November 9, 2003	1AJD01	6.70
3	3	"Bringing Up Buster"	Joe Russo	Mitchell Hurwitz and Richard Rosenstock	November 16, 2003	1AJD02	5.78
4	4	"Key Decisions"	Anthony Russo	Brad Copeland	November 23, 2003	1AJD04	6.26
5	5	"Visiting Ours"	Greg Mottola	John Levenstein and Richard Rosenstock	December 7, 2003	1AJD03	6.31
6	6	"Charity Drive"	Greg Mottola	Barbie Feldman Adler	November 30, 2003	1AJD05	6.77
7	7	"My Mother, the Car"	Jay Chandrasekhar	Chuck Martin	December 21, 2003	1AJD07	6.42
8	8	"In God We Trust"	Joe Russo	Abraham Higginbotham	December 14, 2003	1AJD06	6.11
9	9	"Storming the Castle"	Greg Mottola	Brad Copeland	January 4, 2004	1AJD08	5.72
10	10	"Pier Pressure"	Joe Russo	Jim Vallely & Mitchell Hurwitz	January 11, 2004	1AJD09	7.21
11	11	"Public Relations"	Lee Shallat Chemel	Courtney Lilly	January 25, 2004	1AJD10	6.37
12	12	"Marta Complex"	Joe Russo	John Levenstein & Jim Vallely	February 8, 2004	1AJD11	4.89
13	13	"Beef Consommé"	Jay Chandrasekhar	Chuck Martin & Richard Rosenstock	February 15, 2004	1AJD12	5.21
14	14	"Shock and Aww"	Joe Russo	Jim Vallely & Chuck Martin	March 7, 2004	1AJD13	6.42
15	15	"Staff Infection"	John Fortenberry	Brad Copeland	March 14, 2004	1AJD14	5.37
16	16	"Missing Kitty"	Joe Russo	Mitchell Hurwitz & John Levenstein	March 28, 2004	1AJD15	5.51
17	17	"Altar Egos"	Jay Chandrasekhar	Barbie Feldman Adler	March 17, 2004	1AJD16	9.62
18	18	"Justice Is Blind"	Jay Chandrasekhar	Abraham Higginbotham	March 21, 2004	1AJD17	7.02
19	19	"Best Man for the Gob"	Lee Shallat Chemel	Mitchell Hurwitz & Richard Rosenstock	April 4, 2004	1AJD18	5.51
20	20	"Whistler's Mother"	Paul Feig	John Levenstein & Jim Vallely	April 11, 2004	1AJD19	5.39
21	21	"Not Without My Daughter"	Lee Shallat Chemel	Mitchell Hurwitz & Richard Rosenstock	April 25, 2004	1AJD20	5.66
22	22	"Let 'Em Eat Cake"	Paul Feig	Mitchell Hurwitz & Jim Vallely	June 6, 2004	1AJD21	5.08

=== Season 2 (2004–05) ===
The second season of Arrested Development consists of 18 episodes, which are listed below as ordered on the DVD collection and not in their original production order.

No. overall	No. in season	Title	Directed by	Written by	Original release date	Prod. code	US viewers (millions)
23	1	"The One Where Michael Leaves"	Lee Shallat Chemel	Mitchell Hurwitz & Richard Rosenstock	November 7, 2004	2AJD01	6.61
24	2	"The One Where They Build a House"	Patty Jenkins	Mitchell Hurwitz & Jim Vallely	November 14, 2004	2AJD02	7.22
25	3	"¡Amigos!"	Lee Shallat Chemel	Brad Copeland	November 21, 2004	2AJD03	5.89
26	4	"Good Grief"	Jeff Melman	John Levenstein	December 5, 2004	2AJD04	6.66
27	5	"Sad Sack"	Peter Lauer	Barbie Adler	December 12, 2004	2AJD05	6.28
28	6	"Afternoon Delight"	Jason Bateman	Abraham Higginbotham & Chuck Martin	December 19, 2004	2AJD06	5.62
29	7	"Switch Hitter"	Paul Feig	Story by : Courtney Lilly; Teleplay by : Barbie Adler	January 16, 2005	2AJD07	5.78
30	8	"Queen for a Day"	Andrew Fleming	Brad Copeland	January 23, 2005	2AJD08	5.20
31	9	"Burning Love"	Paul Feig	Chuck Martin & Lisa Parsons	January 30, 2005	2AJD09	6.96
32	10	"Ready, Aim, Marry Me!"	Paul Feig	Jim Vallely & Mitchell Hurwitz	February 13, 2005	2AJD10	5.61
33	11	"Out on a Limb"	Danny Leiner	Chuck Martin & Jim Vallely	March 6, 2005	2AJD11	6.34
34	12	"Hand to God"	Joe Russo	Mitchell Hurwitz & Chuck Martin	March 6, 2005	2AJD12	5.75
35	13	"Motherboy XXX"	Joe Russo	Mitchell Hurwitz & Jim Vallely	March 13, 2005	2AJD13	6.08
36	14	"The Immaculate Election"	Anthony Russo	Barbie Adler & Abraham Higginbotham	March 20, 2005	2AJD14	5.73
37	15	"Sword of Destiny"	Peter Lauer	Brad Copeland	March 27, 2005	2AJD17	4.72
38	16	"Meat the Veals"	Joe Russo	Barbie Adler & Richard Rosenstock	April 3, 2005	2AJD15	5.33
39	17	"Spring Breakout"	Anthony Russo	Barbie Adler & Abraham Higginbotham	April 10, 2005	2AJD16	5.19
40	18	"Righteous Brothers"	Chuck Martin	Mitchell Hurwitz & Jim Vallely	April 17, 2005	2AJD18	5.99

=== Season 3 (2005–06) ===
The third season of Arrested Development consists of 13 episodes, which are listed below as ordered on the DVD collection and not in their original production order.

No. overall	No. in season	Title	Directed by	Written by	Original release date	Prod. code	US viewers (millions)
41	1	"The Cabin Show"	Paul Feig	Mitchell Hurwitz & Jim Vallely	September 19, 2005	3AJD01	4.62
42	2	"For British Eyes Only"	John Fortenberry	Mitchell Hurwitz & Richard Day	September 26, 2005	3AJD02	4.02
43	3	"Forget-Me-Now"	John Amodeo	Tom Saunders	October 3, 2005	3AJD03	4.47
44	4	"Notapusy"	Lev L. Spiro	Ron Weiner	November 7, 2005	3AJD04	4.19
45	5	"Mr. F"	Arlene Sanford	Richard Day & Jim Vallely	November 7, 2005	3AJD05	3.94
46	6	"The Ocean Walker"	Paul Feig	Jake Farrow & Sam Laybourne	December 5, 2005	3AJD06	4.09
47	7	"Prison Break-In"	Robert Berlinger	Karey Dornetto	December 12, 2005	3AJD08	3.91
48	8	"Making a Stand"	Peter Lauer	Mitchell Hurwitz & Chuck Tatham	December 19, 2005	3AJD07	4.14
49	9	"S.O.B.s"	Robert Berlinger	Richard Day & Jim Vallely	January 2, 2006	3AJD09	4.16
50	10	"Fakin' It"	Lev L. Spiro	Dean Lorey and Chuck Tatham	February 10, 2006	3AJD10	3.14
51	11	"Family Ties"	Robert Berlinger	Ron Weiner	February 10, 2006	3AJD11	3.18
52	12	"Exit Strategy"	Rebecca E. Asher	Mitchell Hurwitz & Jim Vallely	February 10, 2006	3AJD12	3.47
53	13	"Development Arrested"	John Fortenberry	Story by : Richard Day & Mitchell Hurwitz; Teleplay by : Chuck Tatham & Jim Vallely	February 10, 2006	3AJD13	3.43

=== Season 4 (2013) ===
Six years after the show had been canceled by Fox, filming for a revived fourth season began on August 7, 2012. The season consists of 15 new episodes, which debuted at the same time on Netflix on May 26, 2013, in North and South America, UK, Ireland, and the Nordics. A 22-episode recut titled Arrested Development Season 4 Remix: Fateful Consequences was released on May 3, 2018.

No. overall	No. in season	Title	Featured character	Directed by	Written by	Original release date	Prod. code
54	1	"Flight of the Phoenix"	Michael	Mitchell Hurwitz and Troy Miller	Mitchell Hurwitz	May 26, 2013	4AJD01
55	2	"Borderline Personalities"	George Sr.	Mitchell Hurwitz and Troy Miller	Jim Vallely & Richard Rosenstock	May 26, 2013	4AJD03
56	3	"Indian Takers"	Lindsay	Mitchell Hurwitz and Troy Miller	Caroline Williams & Dean Lorey	May 26, 2013	4AJD05
57	4	"The B. Team"	Michael	Troy Miller and Mitchell Hurwitz	Mitchell Hurwitz & Jim Vallely	May 26, 2013	4AJD02
58	5	"A New Start"	Tobias	Mitchell Hurwitz and Troy Miller	Dean Lorey & Jim Vallely	May 26, 2013	4AJD07
59	6	"Double Crossers"	George Sr.	Troy Miller and Mitchell Hurwitz	Dean Lorey & Richard Rosenstock	May 26, 2013	4AJD04
60	7	"Colony Collapse"	Gob	Troy Miller and Mitchell Hurwitz	Mitchell Hurwitz & Jim Vallely	May 26, 2013	4AJD08
61	8	"Red Hairing"	Lindsay	Troy Miller and Mitchell Hurwitz	Caroline Williams & Richard Rosenstock	May 26, 2013	4AJD06
62	9	"Smashed"	Tobias	Mitchell Hurwitz and Troy Miller	Dean Lorey & Richard Rosenstock	May 26, 2013	4AJD15
63	10	"Queen B."	Lucille	Troy Miller and Mitchell Hurwitz	Richard Rosenstock & Dean Lorey	May 26, 2013	4AJD10
64	11	"A New Attitude"	Gob	Mitchell Hurwitz and Troy Miller	Mitchell Hurwitz & Jim Vallely	May 26, 2013	4AJD14
65	12	"Señoritis"	Maeby	Mitchell Hurwitz and Troy Miller	Jim Brandon & Brian Singleton	May 26, 2013	4AJD09
66	13	"It Gets Better"	George-Michael	Troy Miller and Mitchell Hurwitz	Dean Lorey & Richard Rosenstock	May 26, 2013	4AJD12
67	14	"Off the Hook"	Buster	Mitchell Hurwitz and Troy Miller	Jim Vallely & Mitchell Hurwitz	May 26, 2013	4AJD11
68	15	"Blockheads"	George-Michael	Mitchell Hurwitz and Troy Miller	Mitchell Hurwitz & Jim Vallely	May 26, 2013	4AJD13

=== Season 4 Remix: Fateful Consequences (2018) ===
No.	Title	Directed by	Written by	Original release date	Prod. code
1	"Re Cap'n Bluth"	Mitchell Hurwitz and Troy Miller	Mitchell Hurwitz, Dean Lorey, Richard Rosenstock, Jim Vallely, Caroline Williams	May 3, 2018	RAJD01
2	"Three Half Men"	Troy Miller and Mitchell Hurwitz	Mitchell Hurwitz, Richard Rosenstock, Jim Vallely	May 3, 2018	RAJD02
3	"A Couple-A New Starts"	Mitchell Hurwitz and Troy Miller	Mitchell Hurwitz, Dean Lorey, Jim Vallely, Caroline Williams	May 3, 2018	RAJD03
4	"Just Deserters"	Troy Miller and Mitchell Hurwitz	Mitchell Hurwitz, Dean Lorey, Richard Rosenstock, Jim Vallely	May 3, 2018	RAJD04
5	"A Trial Run"	Mitchell Hurwitz and Troy Miller	Mitchell Hurwitz, Dean Lorey, Richard Rosenstock, Jim Vallely, Caroline Williams	May 3, 2018	RAJD05
6	"The Parent Traps"	Troy Miller and Mitchell Hurwitz	Mitchell Hurwitz, Dean Lorey, Richard Rosenstock, Jim Vallely	May 3, 2018	RAJD06
7	"One Degree of Separation"	Mitchell Hurwitz and Troy Miller	Jim Brandon, Dean Lorey, Richard Rosenstock, Brian Singleton, Jim Vallely, Caroline Williams	May 3, 2018	RAJD07
8	"The Weak Become the Strong"	Troy Miller and Mitchell Hurwitz	Jim Brandon, Mitchell Hurwitz, Richard Rosenstock, Brian Singleton, Jim Vallely, Caroline Williams	May 3, 2018	RAJD08
9	"Modern Marvels"	Mitchell Hurwitz and Troy Miller	Mitchell Hurwitz, Dean Lorey, Jim Vallely, Caroline Williams	May 3, 2018	RAJD09
10	"Recurring Dreams"	Troy Miller and Mitchell Hurwitz	Jim Brandon, Mitchell Hurwitz, Dean Lorey, Richard Rosenstock, Brian Singleton, Jim Vallely	May 3, 2018	RAJD10
11	"Fun Night"	Mitchell Hurwitz and Troy Miller	Jim Brandon, Mitchell Hurwitz, Dean Lorey, Richard Rosenstock, Brian Singleton, Jim Vallely, Caroline Williams	May 3, 2018	RAJD11
12	"Moving Pictures"	Troy Miller and Mitchell Hurwitz	Mitchell Hurwitz, Dean Lorey, Richard Rosenstock, Jim Vallely, Caroline Williams	May 3, 2018	RAJD12
13	"Get on Up"	Mitchell Hurwitz and Troy Miller	Mitchell Hurwitz, Dean Lorey, Richard Rosenstock, Jim Vallely	May 3, 2018	RAJD13
14	"What Goes Around"	Troy Miller and Mitchell Hurwitz	Mitchell Hurwitz, Dean Lorey, Richard Rosenstock, Jim Vallely	May 3, 2018	RAJD14
15	"Locked and Loaded"	Mitchell Hurwitz and Troy Miller	Jim Brandon, Mitchell Hurwitz, Dean Lorey, Richard Rosenstock, Brian Singleton, Caroline Williams	May 3, 2018	RAJD15
16	"Mixed Messages"	Troy Miller and Mitchell Hurwitz	Mitchell Hurwitz, Dean Lorey, Richard Rosenstock, Jim Vallely	May 3, 2018	RAJD16
17	"Dire Straights"	Mitchell Hurwitz and Troy Miller	Jim Brandon, Mitchell Hurwitz, Dean Lorey, Richard Rosenstock, Brian Singleton, Caroline Williams	May 3, 2018	RAJD17
18	"Turning on Each Other"	Troy Miller and Mitchell Hurwitz	Mitchell Hurwitz, Dean Lorey, Richard Rosenstock, Jim Vallely, Caroline Williams	May 3, 2018	RAJD18
19	"Fast Company"	Mitchell Hurwitz and Troy Miller	Jim Brandon, Mitchell Hurwitz, Dean Lorey, Richard Rosenstock, Brian Singleton	May 3, 2018	RAJD19
20	"Cinco de Cuatro I"	Troy Miller and Mitchell Hurwitz	Jim Brandon, Mitchell Hurwitz, Dean Lorey, Richard Rosenstock, Brian Singleton, Jim Vallely, Caroline Williams	May 3, 2018	RAJD20
21	"Cinco de Cuatro II"	Mitchell Hurwitz and Troy Miller	Mitchell Hurwitz, Dean Lorey, Richard Rosenstock, Jim Vallely	May 3, 2018	RAJD21
22	"Cinco de Cuatro III"	Troy Miller and Mitchell Hurwitz	Mitchell Hurwitz, Dean Lorey, Richard Rosenstock, Jim Vallely, Caroline Williams	May 3, 2018	RAJD22

=== Season 5 (2018–19) ===
No. overall	No. in season	Title	Directed by	Written by	Original release date	Prod. code
Part 1
69	1	"Family Leave"	Troy Miller	Mitchell Hurwitz & Jim Vallely	May 29, 2018	5AJD01
70	2	"Self-Deportation"	Troy Miller	Richard Day	May 29, 2018	5AJD02
71	3	"Everyone Gets Atrophy"	Troy Miller	Mitchell Hurwitz	May 29, 2018	5AJD03
72	4	"An Old Start"	Troy Miller	Jim Vallely	May 29, 2018	5AJD04
73	5	"Sinking Feelings"	Troy Miller	Jim Vallely & Mitchell Hurwitz	May 29, 2018	5AJD05
74	6	"Emotional Baggage"	Troy Miller	Evan Mann & Gareth Reynolds	May 29, 2018	5AJD06
75	7	"Rom-Traum"	Troy Miller	Maggie Rowe	May 29, 2018	5ADJ07
76	8	"Premature Independence"	Troy Miller	Mitchell Hurwitz & Jim Vallely	May 29, 2018	5ADJ08
Part 2
77	9	"Unexpected Company"	Troy Miller	Hallie Cantor	March 15, 2019	5AJD09
78	10	"Taste Makers"	Troy Miller	Mitchell Hurwitz	March 15, 2019	5AJD10
79	11	"Chain Migration"	Troy Miller	Richard Day	March 15, 2019	5AJD11
80	12	"Check Mates"	Troy Miller	Evan Mann & Gareth Reynolds	March 15, 2019	5AJD12
81	13	"The Untethered Sole"	Troy Miller	Chris Marrs	March 15, 2019	5AJD13
82	14	"Saving for Arraignment Day"	Troy Miller	Hallie Cantor	March 15, 2019	5AJD14
83	15	"Courting Disasters"	Troy Miller	Mitchell Hurwitz & Jim Vallely	March 15, 2019	5AJD15
84	16	"The Fallout"	Troy Miller	Mitchell Hurwitz	March 15, 2019	5AJD16
