= The One Where Michael Leaves =

1st episode of the 2nd season of Arrested Development

- Arrested Development episode
- Tobias, painted in blue, speaks to Michael.
- Episode no.: Season 2 Episode 1
- Directed by: Lee Shallat Chemel
- Written by: Mitchell Hurwitz; Richard Rosenstock
- Cinematography by: Greg Harrington
- Editing by: Robert Bramwell
- Production code: 2AJD01
- Original air date: November 7, 2004
- Running time: 22 minutes

Guest appearances
- Henry Winkler as Barry Zuckerkorn; Ed Helms as James Carr; Ian Roberts as Doctor Fishman

Episode chronology
← Previous "Let 'Em Eat Cake"	Next → "The One Where They Build a House"
- Arrested Development season 2

"The One Where Michael Leaves" is the second season premiere of the American television satirical sitcom Arrested Development. It was written by series creator Mitchell Hurwitz and co-executive producer Richard Rosenstock, and was directed by Lee Shallat Chemel. It originally aired on the Fox Network in the United States on November 7, 2004.

The series, narrated by Ron Howard, follows the Bluths, a formerly wealthy dysfunctional family in Southern California who made their money from property development. In the episode, Michael (Jason Bateman) and his son George Michael (Michael Cera) leave for Phoenix, but they decide to go back in order to make a more dramatic exit. Michael's sister Lindsay's (Portia de Rossi) desire for an open marriage leads her husband Tobias Fünke (David Cross) to inadvertently audition for the Blue Man Group, thinking they are a support group for depressed men. Michael's mother Lucille (Jessica Walter) signs her youngest son Buster (Tony Hale) up for the Army after being goaded by a documentary filmmaker who questions her patriotism, and oldest son Gob (Will Arnett) is made president of the Bluth company, discovering a contract between his father George Sr. (Jeffrey Tambor) and Saddam Hussein.

Cross found wearing blue paint for the episode to be difficult, as the process of applying and taking off the paint proved tedious. The Blue Man Group assisted with production, only asking that the series correctly represent their mysterious appearance. A cameo of Cross dressed in his Blue Man Group attire from the episode was intended to appear in the 2018 film Avengers: Infinity War, but was cancelled due to Cross's directing commitments. Upon release, "The One Where Michael Leaves" received mostly positive reviews from critics, with some including it in their lists of the series' greatest episodes. Critics praised the episode's humor, but some of its sub-plots drew criticism. Several critics and scholars have analyzed the episode's themes since its release.

== Plot ==
Michael takes his son George Michael to start a new life in Phoenix, Arizona, without saying goodbye to the family. When he realizes that the impact of his departure might have been lost on them, he returns to inform them that he is leaving. His older brother, Gob, and his sister, Lindsay, speculate that Michael needs them more than they need him. Michael, frustrated that no one is taking him seriously, gets pulled over once on the road again, with the police informing him that his father, George Sr., has been caught and arrested for his involvement in illegal property development in Iraq. Michael decides to return a second time to tell his father he is leaving.

The police have actually arrested George Sr.'s twin brother Oscar, and lawyer Barry Zuckerkorn tells Michael he cannot leave the state without paying bail, so Michael goes looking for the company checkbook. At the office, Gob is redecorating, and Michael learns from him that their mother Lucille has the checkbook. After Michael leaves, Gob stumbles upon a briefcase containing a contract between George Sr. and Saddam Hussein. Lindsay and her husband Tobias Fünke decide to try an "open marriage", and Lindsay makes what she thinks is a date but is actually an appointment with a realtor. Tobias spots a flyer and attends what he assumes is a support group for depressed men, but is really a performance of the Blue Man Group, where he decides to audition.

Lucille is questioned by a documentary filmmaker, who inquires about the family's patriotism, asking whether she would ever enlist her son or daughter in the army, and she immediately signs up her youngest son Buster. Michael realizes he must ask the family for the bail money, while Tobias leaves for the theater painted blue to audition for the Blue Man Group, but is accidentally run over by Barry Zuckerkorn. At the hospital, the family pours out their troubles and begs Michael for help, whilst Dr. Fishman subsequently announces that Tobias has survived. The police come and try to arrest Oscar, thinking he is George Sr. Michael explains the mixup, and Oscar leaves. Then, the real Oscar walks in, revealing that the other one was George Sr. in a wig, who has stolen the briefcase containing the Saddam Hussein contract and is planning to flee to Mexico.

== Production ==
"The One Where Michael Leaves" was directed by Lee Shallat Chemel, and written by series creator Mitchell Hurwitz and co-executive producer Richard Rosenstock. It was Hurwitz's ninth writing credit for the series, and the first episode of the season to be filmed.

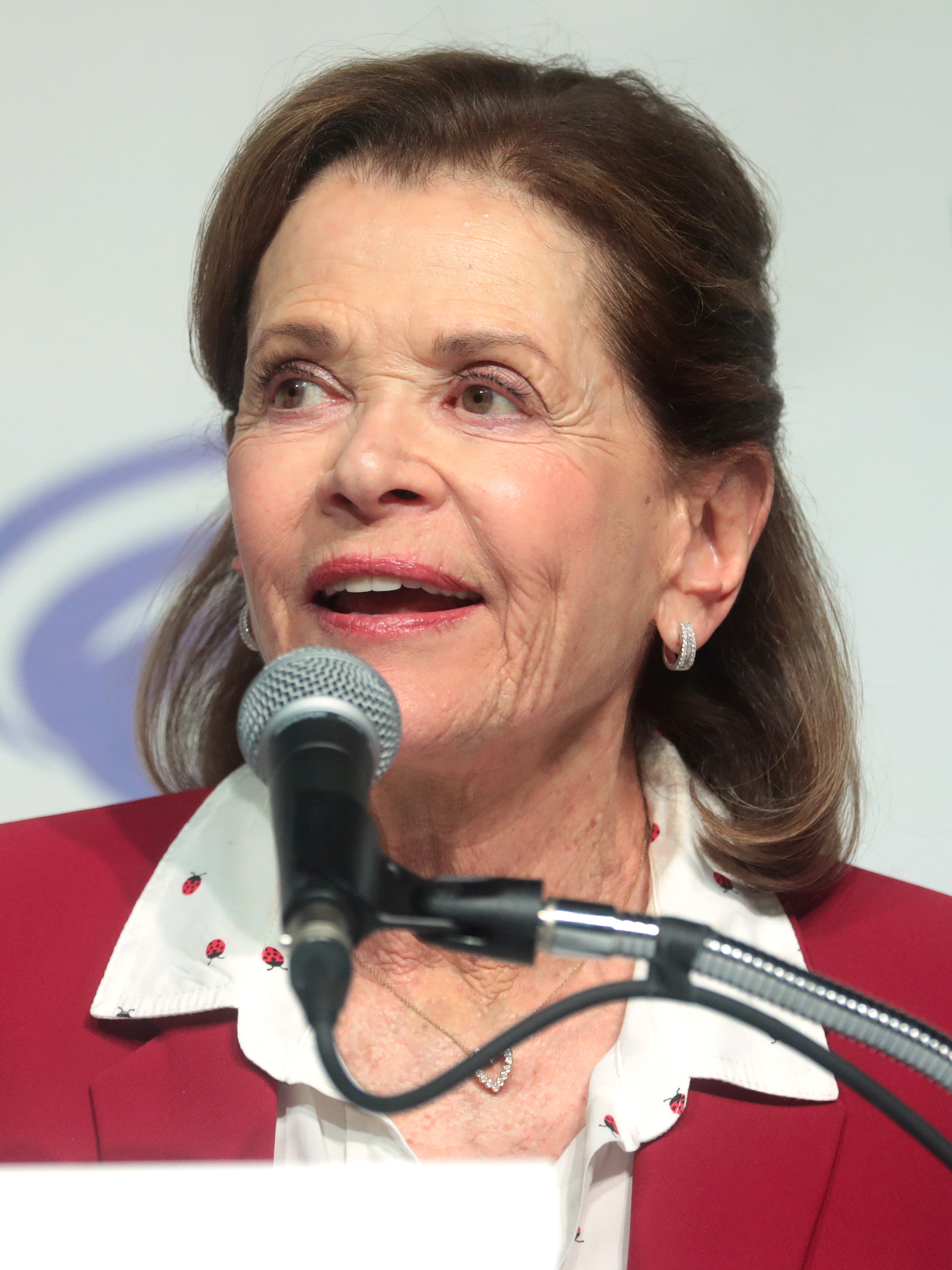
Jessica Walter, who portrays Lucille, in 2019

The episode features Lucille's double wink, (Note: Lucille's "double wink" is characterized by her keeping one eye completely open as she closes the other, and then repeating this action.) a callback to the series pilot. Actress Jessica Walter, who portrays Lucille, claims that the wink was incorporated into the script after she revealed she had the ability to do it. The episode's title format references the naming style of the sitcom Friends, which had finished airing six months prior. Hurwitz said in an interview that he often had to worry if his executive producers would reveal plot twists of the series internally that were meant to be kept secret from those outside of the staff, citing the Saddam Hussein property-building plot as an example. The episode was filmed in Los Angeles by Imagine Entertainment and 20th Century-Fox Film Corporation. When Hurwitz was conceiving the storyline of Buster losing his hand from a seal attack later in season two, he added lines foreshadowing the event early into the season, including the episode's gag of a seal attack being featured on the news.

The idea to incorporate the Blue Man Group into the series was suggested by composer David Schwartz, who, on the day of sound mixing for the first season finale, saw an ad for the group and suggested to David Cross that it could be used for George Sr.'s escape. The idea was quickly reworked so that Tobias, rather than George Sr., would be the one joining the group. The actual Blue Man Group assisted with production, asking only that the show preserve their air of mystery rather than portray them simply as actors. It was also their suggestion that Tobias behave as though he were already part of the group, even without having officially joined, a change Cross found funnier than the original plan. Multiple smudges of blue paint were added to the walls of the Bluth family home, with several reshoots required because Cross wanted the blue to appear more prominently on set. After "probably eight times," a staff meeting was held to remind him that sitcoms typically reset after each episode, leading the team to repaint only some of the walls to preserve continuity.

Cross shared that applying the blue paint for Tobias's Blue Man Group scenes was a hassle: it took a long time to apply the paint, and he was unable to touch anything afterwards due to it staining very easily. He often had to take as many as three showers to fully remove the paint—and, two years later, learned that actual members of the Blue Man Group simply wore face paint and blue unitards.

== Themes and analysis ==
Saloni Gajjar of The A.V. Club described "The One Where Michael Leaves" as mirroring the pilot, with the former reinforcing the general concept of the series and both placing a heavy emphasis on Michael's superiority complex. The scenes of Michael telling his family that he's leaving them to teach them a lesson, according to author Kristin M. Barton, showcase his insecurities and need to feel validated with his family's approval, motifs that have been in the series since the first episode. Author Caroline O'Donnell describes Tobias's misuse of the term "blue myself" (Note: When talking to Michael about how he has painted himself blue, Tobias says "I just blue myself".) as an example of the series' heavy emphasis on the theories of humor: it takes a relevantly simple line and makes it comedic with the subversion of expectations. The use of security footage to showcase George Sr.'s illicit acts were called by Barton as an example of the series making use of its documentary format. It uses footage that blurs the perpetrator's face—even though the audience is already aware of who George Sr. is—to add a sense of realism. As described by authors Christopher Kirby, Jonathan Hillard, and Mathew Holmes, Gob's insistence that he has never admitted to a mistake in his life perpetuates his inability to accept his true, selfish nature. He does not see a need to be truthful about his actions, and chooses to instead coast through life believing his own lies.

The episode continues the long running gag of Tobias's sexuality, incorporating it in more subtle ways; Tobias refers to him going back to a queen bed as "being back as a queen", a slang term used for homosexual men. In "The One Where Michael Leaves", Lindsay and Tobias attempt an open marriage, despite Tobias's insistence that they never work. This has been cited by authors Jessica Flanigan and Christopher Freiman in their book Libertarianism: The Basics as an example of irrational desires taking control of relationships. Darci Doll asserts that this exploration of Tobias and Lindsay's lack of sexuality when together perpetuates the stereotype that there is something inherently funny—or even wrong—about Tobias's possible homosexuality; the episode explores this lack of emotion when Lindsay opens up to Michael about how "awkward" her being with Tobias the night prior was.

== Release ==
A preview of "The One Where Michael Leaves", along with other episodes of the second season, was released onto Fox's official website in October 2004, several weeks prior to its premiere. The episode was first broadcast on November 7, 2004 on the Fox Network at 8:30 p.m. Eastern Standard Time in the United States. It was watched by 6.61 million viewers during its original airing. It received a 2.4% share among adults between the ages of 18 and 49, meaning that it was seen by 2.4% of all households in that demographic. The broadcast marked an increase in viewership from the previous episode, "Let 'Em Eat Cake", which had earned a 1.8% rating and drew in 5.08 million viewers.

"The One Where Michael Leaves" was first released on home video in the United States on October 11, 2005, in the Complete Second Season DVD box set. It, along with "Ready, Aim, Marry Me!" and "Sword of Destiny", are the only episodes of the set to not come with accompanying deleted scenes. In 2013, a soundtrack compiling every song from the first four seasons of the series entitled "At Long Last...Music and Songs From Arrested Development" was released, including the song "I'm Blue, Man" from the episode.

== Reception ==
"The One Where Michael Leaves" has garnered positive reception since release. The A.V. Club writer Noel Murray praised the episode, identifying Gob as the highlight of the episode. Murray stated that he had some of the "funniest and telling moments" of the episode. He criticized Lindsay's sub-plot, calling it a catalyst for the other unsatisfying Lindsay storylines in season two. Variety's Phil Gallo found the episode to be Arrested Development's funniest thus far, highlighting Lindsay and Tobias's unusual relationship, which he describes as personifying desperation. Gallo also praised Ron Howard's narration on the episode. Tom Shales of The Washington Post lauded Walter for her performance, singling out her double wink and "seamless" way of producing funny scenes.

Television writer Dave Holstein listed Tobias's trail of blue handprints on the Bluth family's wall as one of his favorite moments from the series, claiming that such background gags continue to influence his writing. Tobias's admiration for the Blue Man Group, which began in the episode, was included on Jillian Mapes of Rolling Stone's list of the series' 76 best running gags, highlighting his "signature" blue-painted body. Conversely, Austin Smith of the New York Post gave the episode a negative review, finding it vastly inferior to the quality of the first season. Smith expressed that he felt the series' previously unique format was already growing stale. Alessandra Stabley, writing for The New York Times, called the episode "very funny", but noted that the multiple storylines for each character are to the detriment of the episode, making the narrative confusing. Walter listed Buster's "Like anyone would ever want to 'R' her" line from the episode as her favorite moment in the entire series.

The episode has been included in lists detailing Arrested Development's best episodes. Brian Tallerico of Vulture placed it second in his list ranking every episode in the series, praising the writers for their confidence in the humor and noting that the entire cast delivered memorable performances. Chad Collins of SlashFilm placed it sixth on his list, commending its commitment to transgressive humor and its subversion of expectations through the Saddam Hussein plot.

=== Aftermath ===
Cross stated in an interview with The Hollywood Reporter that Tobias—in his Blue Man Group outfit from the episode—was intended to make a cameo appearance in Avengers: Infinity War, a film directed by Arrested Development alumni the Russo Brothers. Cross was in London directing a separate project, and was unable to film the appearance, and later expressed sorrow at being unable to do so. When asked which quote from the series fans mention to him most often, Cross said that people will shout, "I just blue myself" at him, often while driving.

== See also ==
- Production of Avengers: Infinity War and Avengers: Endgame
