= Motherboy XXX =

- Arrested Development episode
- Episode no.: Season 2 Episode 13
- Directed by: Joe Russo
- Written by: Mitchell Hurwitz; Jim Vallely
- Cinematography by: Greg Harrington
- Editing by: Robert Bramwell
- Production code: 2AJD13
- Original air date: March 13, 2005
- Running time: 22 minutes

Guest appearances
- Henry Winkler as Barry Zuckerkorn; Amy Poehler as Gob's Wife; Dave Attell as himself; Carl Weathers as himself

Episode chronology
← Previous "Hand to God"	Next → "The Immaculate Election"
- Arrested Development season 2

"Motherboy XXX" is the thirteenth episode of the second season of the American television satirical sitcom Arrested Development. It was written by series creator Mitchell Hurwitz and co-executive producer Jim Vallely, and was directed by Joe Russo. It originally aired on the Fox Network on March 13, 2005. The episode received mostly positive reviews from critics, with Hurwitz calling it his fourth favorite episode of the series. The series, narrated by Ron Howard, follows the Bluths, a formerly wealthy, dysfunctional family, who made their money from property development. In the episode, ashamed of Buster's missing hand, Lucille recruits George Michael to compete in the thirtieth annual "Motherboy" contest with her.

== Plot ==
Lucille (Jessica Walter) approaches Michael (Jason Bateman), asking him to be her partner to “Motherboy”, an annual mother-son dinner dance. In every year prior, she went with Buster (Tony Hale), but is embarrassed that he now has only one hand. Michael refuses to go with her. Meanwhile, George Michael (Michael Cera) is getting ready to go on a Christian camping trip with Ann (Mae Whitman). Upon hearing this, Michael tells him not to go and to instead visit Buster. Gob (Will Arnett) speaks with Michael about planning his divorce to his wife (Amy Poehler), who he married on a dare and barely remembers. He learns that the seal who bit off Buster's hand (owned by Gob's wife) had a tracking device on it, so he and Michael decide to go after it to try and recover Buster's hand for a transplant.

Tobias (David Cross) meets with Carl Weathers at a Burger King, speaking about a project Carl is working on about George Sr.'s (Jeffrey Tambor) escape from jail. He tells Tobias that in order to be in the episode, he needs to sign a release for the family. Later, George Michael meets Buster per his father’s request. While there, Lucille offers to take him out of town to the camping trip, and he complies. He soon learns that she is instead taking him to the Motherboy event. Having signed away his family’s life rights for the role of George Sr., Tobias begins research for the part. He sees George Sr. in the attic, who threatens him not to tell anyone of his whereabouts. When he hears of the show, he asks Tobias to act manly in the role.

Gob, Michael, and Buster arrive at the port where the seal’s tracking device had gone, only to find that the seal had been eaten by a shark, which carried the tracking device to the port. Buster mentions to Michael that George Michael had gone to Motherboy, and they both agree that they have to ‘save’ him from the event. Gob meets with his lawyer Barry (Henry Winkler), who tells him to say in court that he never consummated his marriage. Barry then says: "I missed breakfast, so I'm on my way to Burger King," and then jumps over the shark on the pier. Gob later meets with his wife and tells her that he plans to tell the court they never consummated the marriage, but they end up doing exactly that. Michael and Buster stake out the Motherboy dance, looking for a chance to create a diversion and take George Michael home. They confront Lucille, who takes on Buster as a dance partner when Michael leaves with his son. When Motherboy ends, Michael takes George Michael to the camping trip to see his girlfriend.

== Themes ==
=== Jumping the shark ===
Henry Winkler notes that Barry's "hopping" over the shark on the pier is a reference to the phrase "jumping the shark", which was coined by Jon Hein in response to the episode "Hollywood: Part 3" of the sitcom Happy Days (1974–1984), when Winkler's character Fonzie jumps over a shark while on water skis. Winkler notes that he is "the only actor, maybe in the world, that has jumped the shark twice — once on Happy Days, and once on Arrested Development.”

== Production ==
=== Development ===
"Motherboy XXX" was directed by Joe Russo, and written by series creator Mitchell Hurwitz and co-executive producer Jim Vallely. It was Russo's ninth directing credit Hurwitz's 13th writing credit and Valley's ninth writing credit. It was the thirteenth episode of the season to be filmed.

=== Burger King promotion ===
One of Fox's corporate sponsors was Burger King, who provided promotional consideration for Arrested Development. Carl Weathers informs Tobias that you can refill your drink for free at the restaurant, and Tobias calls it a "wonderful restaurant". A poster promoting the then-new Spicy Tendercrisp Chicken Sandwich can be seen in the background. The episode was originally titled "The Tendercrisp Chicken Comedy Half Hour".

== Reception ==
=== Viewers ===
In the United States, the episode was watched by 6.08 million viewers on its original broadcast.

=== Critical reception ===
The A.V. Club writer Noel Murray called the episode "one of the funniest and ballsiest episodes in the entire run of Arrested Development". In 2019, Brian Tallerico from Vulture ranked the episode as the sixth best of the whole series. Series creator Mitchell Hurwitz ranked "Motherboy XXX" as his fourth favorite episode of the show.

=== Accolades ===
Robert Bramwell was nominated for Outstanding Single-Camera Picture Editing for a Comedy Series at the 57th Primetime Emmy Awards for "Motherboy XXX". In her role as Lucille, Jessica Walter was nominated for Outstanding Supporting Actress in a Comedy Series for her appearance in the episode.
