= Out on a Limb (Arrested Development) =

- Arrested Development episode
- Episode no.: Season 2 Episode 11
- Directed by: Danny Leiner
- Written by: Chuck Martin; Jim Vallely
- Cinematography by: Greg Harrington
- Editing by: Robert Bramwell
- Production code: 2AJD11
- Original air date: March 6, 2005
- Running time: 22 minutes

Guest appearances
- Henry Winkler as Barry Zuckerkorn; Mae Whitman as Ann Veal; Christine Taylor as Sally Sitwell; Julia Louis-Dreyfus as Maggie Lizer

Episode chronology
← Previous "Ready, Aim, Marry Me!"	Next → "Hand to God"
- Arrested Development season 2

"Out on a Limb" is the eleventh episode of the second season of the American television satirical sitcom Arrested Development. It is the 33rd overall episode of the series, and was written by supervising producer Chuck Martin and co-executive producer Jim Vallely, and directed by Danny Leiner. It originally aired on Fox on February 13, 2005, airing back-to-back with the follow-up episode, "Hand to God".

The series, narrated by Ron Howard, follows the Bluths, a formerly wealthy, dysfunctional family, who made their money from property development. The Bluth family consists of Michael, his twin sister Lindsay, his older brother Gob, his younger brother Buster, their mother Lucille and father George Sr., as well as Michael's son George Michael, and Lindsay and her husband Tobias' daughter Maeby. In the episode, Gob's wife files for divorce. Michael learns that former lover (and known liar) Maggie Lizer is pregnant, so he has Tobias and Lindsay break into her house to collect a urine sample to confirm her pregnancy. Buster swims in the ocean and has his hand bitten off by a loose seal.

== Plot ==
Michael (Jason Bateman) and Sally Sitwell (Christine Taylor), who have started dating, have brunch, during which Michael spots George Michael (Michael Cera) and Maeby (Alia Shawkat) at the same restaurant and introduces Sally to them. Ann (Mae Whitman) finds George Michael, who she thought was skipping church to work. Michael and Lindsay (Portia de Rossi) discuss his relationship with Sally when Gob (Will Arnett) interrupts to announce that he's being sued for divorce from his wife (Amy Poehler). Buster (Tony Hale) tells Lucille (Jessica Walter) and Oscar (Jeffrey Tambor) that he is being shipped off to Iraq. Michael and Gob track down Barry Zuckerkorn (Henry Winkler) to help with Gob's divorce, and Barry mentions that the attorney for the other side in his current case is Maggie Lizer (Julia Louis-Dreyfus). Michael goes to catch up with Maggie and learns she's 8.5 months pregnant and that they haven't seen each other in 8.5 months; she tells Michael that the child is not his, but he isn't convinced.

On his date with Sally, Michael tells her that he thinks Maggie's child might be his, and she breaks up with Michael because she thinks that he is always looking for things to come between them. Gob tells Michael that he would make Maggie pee in a cup right in front of him to make sure that she isn't lying about being pregnant, so Lindsay and Tobias decide to break into Maggie's house and collect the specimen. George Sr. (Tambor) summons Michael to the attic with his wolf howl to try to convince him to get Buster out of going to war. Michael goes to Maggie's, while Lindsay and Tobias sneak in and head to the bathroom to get a urine sample. Dressed as Oscar, George Sr. visits Buster to convince him that he should hide to avoid going to war, and Buster tells him that he's a good uncle, to which George replies, "I'm not your uncle, I'm your father." Buster confronts Lucille, who unwittingly confesses that Buster's true father is Oscar. Buster angrily storms off, and Lucille snaps out of her denial.

Michael brings Maggie to a bar to talk about his potential fatherhood while Lindsay and Tobias search the house for proof that Maggie is faking her pregnancy. Maggie tells Michael that the baby is his, but at her home, Lindsay and Tobias discover a box with a pregnant suit in it and leave a message on Michael's phone confirming that the pregnancy is a scam. Ann introduces Lucille to the power of prayer. Michael listens to Lindsay's message about the pregnancy suit, calls Maggie a liar, and dumps her. She shows him her very real pregnant stomach, while Lindsay and Tobias burst in with the urine from the sample they had collected, it being positive.

=== On the next Arrested Development... ===
Barry tells Michael that Maggie's fat suit was part of her legal case and that she is suing him for paternity. Lucille prays, begging God to take anything from the family to keep Buster from going to war. Buster is on his way to the army when he decides to finally go swimming in the ocean, where a loose seal bites off his hand.

== Production ==
"Out on a Limb" was directed by Danny Leiner, and written by supervising producer Chuck Martin and co-executive producer Jim Vallely. It was Leiner's first and only directing credit, Martin's sixth writing credit and Vallely's eighth writing credit. It was the eleventh episode of the season to be filmed.

Buster sits in front of a sign reading "Army Surplus Official Supply", obscuring it so it reads "Arm Off"; this was an intentional piece of foreshadowing, according to series creator Mitchell Hurwitz.

Tony Hale cited the episode as an example of how the series constantly surprised him, recalling that the writers' decision for Buster to lose his hand was one such shock. Buster losing his hand was conceived early into development of season two. Series creator Mitchell Hurwitz encouraged the writers to experiment more with the directions the series would go in, and, as a joking example in an email, wrote about Buster losing his hand to a seal attack. Eventually, the idea was transformed into an actual storyline. The show had foreshadowed the incident multiple times throughout the second season, including just before it happened, when Buster sits on a bench that reads "Army Surplus Official Supply", though his position obscures the words so it appears to say "Arm Off".

The "Arm Off" line was added as a way to add a subtle gag for the viewer to find, something that wouldn't be possible with a live studio audience, as stated by Hurwitz. He later admitted he wished he had included even more foreshadowing, noting that he regretted not taking greater advantage of the hand-shaped chair. To make up for it, he emphasized Buster’s nervous habit of back-rubbing. When the idea was first pitched, Hale disliked it because he enjoyed performing with both hands, but he eventually embraced it after learning Buster would be fitted with a hook prosthetic.

"Out on a Limb" was first released on home video in the United States on October 11, 2005, in the Complete Second Season DVD box set.

== Themes ==
Buster's hand being bitten off is something that occurs because of his surroundings; in later episodes, it is revealed Gob is responsible for the seal being in that one specific spot in the ocean. As described by author William Irwin, this humorously shows how much adding a backstory to an event can affect our perception of it, as the hand loss would not be as interesting to the viewer if not for Gob's subsequently revealed involvement.

== Reception ==
=== Viewers ===
In the United States, the episode was watched by 6.34 million viewers on its original broadcast, an increase of almost 1 million viewers from the previous episode, "Ready, Aim, Marry Me!"

=== Critical reception ===
The A.V. Club writer Noel Murray praised the episode and it's follow-up, "Hand to God", saying "Mitchell Hurwitz already knows how to handle long-form storytelling". In 2019, Brian Tallerico from Vulture ranked the episode 31st out of the whole series, saying it "Lindsay and Tobias rekindling their passion while they try to steal a stranger’s pee is hysterical, but the Maggie stuff just isn’t quite as funny as season one." Tony Hale listed Dr. Fishman's "all-right handed" line as his favorite joke in the entire series, although he admitted he did not get the pun until a fan pointed it out to him at a convention.
