= Spring Breakout =

- Arrested Development episode
- Episode no.: Season 2 Episode 17
- Directed by: Anthony Russo
- Written by: Barbie Adler; Abraham Higginbotham
- Cinematography by: Greg Harrington
- Editing by: Richard Candib
- Production code: 2AJD16
- Original air date: April 10, 2005
- Running time: 22 minutes

Guest appearances
- Zach Braff as Phillip Litt; Dick Van Patten as Cal Cullen; Jeff Garlin as Mort Meyers; Judy Greer as Kitty Sanchez

Episode chronology
← Previous "Meat the Veals"	Next → "Righteous Brothers"
- Arrested Development season 2

"Spring Breakout" is the seventeenth episode of the second season of the American television satirical sitcom Arrested Development. It is the 39th overall episode of the series, and was written by supervising producer Barbie Adler and executive story editor Abraham Higginbotham, and directed by Anthony Russo. It originally aired on Fox on April 10, 2005.

The series, narrated by Ron Howard, follows the Bluths, a formerly wealthy, dysfunctional family, who made their money from property development. The Bluth family consists of Michael, his twin sister Lindsay, his older brother Gob, his younger brother Buster, their mother Lucille and father George Sr., as well as Michael's son George Michael, and Lindsay and her husband Tobias' daughter Maeby. In the episode, Michael checks Lucille into rehab, but she challenges Kitty to a drinking contest with George Sr. as the prize.

== Plot ==
Michael (Jason Bateman) is leading the company's meeting with landowner Cal Cullen (Dick Van Patten) when Lucille (Jessica Walter) walks in drunk, having taken Buster's (Tony Hale) pain medication for a hangover and then misreading an alcohol warning as an alcohol suggestion. Cullen refuses to do business with the Bluths, so Michael suggests to Lindsay (Portia de Rossi) that they hold an intervention for Lucille, but Gob suggests rehab instead. Tobias (David Cross) shows up to complain about being panned for his performance as George Sr in Scandalmakers, while at the movie studio, Maeby (Alia Shawkat) is ordered to find out how teenagers actually talk. Knowing that Lucille won't go to rehab willingly, Michael offers her a trip to a spa, but upon arriving, Lucille realizes that she is actually at a rehab facility and tries to flee, only to be subdued by the guards. Kitty Sanchez (Judy Greer) finds George Sr. (Jeffrey Tambor) in the attic and kidnaps him.

Kitty takes George Sr. to a motel and screams that he owes her a child, while Buster, unable to sleep, begins to drink from a large box of wine, mistaking it for a giant juicebox. Michael meets with Cal Cullen again and wins him over, but Kitty interrupts, threatening to bring the company down unless Lucille meets her in a bar. Gob uses Oscar (Tambor) to distract the guards so that they can abduct Lucille. Kitty offers to trade her evidence for a sperm sample from George Sr., and Lucille puts it up to a drinking contest. Gob finds a cooler in the banana stand freezer that looks exactly like the evidence cooler, and he and Michael plan to switch it. Maeby is frustrated by the immaturity of the teenagers at the banana stand, while Phillip Litt (Zach Braff), creator of Girls With Low Self-Esteem, accuses Lindsay of being ashamed of her body, so Tobias pulls down Litt's pants, exposing him as a never nude.

Gob, excited at the thought of spring break, performs a wolf call in the hotel hallway, which inadvertently sets off a response by George Sr., allowing them to find his room. Gob tries to vomit up the handcuff key, while Michael forges the signature of Saddam Hussein on the decoy cooler, promising to turn it in to the police. George Sr. tells Michael to turn it in, saying that the evidence exonerates him. George Michael finds Maeby talking to a vapid boy, saying that she is like a "delicate flower" and that he doesn't "want her to be plucked by someone who doesn't even care that [she is] blossoming." Maeby says that this is just what she wanted to hear (as dialogue for her movie) and kisses George Michael on the cheek. Unbeknownst to her, this reignites George Michael's feelings for her and he calls up Ann (Mae Whitman), intending to dump her. Lucille wins the drinking contest despite drinking extra between rounds, and Gob regains his self-confidence after the successful rescue of George Sr., but then falls into the pool while holding the cooler, destroying the exonerating evidence.

=== On the next Arrested Development... ===
When Michael gets home, he finds out from Lucille that the decoy cooler that they left in Kitty's motel room contained a sperm sample from George Sr.

== Production ==
"Spring Breakout" was directed by Anthony Russo, and written by supervising producer Barbie Adler and executive story editor Abraham Higginbotham. It was Russo's fifth and final directing credit, Alder's seventh and final writing credit and Higginbotham's fifth and final writing credit. It was the fifteenth episode of the season to be filmed. According to Jessica Walter, the chicken dance scene between Gob, Lucille, and George Sr. was not scripted, and there were no directions on how to do the dance. They had to each come up with their own dance, and Walter's first instinct was to flap her arms around, taking note that Lucille might possibly be drunk in the episode while coming up with the dance; adding onto the drunk performance, she added Lucille's "coddle doodle doo" line. To prepare for the scene, Walter practiced her dance in front of her dressing room mirror.

== Reception ==
=== Viewers ===
In the United States, the episode was watched by 5.19 million viewers on its original broadcast.

=== Critical reception ===
The A.V. Club writer Noel Murray commented how the episode "continues the meta moves of "Sword Of Destiny"". Brian Tallerico from Vulture ranked the episode 41st out of the whole series, calling it "a funny episode, but a lot of the jokes feel like echoes of funnier ones from a classic season-one installment."
