= Righteous Brothers (Arrested Development) =

- Arrested Development episode
- George Sr. stops a fight between his sons Michael Bluth and Gob.
- Episode no.: Season 2 Episode 18
- Directed by: Chuck Martin
- Written by: Mitchell Hurwitz; Jim Vallely
- Cinematography by: Greg Harrington
- Editing by: Richard Candib
- Production code: 2AJD18
- Original air date: April 17, 2005
- Running time: 22 minutes

Guest appearances
- Henry Winkler as Barry Zuckerkorn; Jeff Garlin as Mort Meyers; Dick Van Patten as Cal Cullen; Mae Whitman as Ann Veal; John Michael Higgins as Wayne Jarvis; Judy Greer as Kitty

Episode chronology
← Previous "Spring Breakout"	Next → "The Cabin Show"
- Arrested Development season 2

"Righteous Brothers" (also titled "The Righteous Brothers" on the season 2 DVD) is the eighteenth and final episode of the second season of the American television satirical sitcom Arrested Development. It is the 40th overall episode of the series, and was written by series creator Mitchell Hurwitz and co-executive producer Jim Vallely, and directed by Chuck Martin. It originally aired on Fox on April 17, 2005.

The series, narrated by Ron Howard, follows the Bluths, a formerly wealthy, dysfunctional family, who made their money from property development. The Bluth family consists of Michael, his twin sister Lindsay, his older brother Gob, his younger brother Buster, their mother Lucille and father George Sr., as well as Michael's son George Michael, and Lindsay and her husband Tobias' daughter Maeby. In the episode, the model home collapses and Tobias and Kitty head to Las Vegas together.

An extended version of the episode was released as a special feature on the DVD home release. The episode received mostly positive reviews from critics. At the 57th Primetime Emmy Awards, Hurwitz and Vallely received the Outstanding Writing for a Comedy Series award for this episode.

== Plot ==
Having been told that the house is sinking and that a city inspector is on the way, Michael (Jason Bateman) tells George Sr. (Jeffrey Tambor) that he needs to move out of the attic. Having made a music CD with his puppet Franklin, Gob (Will Arnett) asks Michael if he heard it, and Michael assures Gob that he did. Realizing that George Sr. doesn't want to leave the attic, Gob knocks him out with ether and drives him in the stair car to the police station to turn him in. Seeing that the Franklin CD he made for Michael hasn't been opened, Gob makes it seem as if Michael drove George Sr. to the station.

After signing an affidavit stating that he doesn't know where his father is, Michael is arrested after a security camera photo shows Gob holding a picture of Michael on his face, making it seem as if Michael had met with his father earlier in the day. Meanwhile, George Michael (Michael Cera) and Ann (Mae Whitman) protest the American remake of the film Les Cousins Dangereux, in which two cousins fall in love. Maeby (Alia Shawkat), who created the remake, is told by producers to cut down the movie into a mere 52 minutes. At home, George Michael and Maeby share a kiss on the living room couch, but after she jokingly says that they "didn't get swallowed up into hell," the house fully sinks.

Gob arrives to retrieve his father who he put underground the house, only to realize George Sr. had escaped earlier in the day. Earlier, George Sr., having escaped, knocked out his brother Oscar (Tambor), shaved his head, and placed him in the police station's bathroom. He then witnessed Gob arriving outside the police station and starting a fight with Michael. George Sr., stopping the fight, stated that he was turning himself in, only to lead the cops into the bathroom where Oscar was located, which resulted in Oscar being arrested.

=== On the next Arrested Development... ===
Having burnt his hands on the family Cornballer, which erased his fingerprints, Oscar has trouble explaining to the cops who he really is. Having broken up with Lindsay (Portia de Rossi), Tobias (David Cross) decides to quit his job at the Bluth Company and move to Las Vegas with his new girlfriend Kitty (Judy Greer). Having arrived at Las Vegas, Tobias is told that his dream job has been filled in by a mysterious man, who happens to be George Sr.

== Production ==
"Righteous Brothers" was directed by Chuck Martin, and written by series creator Mitchell Hurwitz and co-executive producer Jim Vallely. It was Martin's first and only directing credit, Hurwtitz's 14th writing credit and Vallely's tenth writing credit. It was the eighteenth and final episode of the season to be filmed.

The idea for the plot revolving around Gob and Franklin's $5000 CD was partially inspired off of a story from writer Brad Copeland; Copeland was given a CD from someone, and he felt he hadn't thanked them enough. This eventually morphed into a story concept of Michael not thanking Gob enough for a CD he had given to him, leading to them making it worth an exaggerated $5000.

== Reception ==
In the United States, the episode was watched by 5.99 million viewers on its original broadcast.

=== Critical reception ===
The A.V. Club writer Noel Murray wrote that the season finale didn't feel much like a finale, saying that "there's a fumbling-for-an-ending aspect to "Righteous Brothers" that keeps it from being one of the classic Arrested Developments. Chalk it up to the reduced episode order, which makes this finale feel like a big finish and just an ordinary episode, all at once." In 2019, Brian Tallerico, writing for Vulture, ranked the episode 42nd out of the whole series.

=== Accolades ===
"Righteous Brothers" was honored at the 57th Primetime Emmy Awards. Mitchell Hurwitz and Jim Vallely received the Outstanding Writing for a Comedy Series award for writing the episode, and Jeffrey Tambor was nominated for the Outstanding Supporting Actor in a Comedy Series award for his supporting role as George Sr.
