= Ready, Aim, Marry Me! =

- Arrested Development episode
- Episode no.: Season 2 Episode 10
- Directed by: Paul Feig
- Written by: Jim Vallely; Mitchell Hurwitz
- Cinematography by: Greg Harrington
- Editing by: Richard Candib
- Production code: 2AJD10
- Original air date: February 13, 2005
- Running time: 22 minutes

Guest appearances
- Liza Minnelli as Lucille Austero; Ed Begley Jr. as Stan Sitwell; Martin Short as Uncle Jack; Troy Brenna as Dragon (uncredited)

Episode chronology
| ← Previous "Burning Love" | Next → "Out on a Limb" |
- Arrested Development season 2

"Ready, Aim, Marry Me!" is the tenth episode of the second season of the American television satirical sitcom Arrested Development. It is the 32nd overall episode of the series, and was written by co-executive producer Jim Vallely and series creator Mitchell Hurwitz, and directed by Paul Feig. It originally aired on Fox on February 13, 2005.

The series, narrated by Ron Howard, follows the Bluths, a formerly wealthy, dysfunctional family, who made their money from property development. The Bluth family consists of Michael, his twin sister Lindsay, his older brother Gob, his younger brother Buster, their mother Lucille and father George Sr., as well as Michael's son George Michael, and Lindsay and her husband Tobias' daughter Maeby. In the episode, thinking Lucille 2 (the majority shareholder) and Stan Sitwell are plotting against the Bluth company, Michael sets up Lindsay to go on a romantic get-away with her fake Uncle Jack on the condition that Jack will bail out the company again. Gob and Buster follow Lucille 2 and Stan on their date.

== Plot ==
Lucille (Jessica Walter) tells Michael (Jason Bateman) that she thinks Lucille Austero (Liza Minnelli) is making a power play by buying up shares of the company, and Michael gives Tobias (David Cross) the basket he received when he bid for Sally Sitwell (Christine Taylor) for him to give to Lindsay (Portia de Rossi). Gob (Will Arnett) tells Michael that he thinks Lucille 2 and Stan Sitwell (Ed Begley Jr.) are planning to take over the company. Michael tells George Sr. (Jeffrey Tambor) of his fears of Lucille 2, and George Sr. realizes that the company needs money and suggests bringing in "Uncle" Jack Dorso (Martin Short). George Sr. tells Michael that Jack was a friend of his father and he always wants something in return for a favor.

The family gathers at Lucille's to solicit Uncle Jack, who arrives in the arms of his muscular assistant, Dragon (Troy Brenna). Michael makes his request to Jack, who makes it clear that if Michael sets Jack up with Lindsay, he will bail out the company. Michael, knowing that Lindsay is attracted to Dragon, sets up a romantic weekend for Jack and Lindsay, who thinks the romantic weekend is with Dragon. Buster (Tony Hale) decides to pursue Lucille 2 once more, and he and Gob spy on Lucille and Sitwell. When Maeby (Alia Shawkat) tells Michael that Tobias has left with his romantic gift basket, he heads for the hotel to stop him. Seeing Jack, Dragon, and Lindsay arriving, Michael joins Tobias on the romantic horse ride.

Michael tries to tell Tobias that Lindsay won't be showing up, but Gob and Buster arrive, announcing that they saw Lindsay with Jack and Dragon. The group then ambushes Lucille 2 and Sitwell. Realizing that Lucille 2 and Stan are entangled romantically instead of intending to sell the company, Michael tries to stop Lindsay from going through with Jack. Buster, upset that Gob was actually sleeping with Lucille 2, attacks him. Lucille 2, upset at the family's tricks, decides that she will now sell her shares, and Tobias, having discovered Lindsay with Jack and Dragon, fights Jack for Lindsay's love. Tobias loses when Dragon hurls Jack at him, sending both of them to the floor. Michael carries Jack home, for which Jack agrees to buy the controlling shares of the Bluth Company.

=== On the next Arrested Development... ===
Uncle Jack buys the Bluth Company and makes Lindsay president, and Tobias listens to a tape recording of his own words from Michael's suggestion.

== Production ==
"Ready, Aim, Marry Me!" was directed by Paul Feig, and written by co-executive producer Jim Vallely and series creator Mitchell Hurwitz. It was Feig's fifth directing credit, Vallely's seventh writing credit and Hurwitzs' eleventh writing credit. It was the tenth episode of the season to be filmed.

== Reception ==
=== Viewers ===
In the United States, the episode was watched by 5.61 million viewers on its original broadcast, a decrease of over 1 million viewers from the previous episode, "Burning Love".

=== Critical reception ===
The A.V. Club writer Noel Murray commented on the episode as being "a lot better than its reputation." In 2019, Brian Tallerico from Vulture ranked the episode 21st out of the whole series, saying it "ends in one of the most ridiculous sequences in the show’s history, but it’s an inspired insanity."
