= Good Grief (Arrested Development) =

- Arrested Development episode
- George Michael walks while looking down with his hands to his side as a beagle sleeps on a red doghouse—both references to the Peanuts franchise.
- Episode no.: Season 2 Episode 4
- Directed by: Jeff Melman
- Written by: John Levenstein
- Cinematography by: Greg Harrington
- Editing by: Richard Candib
- Production code: 2AJD04
- Original air date: December 5, 2004
- Running time: 22 minutes

Guest appearances
- Henry Winkler as Barry Zuckerkorn; Malik Yoba as Ice; Mae Whitman as Ann Veal

Episode chronology
← Previous "¡Amigos!"	Next → "Sad Sack"
- Arrested Development season 2

"Good Grief" is the fourth episode of the second season of the American television satirical sitcom Arrested Development. Written by consulting producer John Levenstein and directed by Jeff Melman, it first aired on Fox on December 5, 2004.

The series, narrated by Ron Howard, follows the Bluths, a formerly wealthy, dysfunctional family, who made their money from property development. The Bluth family consists of Michael, his twin sister Lindsay, his older brother Gob, his younger brother Buster, their mother Lucille and father George Sr., as well as Michael's son George Michael, and Lindsay and her husband Tobias' daughter Maeby. In the episode, after Ice reveals that George Sr. has been executed in Mexico, the family holds a wake. Gob attempts an illusion in which he is buried in place of his father's body, which upsets Buster, who was told that it was a birthday party. George Michael discovers George Sr. alive in an underground bunker and hides him in the attic.

At the time of, and since, airing, the episode received critical acclaim, with it often being labeled as the greatest episode of Arrested Development and one of the greatest television episodes of all time. Series creator Mitchell Hurwitz called it his third favorite episode of the series, and Rolling Stone ranked the episode as the 29th best television episode of all time in 2024.

== Plot ==
Ice, the bounty hunter that Michael hired, discovers that George Sr. has supposedly died in Mexico, while Ann breaks up with George Michael. Maeby seeks advice from Barry Zuckerkorn on divorcing her parents. The family discusses a wake for George Sr., and Gob plans to turn the event into an illusion.

Buster is not told the truth about his father's death out of fear of him overreacting. George Michael finds George Sr., who had faked his death and came back to win Lucille back from his brother Oscar, alive and hiding in a spider hole, so George Michael hides him in the attic of the model home. The wake begins, with George Sr. watching through a vent and sending George Michael to bring him hors d'oeuvres. Michael intercepts his son, reuniting him with Ann and telling him that he wants them to be happy and honest with each other.

Buster arrives, and Lucille asks Gob to get him out of the house before he realizes it is a wake. Outside, Gob begins his illusion, but gets buried alive when Buster realizes that the event is his father's wake. Gob is put on the cover of Poof, a magazine for magicians. Michael finds his father in the attic and tells everyone else, but when they arrive at the attic, George Sr. has apparently fled. When they leave, George Sr. emerges from a hiding spot, and Michael keeps his secret.

== Production ==
"Good Grief" was directed by Jeff Melman and written by consulting producer John Levenstein. It was Levenstein's sixth and final writing credit for Arrested Development, and was the fourth episode of the season to be filmed.

Arrested Development was given permission by the estate of Charles M. Schulz to make references to Peanuts in the episode.

The scene of Buster throwing a vacuum towards a bus proved difficult to shoot, and required six takes before it was finished. Jason Tinero, who portrayed young Buster, later said that, during his time on the show, the scene was his favorite, but noted how tedious it was to get it right. The bus moved at a regular pace, and Tinero was required to throw the vacuum while it was in motion; however, his aim was not accurate enough, and the bus had to be slowed down with each new take so he could move closer and have a more precise throw.

Arrested Development had previously made several references to the Peanuts franchise—particularly by using character names such as Linus to refer to body parts—and so they were granted permission to do the episode by the estate of Charles M. Schulz. Director Suzanne Makkos revealed in an interview with The Hollywood Reporter that she stole the copy of Poof Magazine used on set after filming commenced. While filming the scene of George Sr. hiding from the family under the sand, Jeffrey Tambor recalled "giggling" at the thought of it, wondering "Who gets a job like this?"

"Good Grief" was first released on home video in the United States on October 11, 2005, in the Complete Second Season DVD box set. The set includes audio commentary for the episode from series creator Mitchell Hurwitz, Will Arnett, Michael Cera, David Cross, Tony Hale, Alia Shawkat, and Jessica Walter.

== Reception ==
=== Viewers ===
In the United States, the episode was watched by 6.66 million viewers on its original broadcast.

=== Contemporary reviews ===
The episode was labeled as one of the best of the 2004 season by Variety's Neal Justin, who listed the multiple Peanuts references and the ironic use of them as highlights. In 2005, The Free Lance-Star's Amy Amatangelo wrote in her assessment of the series that "Good Grief" was her "all time" favorite episode, particularly for the gag of Gob quickly removing his stripper pants.

=== Retrospective assessments ===
"Good Grief" is considered to be one of Arrested Development's best installments, often being labeled as the single greatest episode of the series. The A.V. Club writer Noel Murray praised the episode, calling it a "stunningly well-constructed piece of farce". In 2019, Brian Tallerico from Vulture ranked the episode as the 20th best of the whole series. In 2015, Megan Walsh from Screen Rant ranked the episode as one of the top ten best of the series. Series creator Mitchell Hurwitz ranked "Good Grief" as his third favorite episode of the show. In 2024, Alan Sepinwall from Rolling Stone ranked the episode as the 29th best television episode of all time, calling it "a standout from the series’ initial three-year run".

=== Accolades ===
Richard Candib was nominated for Outstanding Single-Camera Picture Editing for a Comedy Series at the 57th Primetime Emmy Awards for "Good Grief".
