= The Immaculate Election =

- Arrested Development episode
- Episode no.: Season 2 Episode 14
- Directed by: Anthony Russo
- Written by: Barbie Adler; Abraham Higginbotham
- Cinematography by: Greg Harrington
- Editing by: Richard Candib
- Production code: 2AJD14
- Original air date: March 20, 2005
- Running time: 22 minutes

Guest appearances
- Mae Whitman as Ann Veal; Justin Grant Wade as Steve Holt; Rob Corddry as Moses Taylor; B.W. Gonzalez as Lupe

Episode chronology
| ← Previous "Motherboy XXX" | Next → "Sword of Destiny" |
- Arrested Development season 2

"The Immaculate Election" is the fourteenth episode of the second season of the American television satirical sitcom Arrested Development. It is the 36th overall episode of the series, and was written by supervising producer Barbie Adler and executive story editor Abraham Higginbotham, and directed by Anthony Russo. It originally aired on Fox on March 20, 2005.

The series, narrated by Ron Howard, follows the Bluths, a formerly wealthy, dysfunctional family, who made their money from property development. The Bluth family consists of Michael, his twin sister Lindsay, his older brother Gob, his younger brother Buster, their mother Lucille and father George Sr., as well as Michael's son George Michael, and Lindsay and her husband Tobias' daughter Maeby. In the episode, George Michael runs a doomed campaign for class president against Steve Holt. Lindsay kicks Tobias out, but he returns as their singing British housekeeper, Mrs. Featherbottom.

== Plot ==
Lindsay (Portia de Rossi) has kicked Tobias (David Cross) out of the house, and with nowhere to go, he takes up residence in the apartment of Detective Frank Wrench on the set of Wrench. Ann (Mae Whitman) suggests that George Michael (Michael Cera) run for student body president, offering to run his campaign and create a campaign video. At the office, Michael (Jason Bateman) fires Gob (Will Arnett) because he is frustrated that Gob didn't show up to give his vote in support of his project. Maeby (Alia Shawkat) uses the office copier to make campaign posters for Steve Holt (Justin Grant Wade), and tells Michael that George Michael isn't as popular as imagined, so Michael heads to the school to prevent his son from signing up for the presidential race.

Lucille (Jessica Walter) finds Buster (Tony Hale) in bed with Lupe (B.W. Gonzalez) and fires her. Michael arrives at the school to talk his son out of running for office, but George Michael has already collected the required signatures and is excited to run. Gob arrives at Lucille's to complain that Michael has fired him. Lindsay hires a maid, Mrs Featherbottom, who is actually Tobias dressed like Mrs. Doubtfire; Tobias had borrowed the costume from the studio in an attempt to see his daughter and prove to his wife that he has what it take to become an actor. Michael and Lindsay both immediately recognize Tobias in his costume, but neither say anything to him, with Michael more concerned that his son will be crushed by Steve Holt in the school election.

Michael goes to Gob to help with George Michael, and Gob agrees to help on the condition that Michael rehire him. Michael, Gob, Ann, and George Michael meet to discuss the campaign, and Gob asks for every awful rumor about Steve Holt, causing Ann to walk away in disgust. Steve Holt plays his campaign video, which has been produced by his new campaign manager, Ann. In the Christian-themed video, Steve says that although he didn't know his father, he felt like he had a new father, Jesus. George Michael's video, produced by Gob, is an offensive hit piece mocking the fact that Steve Holt doesn't know his own father. Steve Holt drops out of the race to find his father, and an Indian kid wins with 97% of the vote. George Michael finishes last, but does win back Ann.

=== On the next Arrested Development... ===
Lucille hires Mrs Featherbottom for her apartment, and Steve Holt tracks down his father, who is Gob.

== Production ==
"The Immaculate Election" was directed by Anthony Russo, and written by supervising producer Barbie Adler and executive story editor Abraham Higginbotham. It was Russo's fourth directing credit, Alder's fifth writing credit and Higginbotham's fourth writing credit. It was the fourteenth episode of the season to be filmed.

== Reception ==
=== Viewers ===
In the United States, the episode was watched by 5.73 million viewers on its original broadcast.

=== Critical reception ===
The A.V. Club writer Noel Murray praised the episode, saying ""The Immaculate Election", while not as brilliantly batty as "Motherboy XXX," is just about as funny." In 2019, Brian Tallerico from Vulture ranked the episode 49th out of the whole series, calling it "One of the weaker episodes of season two feels like a something of a letdown after the genius of the Motherboy pageant and the initial arc of Buster losing his hand."
