= Hand to God =

Hand to God may refer to:

- "Hand to God" (Arrested Development), the 12th episode of the second season of Arrested Development
- Hand to God (play), a 2011 play written by Robert Askins
