= Meat the Veals =

- Arrested Development episode
- Episode no.: Season 2 Episode 16
- Directed by: Joe Russo
- Written by: Barbie Adler; Richard Rosenstock
- Cinematography by: Greg Harrington
- Editing by: Robert Bramwell; Richard Candib
- Production code: 2AJD15
- Original air date: April 3, 2005
- Running time: 22 minutes

Guest appearances
- Ione Skye as Mrs. Veal; Alan Tudyk as Pastor Veal; Mae Whitman as Ann Veal

Episode chronology
← Previous "Sword of Destiny"	Next → "Spring Breakout"
- Arrested Development season 2

"Meat the Veals" is the sixteenth episode of the second season of the American television satirical sitcom Arrested Development. It is the 38th overall episode of the series, and was written by supervising producer Barbie Adler and co-executive producer Richard Rosenstock, and directed by Joe Russo. It originally aired on Fox on April 3, 2005.

The series, narrated by Ron Howard, follows the Bluths, a formerly wealthy, dysfunctional family, who made their money from property development. The Bluth family consists of Michael, his twin sister Lindsay, his older brother Gob, his younger brother Buster, their mother Lucille and father George Sr., as well as Michael's son George Michael, and Lindsay and her husband Tobias' daughter Maeby. In the episode, Michael introduces the Bluths to Ann's conservative parents, hoping to turn them against George Michael and Ann's pre-engagement. Oscar throws Lucille an anniversary party.

== Plot ==
Oscar (Jeffrey Tambor) wants to throw Lucille (Jessica Walter) a party to celebrate her wedding anniversary; he had gotten the idea from Buster (Tony Hale), who said that it would show how Oscar has been there for Lucille while George Sr. (Tambor) has been a fugitive. Upon hearing of the party, George Sr. concocts a plan to win back Lucille by renewing his vows and enlists Gob (Will Arnett) to abduct her and take her to Church of the Good Shepherd. Tobias (David Cross) continues to disguise himself as Mrs. Featherbottom, unaware that everyone knows that it is him. The others are taking advantage of this, with Maeby (Alia Shawkat) getting her ironing done and Lucille using him for catering.

George Michael (Michael Cera) has decided to ask Ann (Mae Whitman) if she will get pre-engaged to him, but Michael (Jason Bateman) is against the idea and meets with Ann's parents, thinking that they will feel the same way. It turns out that they support the pre-engagement, so Michael invites the Veals to an engagement party to see how dysfunctional the Bluths are. However, at the party, the family is surprisingly normal, to Michael's annoyance. He convinces George Michael not to go through with the pre-engagement, but after George Michael sees Ann's mother (Ione Skye) kissing Michael on the balcony, he goes ahead with it.

George Sr. and Gob, using Gob's black puppet Franklin, abduct Lucille and take her to the church in which Ann's father (Alan Tudyk), a pastor, is presiding. The whole family arrives at the church, and two fights ensue — one between Oscar and George Sr. over Lucille, and the other between Michael and Pastor Veal over Mrs. Veal. When the police arrive, George Sr. escapes wearing Tobias's Mrs. Featherbottom wig. George Michael talks Ann out of marrying him, but Ann tries to convince George Michael to have sex.

=== On the next Arrested Development... ===
Buster's hook hand gets confiscated by the police after a drug dog pounces on him, resulting in Buster using Franklin the puppet as a temporary substitute, despite Lucille's objections.

== Production ==
"Meat the Veals" was directed by Joe Russo, and written by supervising producer Barbie Adler and co-executive producer Richard Rosenstock. It was Russo's tenth and final directing credit, Adler's sixth writing credit and Rosenstock's seventh writing credit. It was the fifteenth episode of the season to be filmed. Series creator Mitchell Hurwitz had long wanted to do a homage to Soap—a series he himself used to work on—through the use of ventriloquism. He eventually settled on the idea of giving Gob a black puppet he could use to offend others, who was to be named Franklin after the Peanuts character of the same name.

=== Future of Franklin ===
In an interview regarding the fourth season, Fox's property master Greg Finnin revealed that the puppet of Franklin was left "somewhere in a box" owned by the FX company Creature Effects, Inc. Finnin expressed that, whilst Franklin was not going to return in season four, he was interested in bringing him back if the series was ever revived again.

== Reception ==
=== Viewers ===
In the United States, the episode was watched by 5.33 million viewers on its original broadcast.

=== Critical reception ===
The A.V. Club writer Noel Murray called the episode "another late-season-two Arrested Development episode that spins out of control," but then says "who the hell cares?" Brian Tallerico from Vulture ranked the episode 26th out of the whole series.
