= The One Where They Build a House =

- Arrested Development episode
- Multiple on-lookers stare at the newly constructed house.
- Episode no.: Season 2 Episode 2
- Directed by: Patty Jenkins
- Written by: Mitchell Hurwitz; Jim Vallely
- Cinematography by: Greg Harrington
- Editing by: Richard Candib
- Production code: 2AJD02
- Original air date: November 14, 2004
- Running time: 22 minutes

Guest appearances
- Mo Collins as Starla; Mae Whitman as Ann Veal; Judy Greer as Kitty Sanchez; John Beard as himself; Thomas Jane as himself

Episode chronology
← Previous "The One Where Michael Leaves"	Next → "¡Amigos!"
- Arrested Development season 2

"The One Where They Build a House" is the second episode of the second season of the American television satirical sitcom Arrested Development. It is the 24th overall episode of the series, and was written by series creator Mitchell Hurwitz and co-executive producer Jim Vallely, and directed by Patty Jenkins. It originally aired on Fox on November 14, 2004.

The series, narrated by Ron Howard, follows the Bluths, a formerly wealthy, dysfunctional family, who made their money from property development. The Bluth family consists of Michael, his twin sister Lindsay, his older brother Gob, his younger brother Buster, their mother Lucille and father George Sr., as well as Michael's son George Michael, and Lindsay and her husband Tobias' daughter Maeby. In the episode, Gob promises a model house for a new development in only 2 weeks, so everyone in the family helps to build a fake house that is empty on the inside. Lindsay buys a cream made of powdered diamonds.

== Plot ==
Michael plans to save the Bluth Company by beginning construction on a new model home and holding a ribbon-cutting ceremony. Gob, now president-in-name-only of the company, promises the board the house will be built in two weeks. Michael protests, and Gob suggests building a fake house, with nothing on the inside. Meanwhile, Buster tries to find a way out of being volunteered to the army by Lucille, while he suspects that she and Oscar are having an affair. Lucille tries repeatedly to end the relationship, but cannot resist Oscar's luxurious hair. Buster finally finds out about the affair, gets upset, and willingly goes off to war.

Lindsay and Tobias's newly open marriage becomes more competitive, and Lindsay makes a date with a homeless man, only to realize that he is actually an actor living on the street to research his role. After he rejects her, she and Tobias reconnect. As Gob cuts the ribbon on the hollow house at the ceremony, all four walls collapse. Gob angrily accuses Michael of setting him up, and the brothers get into a fight in front of the attending press, resulting in a lot of bad publicity for the company. Michael and Gob realize that their competitive attitudes stem from George Sr. always pitting them against each other.

Meanwhile, George Sr. hides out in Mexico with Kitty, who is driving him crazy. He asks Gob to wire him money, but the call ends when the police take him down for marijuana smuggling, thinking he is Oscar. George Sr. eventually convinces the Mexican police that he is not Oscar when they start to refer to his infamous appearance on the Bluth company's cornball fryer commercial. He thinks he is off the hook until all the Mexican officers angrily show him burns they got from attempting to use the fryer. He tries buying his way out of the predicament, but fails to contact Gob and Michael, who both have decided not to speak to him. He is unable to get the money for the bribe and is dragged away by the officers.

== Production ==
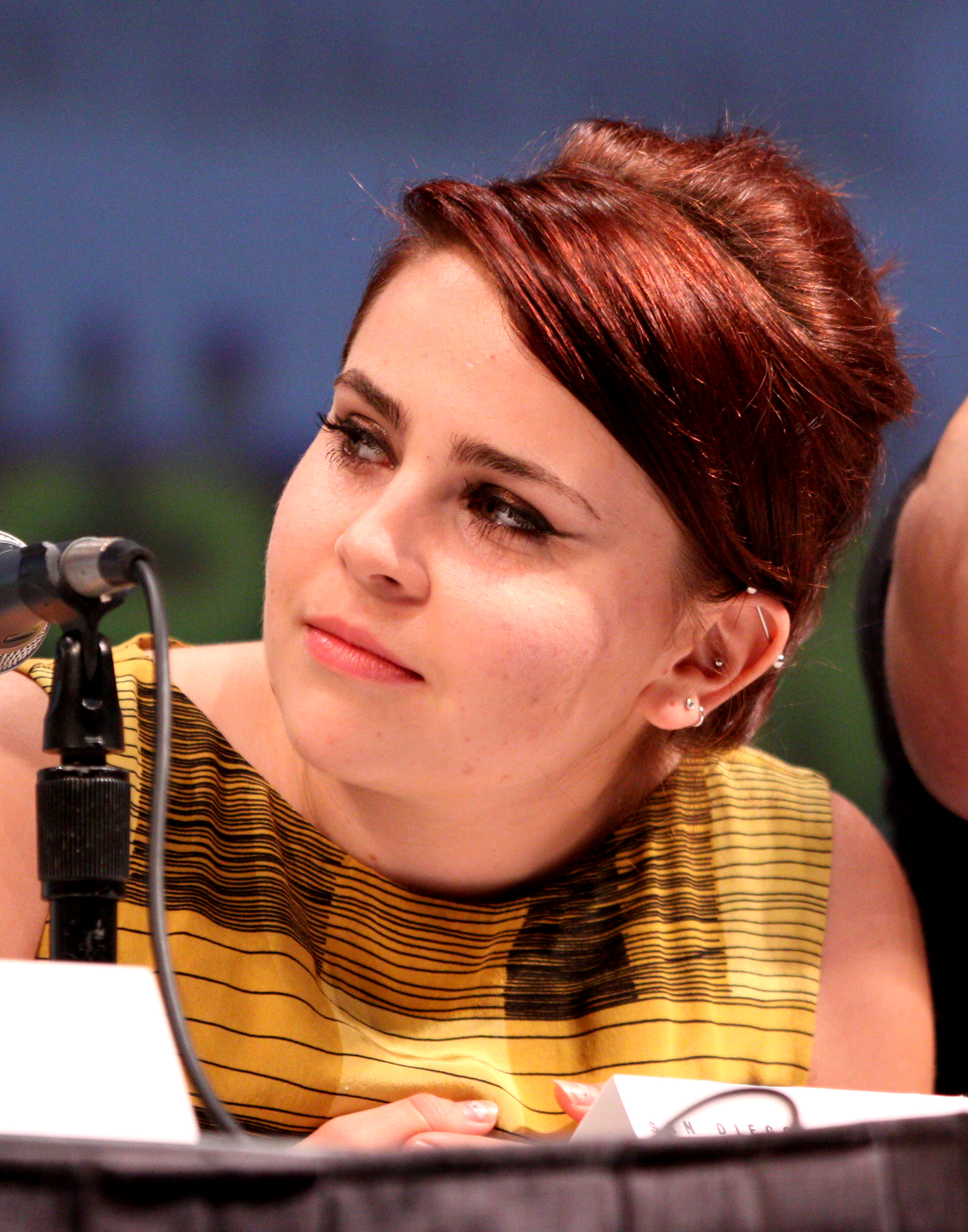
Mae Whitman makes her Arrested Development debut in "The One Where They Build a House".

"The One Where They Build a House" was directed by Patty Jenkins, and written by series creator Mitchell Hurwitz and co-executive producer Jim Vallely. It was Jenkins' first and only directing credit for Arrested Development, Hurwitz's tenth writing credit, and Vallely's sixth. It was the second episode of the season to be filmed.

When the news that she had directed the episode trended on social media over a decade later, Jenkins said that she "loved" working on the show. The episode's title format references the naming style of the sitcom Friends, which had finished airing six months prior. Mae Whitman makes her first appearance on the series as reoccurring character Ann Veal, who was previously played by Alessandra Torresani in "Let 'Em Eat Cake". Whitman was friends with Alia Shawkat, Maeby's actress, by that time, and had spent much time hanging out with her and Michael Cera on set; this friendship gave her the opportunity to audition, where producer and writer Jim Vallely found her performance to be humorous, and she was given the part. Tom Jane makes an uncredited guest appearance in the episode as a fictionalized version of himself.

Initially, there was a plan to replace Ann's actress with every subsequent appearance, but Whitman's performance was considered so "non-memorable" that she was allowed to keep the part. George Michael's line about eggs and mayonnaise was inspired by Hurwitz's disgust towards both foods; he claims that, to write the line, he put himself in Michael's position and tried to think of the worst possible thing he could see his son do.

== Reception ==
=== Viewers ===
In the United States, the episode was watched by 7.22 million viewers on its original broadcast.

=== Critical reception ===
The A.V. Club writer Noel Murray praised the episode, saying "this episode is big on bold slapstick moves." In 2019, Brian Tallerico from Vulture ranked the episode 24th out of the whole series, calling it a "very funny chapter".
