= Burning Love (Arrested Development) =

- Arrested Development episode
- Episode no.: Season 2 Episode 9
- Directed by: Paul Feig
- Written by: Chuck Martin; Lisa Parsons
- Cinematography by: Greg Harrington
- Editing by: Robert Bramwell
- Production code: 2AJD09
- Original air date: January 30, 2005
- Running time: 22 minutes

Guest appearances
- Liza Minnelli as Lucille Austero; Ed Begley Jr. as Stan Sitwell; Rob Corddry as Moses Taylor; Mae Whitman as Ann Veal; Christine Taylor as Sally Sitwell; Justin Grant Wade as Steve Holt; John Beard as himself

Episode chronology
← Previous "Queen for a Day"	Next → "Ready, Aim, Marry Me!"
- Arrested Development season 2

"Burning Love" is the ninth episode of the second season of the American television satirical sitcom Arrested Development. It is the 31st overall episode of the series, and was written by supervising producer Chuck Martin and Lisa Parsons, and directed by Paul Feig. It originally aired on Fox on January 30, 2005.

The series, narrated by Ron Howard, follows the Bluths, a formerly wealthy, dysfunctional family, who made their money from property development. The Bluth family consists of Michael, his twin sister Lindsay, his older brother Gob, his younger brother Buster, their mother Lucille and father George Sr., as well as Michael's son George Michael, and Lindsay and her husband Tobias' daughter Maeby. In the episode, Michael pursues childhood crush Sally Sitwell, Lindsay tries to entice a right-wing actor by wearing her mother's furs, and Gob and Lucille 2 continue their illicit relationship. George Michael stages a Christian music bonfire for his girlfriend Ann. George Sr. installs a hot-tub in his attic hideout.

== Plot ==
Michael (Jason Bateman) offers to cover for George Michael (Michael Cera) at the banana stand so he can buy Christian music for a bonfire he and Ann (Mae Whitman) are hosting. Lindsay (Portia de Rossi) asks Lucille (Jessica Walter) if she can borrow a fur for her date with the actor Moses Taylor (Rob Corddry). Tobias (David Cross) announces that he is no longer a standby understudy for the Blue Man Group after getting a cease and desist order for an ad he took out in a trade magazine promoting his own "Blue Man" show. At the banana stand, Michael sees Sally Sitwell (Christine Taylor), a girl that he had always been interested in but was awkward around because of his father's competition with her father Stan (Ed Begley Jr.). Gob (Will Arnett) interrupts their awkward exchange, and Michael asks Lucille for her country club membership because he wants to run into Sally, and she agrees on the condition that Michael bid on her at the charity auction.

Michael goes to the country club and runs into Sally and Stan, who invite him to lunch, where Michael notices Gob dining with Lucille Austero (Liza Minnelli), who Stan invites to join as well. After lunch, Michael tries to pick up the check, but his card is declined due to increased activity, because George Sr. (Jeffrey Tambor) used the card to buy a hot tub and a case of bag-and-boil dinners. Michael strikes up a deal with Gob: if Michael doesn't tell anyone about Gob and Lucille 2, Gob will siphon gas from Sally's car so that Michael can rescue her in the Corvette. Lindsay, dressed in a fur coat, meets Moses Taylor for their date in the park, but when he steps away, she breaks her heel, falls to the ground, and howls. Tobias fires the tranquilizer gun at her, thinking she is an escaped wolf. Moses returns to find Lindsay knocked out and leaves her on a bench to avoid a scandal.

Michael arrives to help Sally with her car which is on fire, but is rescued by the fire department before Sally sees his heroics. At the hospital, Michael tries to ask Sally out on a date but is cut off by a coughing fit, and Sally announces that she has to leave to attend the charity auction, so Michael decides to bid on Sally. At the charity auction, Lindsay is still feeling the effects of the tranquilizer and no one is bidding on her, so Tobias asks Michael for some money to bid on his wife. Michael says that he has $5,000 that he needs to bid on Sally but that Tobias can make a low bid, but Tobias bids $5,000. George Michael makes Ann listen to the Jerky Boys, and after prank-calling Michael they share their first kiss. Michael agrees to give Stan his sports car if Stan will give him the money that he needs to bid on Sally. When Sally learns of the deal, she tells Michael that he can have the car back because she's sick of her father interfering with the men that she dates and does not want to be with someone her father approves of. When Gob learns that Stan is bidding on Lucille 2, he spends all the money that his mother gave to him to bid on her.

=== On the next Arrested Development... ===
George Sr. goes to bid for Lucille at the charity auction, but is attacked by a wolf.

== Production ==
"Burning Love" was directed by Paul Feig, and written by supervising producer Chuck Martin and Lisa Parsons. It was Feig's fourth directing credit, Martin's fifth writing credit and Parsons' first and only writing credit. It was the ninth episode of the season to be filmed.

== Reception ==
=== Viewers ===
In the United States, the episode was watched by 6.96 million viewers on its original broadcast, an increase of over 1.5 million viewers from the previous episode, "Queen for a Day".

=== Critical reception ===
The A.V. Club writer Noel Murray commented on how "“Burning Love” is a largely pointless retread, padded out with some of the lamer gags of the series", and saying "The problem then with “Burning Love” is that it doesn’t plow ahead so much as circle back, repeating a main plot that the show had already done in season one." In 2019, Brian Tallerico from Vulture ranked the episode 65th out of the whole series, calling it "a pretty mediocre episode."
