= Arrested Development season 2 =

Season of television series

Arrested Development
- Season 2
- DVD cover
- Starring: Jason Bateman; Portia de Rossi; Will Arnett; Michael Cera; Alia Shawkat; Tony Hale; David Cross; Jeffrey Tambor; Jessica Walter
- No. of episodes: 18

Release
- Original network: Fox
- Original release: November 7, 2004 – April 17, 2005

Season chronology
- ← Previous; Season 1 Next → Season 3

The second season of Arrested Development, an American television series created by Mitchell Hurwitz, premiered on November 7, 2004, and concluded its initial airing on April 17, 2005. The eighteen-episode season was broadcast on Fox, an American broadcast television network.

Arrested Development, narrated by Ron Howard, follows the Bluth family, which consists of Michael (Jason Bateman), his twin sister Lindsay (Portia de Rossi), his older brother Gob (Will Arnett), his younger brother Buster (Tony Hale), their mother Lucille (Jessica Walter) and father George Sr. (Jeffrey Tambor), as well as Michael's son George Michael (Michael Cera), and Lindsay and her husband Tobias' (David Cross) daughter Maeby (Alia Shawkat). A formerly wealthy, dysfunctional family, the Bluths made their money from property development, before George Sr. was arrested for arrested for using his company's funds for personal expenses. Central storylines of the season include George Michael's relationship with his on-again-off-again girlfriend Ann Veal, George Sr.'s hiding in the Bluth model home's attic, and Lucille's affair with Oscar, George Sr.'s twin brother.

The second season received acclaim from critics, who lauded it as overwhelmingly better than the first. It was nominated for multiple awards, notably for 11 Emmys, the highest amount a single season of the series ever received. A preview of the season was released several weeks prior to its premiere. It was released on DVD in region 1 on October 11, 2005, in region 2 on January 23, 2006, and in region 4 on March 15, 2006.

== Production ==
=== Renewal ===
A promotional image for season two showcasing the main cast.

The series was not immediately renewed for another season like the rest of Fox's programming was in April 2004. Portia de Rossi, who portrays Lindsay, said in an interview that she was worried about the possibility the series would not be renewed for a second season, because she had grown very close to her co-stars during the first season. Jason Bateman said that he was sure the series would be renewed, as Gail Berman, a Fox executive, was a fan of the series; oppositely, David Cross felt the series would be cancelled before a second season could be ordered, citing its low ratings as a reason. The series was soon picked up for a full 22-episode second season. However, its production order was later cut down to 18 episodes by Fox in order to save air time for American Dad!.

=== Development ===
For season two, series creator Mitchell Hurwitz served as the showrunner, as well as the co-executive producer with Dean Lorey, Richard Day, Tom Saunders, Jim Vallely, and Chuck Tatham. John Amodeo was the season's main producer, while Maria Semple was the consulting producer; Sam Laybourne and Karey Dornetto were staff writers.

Hurwitz encouraged the writers of the season to experiment and take more risks when writing scripts. This helped spawn the season's reoccurring storyline of Buster losing his hand by a seal attack, which was originally pitched as a joke concept in an email. After it was decided to create a storyline out of the attack, Hurwitz went back to previous episodes of the season to add more foreshadowing to it.

=== Casting ===
The main cast of the series all returned for season two, including Jason Bateman, Portia de Rossi, Jessica Walter, and Jeffrey Tambor. Starting with the season, Ann's original actress—Alessandra Torresani—would be replaced by Mae Whitman. Originally, the plan was to replace Ann's actress with every subsequent appearance following Whitman's casting, but it was considered too convoluted and Whitman remained as Ann.

== Release ==
A preview of some episodes of the second season was released onto Fox's official website in October 2004, several weeks prior to its premiere. The season began airing on November 7, 2004, and concluded on April 17, 2005. The series' time slot was moved to it airing after The Simpsons in November 2004. In 2006, the first three seasons of the series became available to watch for free on Microsoft's nascent internet video streaming service MSN.

== Episodes ==
No. overall	No. in season	Title	Directed by	Written by	Original release date	Prod. code	US viewers (millions)
23	1	"The One Where Michael Leaves"	Lee Shallat Chemel	Mitchell Hurwitz & Richard Rosenstock	November 7, 2004	2AJD01	6.61
Michael Bluth (Jason Bateman) and George Michael (Michael Cera), leave for Phoenix, but go back to ensure the family misses them, and, following George Sr.'s (Jeffrey Tambor) arrest, Michael must locate the company checkbook. Lindsay (Portia de Rossi), desires for an open marriage with her husband Tobias (David Cross), who tries to join the Blue Man Group, assuming they are a support group for depressed men. Lucille (Jessica Walter) signs Buster (Tony Hale) up for the Army after being persuaded to do so by a Michael Moore lookalike. Gob (Will Arnett) becomes president of the Bluth company, and stumbles upon a contract between George Sr. and Saddam Hussein.
24	2	"The One Where They Build a House"	Patty Jenkins	Mitchell Hurwitz & Jim Vallely	November 14, 2004	2AJD02	7.22
Trying to save the company, Gob promises a model house for a new development in only 2 weeks, forcing everyone in the family to help him build a fake house that is empty on the inside; it ultimately collapses in front of a crowd of people, sparking a fight between Michael and Gob. George Sr. continues his escape to Mexico, but is imprisoned by officers who have been scarred by faulty products he manufactured decades prior. Lindsay makes a date with an actor (Thomas Jane) who is attempting to get in character for an upcoming role, assuming he is a homeless man, and Tobias spies on the two of them.
25	3	"¡Amigos!"	Lee Shallat Chemel	Brad Copeland	November 21, 2004	2AJD03	5.89
Lucille hires a private detective to locate George Sr., who finds out that he is hiding out in Mexico. Michael goes to collect his father, accompanied by George Michael and his girlfriend Ann. Gob hires a bounty hunter named Ice to keep tabs on Michael, with Lindsay, accompanied by her daughter Maeby, trying to enact an affair between herself and Ice. Buster hides in the back of the family car to escape his Army duties in Mexico, but ends up just going directly back to his house, unbeknownst to him. Michael does not find George Sr., and the family leaves, unaware that a funeral for him is being held concurrently in Mexico.
26	4	"Good Grief"	Jeff Melman	John Levenstein	December 5, 2004	2AJD04	6.66
Ann breaks up with George Michael, citing the two of them constantly being interrupted by Michael's antics as the reason. Ice reveals to the family that George Sr. has reportedly been executed in Mexico. The family holds a wake, and decides not to tell Buster in fear of the news upsetting him. Gob attempts to perform an illusion at the burial in which he is buried in place of his father's body, which upsets Buster, who realizes he is at a funeral; Buster, disturbed by the news, lets go of the casket and causes it to collapse onto Gob, leaving him stuck. George Michael, walking outside of the house, depressed by his breaking up and grandfather's death, discovers George Sr. alive in an underground bunker, subsequently hiding him in the attic. When Michael finds out, he tells the family, who, upon checking the attic, find an open window and no sign of George Sr. After everyone but Michael leaves, George Sr. emerges from a hiding spot and begs to continue hiding in the attic, which Michael agrees to.
27	5	"Sad Sack"	Peter Lauer	Barbie Adler	December 12, 2004	2AJD05	6.28
George Sr. is concerned about the romance growing between his twin brother Oscar and Lucille. The prosecutor turns up new evidence supporting the Bluths' "light treason" charge.
28	6	"Afternoon Delight"	Jason Bateman	Abraham Higginbotham & Chuck Martin	December 19, 2004	2AJD06	5.62
After getting roasted at the company Christmas party, Gob fires the entire staff and Michael must find a way to rehire them. Meanwhile, Buster plays hooky from the army.
29	7	"Switch Hitter"	Paul Feig	Story by : Courtney Lilly; Teleplay by : Barbie Adler	January 16, 2005	2AJD07	5.78
Armed with Michael's good ideas, Gob goes to work for their competitor, Stan Sitwell. George Sr. thinks Sitwell is just trying to win the company softball game.
30	8	"Queen for a Day"	Andrew Fleming	Brad Copeland	January 23, 2005	2AJD08	5.20
When the Bluth company stock is unfrozen, Michael sells his shares to buy a new Corvette and Tobias uses his shares to purchase a gay nightclub called the "Queen Mary".
31	9	"Burning Love"	Paul Feig	Chuck Martin & Lisa Parsons	January 30, 2005	2AJD09	6.96
Michael pursues childhood crush Sally Sitwell, Lindsay tries to entice a right-wing actor by wearing her mother's furs, and Gob and Lucille 2 continue their illicit relationship. George Michael stages a Christian music bonfire for his girlfriend Ann. George Sr. installs a hot-tub in his attic hideout.
32	10	"Ready, Aim, Marry Me!"	Paul Feig	Jim Vallely & Mitchell Hurwitz	February 13, 2005	2AJD10	5.61
Thinking Lucille 2 (the majority shareholder) and Stan Sitwell are plotting against the Bluth company, Michael sets up Lindsay to go on a romantic get-away with her fake Uncle Jack on the condition that Jack will bail out the company again. Gob and Buster follow Lucille 2 and Stan on their date.
33	11	"Out on a Limb"	Danny Leiner	Chuck Martin & Jim Vallely	March 6, 2005	2AJD11	6.34
Gob's wife files for divorce. Michael learns that former lover (and known liar) Maggie Lizer is pregnant, so he has Tobias and Lindsay break into her house to collect a urine sample to confirm her pregnancy. Buster swims in the ocean and has his hand bitten off by a loose seal.
34	12	"Hand to God"	Joe Russo	Mitchell Hurwitz & Chuck Martin	March 6, 2005	2AJD12	5.75
Buster tries to come to terms with the loss of his hand. Michael tries to find a way out of raising Maggie's baby.
35	13	"Motherboy XXX"	Joe Russo	Mitchell Hurwitz & Jim Vallely	March 13, 2005	2AJD13	6.08
Ashamed of Buster's missing hand, Lucille recruits George Michael to compete in the 30th annual "Motherboy" contest with her.
36	14	"The Immaculate Election"	Anthony Russo	Barbie Adler & Abraham Higginbotham	March 20, 2005	2AJD14	5.73
George Michael runs a doomed campaign for class president against Steve Holt. Lindsay kicks Tobias out, but he returns as their singing British housekeeper, Mrs. Featherbottom.
37	15	"Sword of Destiny"	Peter Lauer	Brad Copeland	March 27, 2005	2AJD17	4.72
Gob performs the Sword of Destiny illusion as Buster's assistant. Michael is hospitalized with appendicitis.
38	16	"Meat the Veals"	Joe Russo	Barbie Adler & Richard Rosenstock	April 3, 2005	2AJD15	5.33
Michael introduces the Bluths to Ann's conservative parents, hoping to turn them against George Michael and Ann's pre-engagement. Oscar throws Lucille an anniversary party.
39	17	"Spring Breakout"	Anthony Russo	Barbie Adler & Abraham Higginbotham	April 10, 2005	2AJD16	5.19
Michael checks Lucille into rehab, but she challenges Kitty to a drinking contest with George Sr. as the prize.
40	18	"Righteous Brothers"	Chuck Martin	Mitchell Hurwitz & Jim Vallely	April 17, 2005	2AJD18	5.99
The model home collapses. Tobias and Kitty head to Las Vegas together. George Michael and Maeby kiss.

== Cast ==
- Jason Bateman as Michael Bluth
- Portia de Rossi as Lindsay Bluth Fünke
- Will Arnett as Gob Bluth
- Michael Cera as George Michael Bluth
- Alia Shawkat as Maeby Fünke
- Tony Hale as Buster Bluth
- David Cross as Tobias Fünke
- Jeffrey Tambor as George Bluth, Sr. / Oscar Bluth
- Jessica Walter as Lucille Bluth
- Ron Howard as Narrator (uncredited)

== Themes ==
By season 2, Arrested Development delved further into absurdist humor than the first. An example of this comes when, in the 15th episode of the season, Michael makes a metatextual reference to the season's episode count being cut from 22 to 18, which Empire writer Angie Errigo described as a "defiantly clever" moment of absurd comedy from the season. It utilized the "strange" status quo developed in the first season and expanded upon it, creating a more uniquely strange season that still felt tonally similar.

== Reception ==
=== Ratings ===
Ratings for season two were "slightly" better than the first; the season averaged about six million viewers. During the season, Arrested Development ranked 115th out of all prime-time shows in terms of viewership. The second-season premiere "The One Where Michael Leaves" received a 2.4 rating share in the Nielsen ratings among viewers age 18 to 49, attracting 6.61 million viewers overall. The succeeding episode, "The One Where They Build a House", received a 2.6 share in the same Nielsen ratings demographic and drew in 7.22 million viewers, the highest of the season. Both of these ratings significantly built upon the viewing figures of the previous season finale. The lowest ratings belonged to "Sword of Destiny" with 4.72 million viewers and a 1.7 share.

=== Critical reception ===
In its second season, Arrested Development was met with widespread critical acclaim. On Rotten Tomatoes, the season has an approval rating of 94% with an average score of 8.3 out of 10 based on 18 reviews. The website's critical consensus reads, "Arrested Development's second season doubles down on the absurd antics and densely layered gags, cementing the Bluths as TV's best worst family." On the review aggregator website Metacritic, the second season scored 88 out of 100, based on 17 reviews, indicating "Universal acclaim."

Nick Venable of CinemaBlend praised the season, hailing it as better than the first. Venable highlights the season's many sight gags—along with verbal and physical gags—as the reason he found it so compelling.

=== Awards and nominations ===
In 2005, the second season received eleven Emmy nominations in seven categories with one win. It was nominated for Outstanding Comedy Series, Outstanding Lead Actor in a Comedy Series (Jason Bateman), Outstanding Supporting Actor in a Comedy Series (Jeffrey Tambor), Outstanding Supporting Actress in a Comedy Series (Jessica Walter), Outstanding Writing for a Comedy Series (Barbie Adler for "Sad Sack" and Brad Copeland for "Sword of Destiny"); Outstanding Casting for a Comedy Series; Outstanding Single-Camera Picture Editing for a Comedy Series (three nominations). The episode "Righteous Brothers", written by Mitchell Hurwitz and Jim Vallely won for Outstanding Writing for a Comedy Series.

The second season also received two Golden Globe nominations in two categories with one win. It was nominated for Best Series Musical or Comedy, and Jason Bateman won for Best Performance in a Musical or Comedy.

== Home media ==
The second season was released on DVD in region 1 on October 11, 2005, in region 2 on January 23, 2006 and in region 4 on March 15, 2006. Special features include commentary by series creator Mitchell Hurwitz and cast members on "Good Grief", "Ready, Aim, Marry Me!" and "Righteous Brothers"; deleted and extended scenes; "Season One in 3 Minutes" overview; blooper reel; "The Immaculate Election" campaign videos.
