= Queen for a Day (Arrested Development) =

- Arrested Development episode
- Episode no.: Season 2 Episode 8
- Directed by: Andrew Fleming
- Written by: Brad Copeland
- Cinematography by: Greg Harrington
- Editing by: Richard Candib
- Production code: 2AJD08
- Original air date: January 23, 2005
- Running time: 22 minutes

Guest appearances
- Liza Minnelli as Lucille Austero; Ed Begley Jr. as Stan Sitwell; Mo Collins as Starla; Jeff Garlin as Mort Meyers; Henry Winkler as Barry Zuckerkorn

Episode chronology
← Previous "Switch Hitter"	Next → "Burning Love"
- Arrested Development season 2

"Queen for a Day" is the eighth episode of the second season of the American television satirical sitcom Arrested Development. It is the 30th overall episode of the series, and was written by producer Brad Copeland and directed by Andrew Fleming. It originally aired on Fox on January 23, 2005.

The series, narrated by Ron Howard, follows the Bluths, a formerly wealthy, dysfunctional family, who made their money from property development. The Bluth family consists of Michael, his twin sister Lindsay, his older brother Gob, his younger brother Buster, their mother Lucille and father George Sr., as well as Michael's son George Michael, and Lindsay and her husband Tobias' daughter Maeby. In the episode, when the Bluth company stock is unfrozen, Michael sells his shares to buy a new Corvette and Tobias uses his shares to purchase a gay nightclub called the "Queen Mary".

== Plot ==
George Michael (Michael Cera) comes across a box of love letters he had written but never sent to Maeby (Alia Shawkat) and hides them in the attic. At the studio, Mort Meyers (Jeff Garlin) tells Maeby that he is waiting on notes for a pile of scripts he sent her. Buster (Tony Hale) asks Michael (Jason Bateman) to go dancing with him while he is on furlough, but Michael declines, so Tobias (David Cross) offers to go instead. Gob (Will Arnett), wanting a job at the Bluth Company after being fired by Stan Sitwell (Ed Begley Jr.), says that he wants a company car since he had one at Sitwell. George Sr. (Jeffrey Tambor) tells Michael how bored he is in the attic and asks for some reading material. Barry (Henry Winkler) tells Michael that the company stock is unfrozen, Michael asks if he could sell enough to buy a car, and Barry says as long as everyone doesn't sell it would be fine because they could lose control of the company.

After Maeby gets a paper cut from reading her scripts and quits, George Sr. is happy to have something to read and begins to make notes on them. Michael buys an expensive sports car, and Tobias brings Buster to the "Queen Mary" where he meets Lucille Austero (Liza Minnelli). Michael introduces Starla (Mo Collins) to Buster, as they share the same interests. Michael discovers that Lucille has had some work done in the bathroom, which stole some space from Lucille 2's apartment, and that she paid for it with her portion of the unfrozen stock. He learns that Gob is planning on buying a yacht, Lindsay promised her share to the country club, and Tobias had already bought the Queen Mary. Barry tells Michael that they're 2000 shares short of being the majority stock holders and the current majority stock holder is a company called Standpoor, which Michael assumes is Sitwell since it's the opposite, but Lucille tells him that it's Lucille 2's company.

Michael and Lucille decide to give Buster to Lucille Austero, taking him away from Starla. When Tobias is confronted by a group of roughnecks outside the Queen Mary, he recruits them as dancers. At the office, after Buster breaks up with Starla, Michael tells him to stick with her and says he'll take care of Lucille 2. Michael brings Lucille 2 for a ride in his new car, which retriggers her vertigo. Tobias takes his gang on the street where they meet a real gang they try to turn good and are subsequently beaten, with one of them being shot. Michael apologizes to Lucille 2 and confesses that the only reason Buster had asked her out that night was because they wanted to get control of the company again, and Lucille 2 says that she loves the Bluths and agrees to give Michael the shares necessary for him to regain control of the company. Gob comes into Michael's office and says he slept with Lucille 2, so now she's not only not going to give the shares back but is also going to make Gob president of the company again.

=== On the next Arrested Development... ===
Lucille 2 pushes her wall back, giving Lucille Bluth's bathroom less space, Tobias sells the Queen Mary to Barry, and Gob becomes needy with Lucille 2.

== Production ==
"Queen for a Day" was directed by Andrew Fleming and written by producer Brad Copeland. It was Fleming's first and only directing credit and Copeland's fifth writing credit. It was the eighth episode of the season to be filmed.

== Reception ==
=== Viewers ===
In the United States, the episode was watched by 5.20 million viewers on its original broadcast.

=== Critical reception ===
The A.V. Club writer Noel Murray praised the episode, and commented on how "After several consecutive Arrested Development episodes with strong main plots alongside the subplots and serialization, “Queen For A Day” is pretty heavily skewed to the serialized side". In 2019, Brian Tallerico from Vulture ranked the episode 68th out of the whole series, calling it "yet another mid-season sag of an episode."
