= Hand to God (Arrested Development) =

- Arrested Development episode
- Episode no.: Season 2 Episode 12
- Directed by: Joe Russo
- Written by: Mitchell Hurwitz; Chuck Martin
- Cinematography by: Greg Harrington
- Editing by: Richard Candib
- Production code: 2AJD12
- Original air date: March 6, 2005
- Running time: 22 minutes

Guest appearances
- Henry Winkler as Barry Zuckerkorn; Jerry Minor as Officer Carter; Jay Johnston as Officer Taylor; Ian Roberts as Literal Doctor; Julia Louis-Dreyfus as Maggie Lizer; Joe Russo as Joe

Episode chronology
← Previous "Out on a Limb"	Next → "Motherboy XXX"
- Arrested Development season 2

"Hand To God" is the twelfth episode of the second season of the American television satirical sitcom Arrested Development. It is the 34th overall episode of the series, and was written by series creator Mitchell Hurwitz and supervising producer Chuck Martin, and directed by Joe Russo. It originally aired on Fox on February 13, 2005, airing back-to-back with the previous episode, "Out on a Limb".

The series, narrated by Ron Howard, follows the Bluths, a formerly wealthy, dysfunctional family, who made their money from property development. The Bluth family consists of Michael, his twin sister Lindsay, his older brother Gob, his younger brother Buster, their mother Lucille and father George Sr., as well as Michael's son George Michael, and Lindsay and her husband Tobias' daughter Maeby. In the episode, Buster tries to come to terms with the loss of his hand, and Michael tries to find a way out of raising Maggie's baby.

== Plot ==
Michael (Jason Bateman) tells George Michael (Michael Cera) about Maggie Lizer's (Julia Louis-Dreyfus) baby, whom Michael thinks is his. Michael and George Michael meet Lucille (Jessica Walter) and Oscar (Jeffrey Tambor) at the hospital for Buster's (Tony Hale) injury in the ocean, where the doctor (Ian Roberts) tells them that Buster has lost his left hand by saying "he's all right". Buster and Michael talk about the baby, with Buster telling Michael to go to Maggie since he obviously still has feelings for her. Michael decides for the sake of the baby he needs to win Maggie back and tells her that he wants to rekindle their relationship for more reasons than just the baby. Although Maggie finally confesses that Michael is not really the father, he continues his commitment to her undeterred. Buster returns from the hospital, fitted with a metal hook prosthetic, to find the family gathered in Lucille's penthouse for a welcome home party. Gob (Will Arnett) arrives at the party ignorant of Buster's accident and is scared by Buster's hook.

At the party, Lucille confesses to Michael that Buster's accident was her fault because she prayed for God to take anything to stop Buster from going to war. Gob also confesses to Michael that he released a seal into the ocean that bit Buster. Still not convinced that Maggie is not lying, Michael asks Lindsay (Portia de Rossi) to break into Maggie's house to find evidence that someone else is the father, but Lindsay refuses. He gets George Michael to help instead, and they go to Maggie's house to try to find some evidence of another man. After a brief run in with a police officer, George Michael grabs a note taped to the door that reads "Really eager to hear from you" written under a phone number, and Michael thinks it's from the real baby's father. Gob goes to the docks to rent a boat to try to find the seal while Maeby (Alia Shawkat) films a remake of The Old Man and the Sea. Using Gene Parmesan to trace the phone number he had found on the door to an address, Michael drives to the house where he believes the real father of Maggie's baby lives. Michael knocks on the door, and the same police officer from Maggie's house opens the door. Michael is invited inside, where he learns that Maggie's baby belongs to the police officer and his partner David, so Michael decides to help the cops get their baby from Maggie.

Maggie's client, an overweight waitress, is actually not fat but carrying the baby that Maggie had been hired to bear, and the urine that Tobias and Lindsay had tested had come from the waitress, not Maggie. The fat suit they had found had belonged to Maggie until she upgraded to a realistic latex model, which is what Michael saw. At the courthouse during the trial, the waitress's water breaks, and Maggie pretends she has gone into labor too. Back at the film set, Gob confesses to Maeby that he's probably responsible for Buster's hand being bitten off, and Maeby convinces him to tell Buster. Buster gouges Oscar in the shoulder while massaging him, then reacts with horror as he notices his hook as if for the first time and goes on a rampage, trashing Lucille's apartment. At that moment, Gob walks in and confesses he is responsible for Buster's hand, and Buster subsequently attacks him. Michael and the policemen find Maggie's room at the hospital, but when Michael grabs the baby she's cuddling it turns out to be the fat suit wrapped in a blanket. Maggie confesses that she "outsourced" the pregnancy to her client to add verisimilitude to her fat case. The cops retrieve their baby from the waitress and go home, George Michael is accidentally taken to the morgue, and Michael and Maggie have sex in her hospital room.

=== On the next Arrested Development... ===
After attacking Gob, Buster's hook is removed from Gob's ass, and Maggie gets a positive pregnancy result.

== Production ==
"Hand to God" was directed by Joe Russo, and written by series creator Mitchell Hurwitz and supervising producer Chuck Martin. It was Russo's eighth directing credit, Hurwitz's twelfth writing credit and Martin's seventh and final writing credit. Russo also guest stars as "Joe" in the episode. It was the twelfth episode of the season to be filmed.

== Reception ==
=== Viewers ===
In the United States, the episode was watched by 5.75 million viewers on its original broadcast, a decrease of almost 1 million viewers from the previous episode, "Out on a Limb".

=== Critical reception ===
The A.V. Club writer Noel Murray praised the episode and its predecessor, "Out on a Limb", saying "Mitchell Hurwitz already knows how to handle long-form storytelling". In 2019, Brian Tallerico from Vulture ranked the episode 32nd out of the whole series.
