= Troy Brenna =

American stunt performer

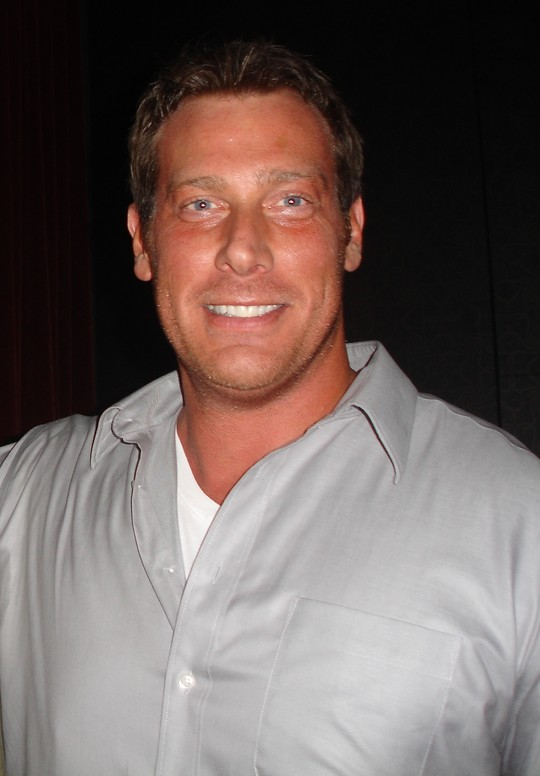
- Troy Brenna at the Hollywood premiere of "6th and Santa Fe" in 2008
- Born: May 8, 1970 (age 56)
- Occupations: Actor, stuntman

Troy Brenna (born May 8, 1970) is an American stunt actor, motion capture actor, stunt coordinator, and actor. He was born in Oconomowoc, Wisconsin. He has one younger brother and two older sisters. He has performed stunts for films such as X-Men, Thor, and Fast Five. He has acted in roles including Takers, Spy Next Door and television spots such as Arrested Development. He has also performed motion capture in films such as The Avengers.

== Filmography ==
=== Films ===
- Penance Lane (2014) - Stuntman/Duke
- Halo 4 (2012) - Motion Capture Performer
- R.I.P.D. (2013) - Motion Capture Performer
- The Avengers (2012) - Stunt Actor/Motion Capture Performer
- Thor (2011) - Stunts/Frost Giant
- Fast Five (2011) - Stunts/Brazilian Thug
- Xander Cohen (2012) - Stunt Coordinator/Big Ben
- Blood Shot (2011) - Stunts/Genie
- Cowboys & Aliens (2011) -Stunt Actor/Motion Capture Performer
- Priest (2011) - Stunts
- Takers (2010) - Stuntman/Sweatpants
- The Spy Next Door (2010) - Stuntman/Russian Thug
- Sherlock Holmes - Robert Maillet Stunt Double (Uncredited)
- Avatar (2009) - Stunt Actor/Motion Capture Performer
- Cirque du Freak: The Vampire's Assistant (2009) - Stuntman/Vampanese
- Road to Moloch (2009) - Stunts
- Fast & Furious (2009) - Stunts
- Star Trek (2009) - Stuntman/Klingon
- Blood and Bone (2009) - Stuntman/Viktor
- The Seed - Stunts
- Judgement Date (2009) - Stunt Coordinator/Bouncer
- Get Smart (2008) - Stunts (Uncredited)
- The God Project (2008) - Stunt Coordinator/Assaulter
- The Rundown (2003) - Stunts
- Bobby Z (2007) - Stunts/Prison Guard
- The Marine (2006) - Stunts
- Ultraviolet (2006) - Stunts
- Today You Die (2005) - Stuntman/Body Guard
- The Amateurs (2005) - Stuntman/Earnest Pike
- El Padrino (2004) - Rolph Mueller Stunt Double
- Hulk (2003) - Eric Bana Stunt Double
- Cradle 2 the Grave (2003) - Stuntman/Cage Fighter
- The Scorpion King (2002) - Tyler Mane/King Stunt Double
- 3000 Miles to Graceland (2001) - Stunts
- X-Men (2000) - Tyler Mane/Sabertooth Stunt Double
- The Postman (1997) - Abraham Benrubi Stunt Double
- Volcano (1997) - Stunts
- The Pest (1997) - Stunts

=== Television ===
- Supah Ninjas (2012) - Stuntman/Big Show Stunt Double
- Wizards of Waverly Place (2011) - Stuntman/Washong
- I'm in the Band (2011) - Stuntman/Mega Burger
- My Name is Earl (2009) - Stuntman/Jack/Matt Willig Stunt Double
- NCIS (TV series) (2008) - Stuntman/Kidnapper
- Chuck (TV series) (2007) - Stuntman/Thug
- Bones (TV series) (2006) - Stuntman/Monroe
- Dollhouse (TV series) - Stunts
- CSI: NY - Stunts
- The Bachelor - Stunts
- Scrubs (TV series) (2007) - Stuntman/College Footballer
- Inside the Action - Stunt Driving
- Inside the Action 2 - Stunts
- Fallen (TV miniseries) - Stunts
- Cane (TV series) (2007) - Howard Stunt Double
- Alias (TV series) (2006) - Stuntman/Russian Thug
- American Dreams (2002) - Stunt Coordinator
- Arrested Development (TV series) (2005) - Stuntman/Dragon
- Wanted (2005 TV series) (2005) - Stuntman/Bouncer
- Star Trek: Enterprise (2001) - Stuntman/Klingon
- 10-8: Officers on Duty (2003) - Stuntman/Bunny
- Buffy the Vampire Slayer (TV series) (2002) - Stuntman/Avilas Demon/Vampire/Nesla Demon
- Angel (1999 TV series) (2002) - Stuntman/Prison Guest/Nesla Demon
- V.I.P. (American TV series) (2001) - Stuntman/Steroidal
- Martial Law (TV series) (1999) - Stuntman/Union Worker
- Married... with Children (1997) - Stuntman/Chicago Bear Center
- Rose Red (miniseries) (2002) - Stunts
