= Sword of Destiny (Arrested Development) =

- Arrested Development episode
- Episode no.: Season 2 Episode 15
- Directed by: Peter Lauer
- Written by: Brad Copeland
- Cinematography by: Greg Harrington
- Editing by: Robert Bramwell
- Production code: 2AJD17
- Original air date: March 27, 2005
- Running time: 22 minutes

Guest appearances
- Ben Stiller as Tony Wonder; Mo Collins as Starla; Ian Roberts as Literal Doctor; Dan Castellaneta as Dr. Stein; John Beard as himself

Episode chronology
| ← Previous "The Immaculate Election" | Next → "Meat the Veals" |
- Arrested Development season 2

"Sword of Destiny" is the fifteenth episode of the second season of the American television satirical sitcom Arrested Development. It is the 37th overall episode of the series, and was written by producer Brad Copeland and directed by Peter Lauer. It originally aired on Fox on March 27, 2005.

The series, narrated by Ron Howard, follows the Bluths, a formerly wealthy, dysfunctional family, who made their money from property development. The Bluth family consists of Michael, his twin sister Lindsay, his older brother Gob, his younger brother Buster, their mother Lucille and father George Sr., as well as Michael's son George Michael, and Lindsay and her husband Tobias' daughter Maeby. In the episode, Gob performs the Sword of Destiny illusion as Buster's assistant, and Michael is hospitalized with appendicitis.

== Plot ==
Tobias (David Cross) asks Michael (Jason Bateman) to become his assistant, when Michael feels a pain in his side. Gob (Will Arnett) goes to buy erection pills, where he buys the "Sword of Destiny" for his magic act. After visiting George Sr. (Jeffrey Tambor), who had asked Tobias to be a mole in the Bluth Company, Michael teaches George Michael (Michael Cera) how to drive. Michael goes to the hospital, where he finds out he has appendicitis. Gob asks Buster (Tony Hale) to help him with his magic act to outshine his rival Tony Wonder (Ben Stiller), who Buster and Gob meet at the Gothic Castle.

Tobias, as George Sr.'s mole, fills in for Michael at the company, while Lindsay (Portia de Rossi) lets George Michael drive. During the magic act, Gob knocks off Buster's mechanical hand, which the audience and Tony believe was part of the act. Tony hires Buster and Gob to appear on his DVD, while Michael wakes up from his appendectomy annoyed that George Michael has started driving without him. The doctor (Dan Castellaneta) informs Michael that he has a bacterial infection from the operation, meaning he will need another operation.

Meanwhile, the FBI has located George Sr. from a video he had recorded of himself and think he is in Iraq. Gob and Buster meet with Tony Wonder, with Gob telling Tony that the real Sword of Destiny trick has yet to be performed. Michael wakes up from his second surgery, but the doctor tells him they might have left a pair of scissors in him. Michael and George Michael head to the office as Tobias and the FBI arrive at his hospital room to prove Michael isn't in Iraq. At the office, Michael finds the company has moved down a floor to save costs. Gob performs the Sword of Destiny act, where Buster swaps the fake sword with a real one and accidentally cuts off Gob's fingers. Michael lets George Michael drive home, but he hits Michael with the car.

=== On the next Arrested Development... ===
In the hospital, Michael and Gob become roommates, and the FBI finds footage of George Michael on the video of George Sr., thinking he is a terrorist.

== Production ==
"Sword of Destiny" was directed by Peter Lauer and written by producer Brad Copeland. It was Lauer's second directing credit and Copeland's sixth and final writing credit. It was the seventeenth and penultimate episode of the season to be filmed.

== Reception ==
=== Viewers ===
In the United States, the episode was watched by 4.72 million viewers on its original broadcast, a decrease of over 1 million viewers from the previous episode, "The Immaculate Election".

=== Critical reception ===
The A.V. Club writer Noel Murray commented on negatives of the episode, saying "The first two-thirds of Arrested Development's second season is so tightly constructed that by comparison, the last third seems to be more of a mess than it actually is." Murray also commented on the episode feeling "like a grab bag of disconnected scenes, characters, and in-jokes, held together by excessive interjections from The Narrator, some sloppy ADR, and, oh yeah, comedy." Brian Tallerico from Vulture ranked the episode 25th out of the whole series, saying "Ben Stiller delivers one of the best-ever Arrested Development cameos as Tony Wonder".

=== Accolades ===
Brad Copeland was nominated for Outstanding Writing for a Comedy Series at the 57th Primetime Emmy Awards for "Sword of Destiny".
