= Ann Veal =

Fictional character on Arrested Development

- Arrested Development character
- Ann Veal, as she appears in season two
- First appearance: "Let 'Em Eat Cake" (2004)
- Last appearance: "A New Attitude" (2013)
- Portrayed by: Alessandra Torresani (season 1); Mae Whitman (season 2–4)

In-universe information
- Children: Unnamed child with Tony Wonder
- Relatives: Terry Veal (father); Mrs. Veal (mother)

Ann Paul Veal is a fictional character from the American television satirical sitcom Arrested Development. Portrayed by Mae Whitman for most of the series, after Alessandra Torresani in season one, she is the bland, religious girlfriend of George Michael Bluth. They have an on-again, off-again relationship that ends when Ann begins to date Gob, which culminates in Gob and Tony Wonder, her baby's father, unknowingly having sex.

Whitman got the role for Ann through being friends with series regular Alia Shawkat, and her audition went successfully. Ann was meant to be replaced with a different actress upon each new appearance, but Whitman's performance was considered to be perfectly forgettable, and so she was kept on permanently. A big fan of Arrested Development, Whitman was not immediately asked to return for the series' fourth season revival, but was soon given a reoccurring role related to Gob.

Ann has received critical acclaim in retrospective reviews of the series, and her relationship with Michael has been hailed as one of the series' best bits. The themes of her character and the Veal family overall have been explored by both authors and critics.

== Character and storylines ==
Arrested Development is an American television satirical sitcom created by Mitchell Hurwitz for the Fox Network, before it was revived on Netflix starting with the fourth season; it follows the formerly wealthy, fundamentally dysfunctional Bluth family. Ann, born Ann Paul Veal, first appears at the end of season one, where she is introduced to George Michael Bluth—the son of series protagonist Michael Bluth—and her characteristics already begin to emerge, particularly her being "bland". Soon thereafter, George Michael and Ann would have an on-again, off-again relationship, ultimately culminating in a breakup—and subsequent reunion—in "Good Grief"; the two would break up for good by the end of the third season. Ann, along with her entire family, is a devout Christian, and she is the daughter of a pastor, Mr. Veal; her family plays a major role in her characterization, but they are largely unseen until "Meat the Veals".

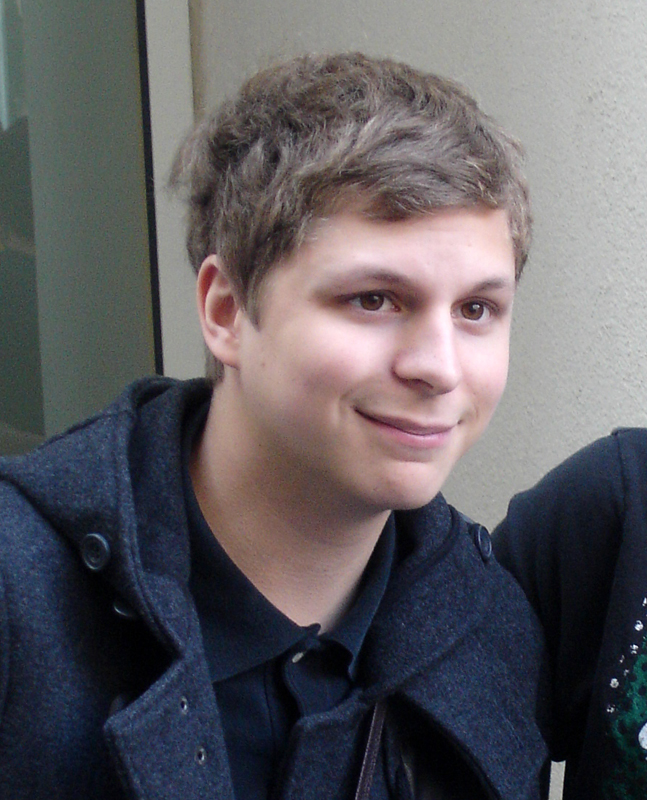
George Michael (portrayed by Michael Cera, pictured) acts as Ann's boyfriend early in the series.

She has a negative relationship with Michael, who often ignores her, occasionally misremembering her name and either going "Her?" when asked about her by George Michael, or using various other inanimate objects to refer to her by, such as "Egg". Ann's bland personality and looks are often criticized by the Bluth family, despite being both normal-looking and not "objectionable". Despite appearing regular and even innocent, Ann is often shown to be perverted, and even requests for George Michael to have sex with her at the end of season two. She plays a particularly large role in "Development Arrested", the third season finale, where it is revealed that she has been seeing George Michael's uncle Gob. Ann's first interaction with Gob came several episodes earlier in "Notapusy", where she received third place in an "inner beauty" pageant, where Gob acted as a judge, beginning a relationship between them.

In season four, Ann continues to date Gob, and they become engaged after a miscommunication from him. He, unwilling to marry Ann, stages a magical illusion where he traps himself in a cave with the plan to return alive in two weeks, as a way to prove himself to be stronger than Jesus. However, the illusion goes wrong, and, after a series of mishaps, Gob gets his way and ditches Ann. When Gob sees Ann again, she is pregnant, and she tells him that it's the baby of Gob's magician rival, Tony Wonder. Ann, looking to end both her communication with both Tony and Gob, tricks the two into having sex with each other, and leaves.

== Casting and creation ==
In Ann's first appearance, she was portrayed by Alessandra Torresani. In "The One Where They Build a House, Ann was recast, now played by Mae Whitman, who would become her permanent actor. Whitman was friends with Alia Shawkat, a fellow Arrested Development cast member, at that time, and had spent much of her time hanging out with her and George Michael's actor, Michael Cera, on set; this friendship gave her the opportunity to audition, where producer and writer Jim Vallely found her performance to be humorous, and she was given the part. Initially, there was a plan to replace Ann's actress with every subsequent appearance, but Whitman's performance was considered so "non-memorable" that she was kept on for the remainder of the series.

Whitman has asserted that she is a big fan of Arrested Development and feels joyous at the fact that she was part of it. Initially, Whitman wasn't invited back for the series' revival, and she pleaded to series creator Mitchell Hurwitz to let her play Ann again; she reported in an interview with Hollywood.com that Ann would "at least" be seen in the background of an episode. Ann would ultimately return in the fourth season, beginning with the seventh episode, "Colony Collapse". To promote the season, a text-message service was created where interested parties could text "ANN" to a mobile phone number—which spells out EGG-VEAL in phoneword—and be notified when it is released; a further Ann reference is included after sending a message to the number, where an automated reply, "Her?", was sent to the recipient. Whitman praised Ann's storyline with Gob, and said that she would "love" to see the revival explore that relationship. She also expressed enjoyment with Ann's perverted nature, finding it to be exemplary of how suppressing those urges can lead one to heavily rely on them in adulthood.

== Analysis ==
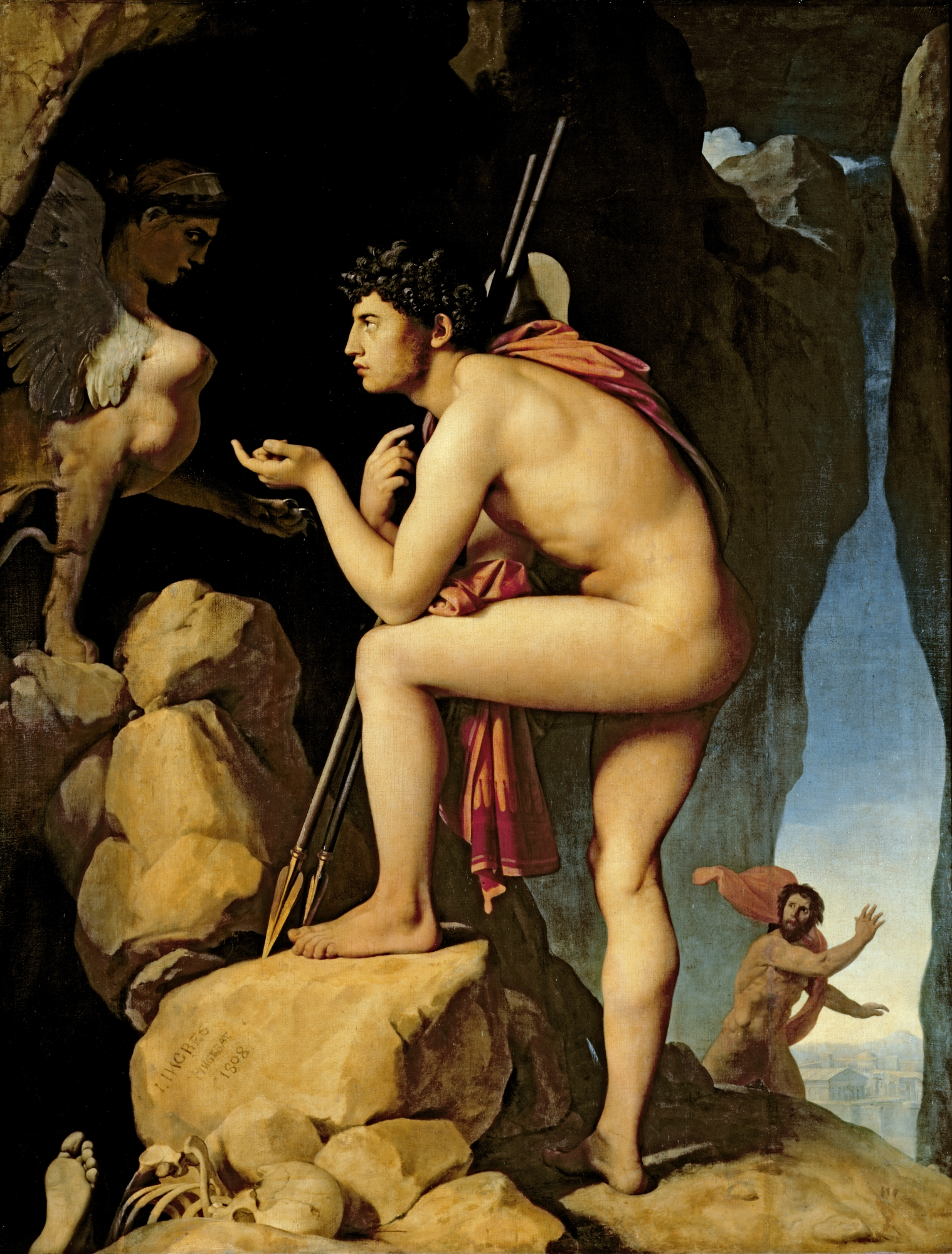
Oedipuss' themes have been compared to Gob and George Michael, both dating Ann.

One gag that Ann is usually the recipient of is the Freudian concept of the "slip of the tongue", with Michael either saying something inherently offensive about Ann—whether that be her looks, personality, or how forgettable she is—or misremembering her name and confusing her with other known-to-be-bland things like eggs. Author Navid Sabet asserted that Gob and George Michael both dating Ann reinforces a common incestuous theme of the mythical Greek king Oedipus, whose tale explores indirect sexual contact with the same woman, as still sharing "identical bodily fluids" and committing an immoral act. Ann has been used as the prime example of a "young evangelical Christian", holding strong conservative values and believing in chastity commitments. (Note: As seen when Ann's family is overjoyed that she and Gob get engaged after first having sex.) This all comes together in "Meat the Veals", where Ann's intense beliefs and perceived prudish nature lead to her understanding of the secular world as being an "enticing den of sensual disinhibition". It explores how "bland" Ann and her family are for their beliefs, while also using the Bluth family's relation to Ann as a way to portray atheists as sexually uninhibited and much more carefree than religious individuals; this shows how people like the Veals, a religious family who puts their faith before anything else, would see the morally corrupt Bluths and assume they are "wildcards" that would prove dangerous when mixed into their family values. Kristopher Phillips wrote of the changing of Ann's actresses in the context of Aristotle's philosophies, particularly his teaching that "each species has some specifically defining feature" that makes them look unique. However, he also argues that Ann's two portrayals are more akin to Aristotle's other belief, that the internal properties of a person are more defining than their looks, whether those properties be "accidental" or "essential", (Note: "Accidental" being properties that come into a person's lives later, and "essential" being ones that they are born with.) which is the reason why the changing of her looks doesn't change the fact that she is still inherently Ann.

== Reception ==
Whitman's portrayal of the character was considered a step up from Torresani's. MovieWeb writer Matthew Perrino praised Whitman as one of the best television recasts of all time, writing that she outshone Torresani and was the "definitive" version of the character. Noel Murray of The A.V. Club shared a similar sentiment, calling Whitman's Ann "the real Ann" and describing Whitman's debut as "full-blown", reacting enthusiastically towards the humorous scene where she eats both an egg and mayonnaise. Author Kristopher Phillips described the change between actresses as practically "seamless", praising the series for finding two different people who both have a similar lack of distinguishing features. Whitman would receive particular praise for her role in "Colony Escape". Eric Goldman of IGN praised her performance in the episode, highlighting certain gags like Ann's long-zipper pajamas and "nonplussed reactions", as well as feeling Will Arnett's portrayal of Gob clashed well with Ann's personality. The zipper gag was also highlighted by Vulture's Zach Dionne, along with the jokes Ann is given during the wedding scene. In his assessment of the episode, David Rockne Corrigan of the National Post wrote that he always considered Ann to be one of his favorite characters from the series, and felt that she continued to work throughout "Colony Collapse".

Her and Michael's running gag—involving him completely forgetting about her existence—has been praised as one of the greatest running gags to come from the series. IGN's Matt Fowler wrote highly of the bit, putting it on his list of Michael's best moments, finding it to showcase both how "horrifically bland" Ann is, but also how much Michael cares for George Michael and only wants the best for him, despite the fact that he acts offensively towards Ann as a result. Fowler also theorizes that Michael is being intentionally forgetful about Ann, disliking her so much as to pretend that he isn't aware of how dismissive he is of her. Jillian Mapes of Rolling Stone similarly listed it as one of the series's best running gags, highlighting how much the Bluth family seems to dislike her, the absurdity of the bit, and, particularly, Michael's repeated line, "Her?", in regard to Ann, as the reasons why it works so well. The joke gives an extra layer to Michael and Ann's relationship, according to Flavorwire's Jason Bailey, allowing for more "edge" to be seen from Michael's character, and ultimately hailing it as "uproariously funny".
