= Mitchell Hurwitz =

American screenwriter (born 1963)

- Born: May 29, 1963 (age 63); Anaheim, California, U.S.
- Education: Georgetown University
- Occupations: Television writer, producer, actor
- Years active: 1989–present
- Spouse: Mary Jo Keenen (m. 1999)
- Children: 2

Mitchell Donald Hurwitz (born May 29, 1963) is an American television writer, producer, and actor. He is best known as the creator of the television sitcom Arrested Development as well as the co-creator of The Ellen Show. He was also a contributor to The John Larroquette Show and The Golden Girls.

== Early life ==
Hurwitz was born in 1963 to a Jewish family in Anaheim, California. In 1976, when Hurwitz was 12, he co-founded a chocolate-chip cookie business, called the Chipyard, on Balboa Boulevard in Balboa Fun Zone in Newport Beach, California, in a former taco place, with his older brother, Michael, and his father, Mark. The Chipyard is still in operation in Boston. He graduated from Estancia High School in Costa Mesa, California, and from Georgetown University in 1985 with a double major in English and theology.

== Early career ==
Hurwitz worked on several sitcoms in the 1980s and 1990s, including Nurses, The Golden Girls, The Golden Palace, The John Larroquette Show, The Ellen Show, and the Michael J. Fox-produced pilot Hench at Home. He created Everything's Relative, a midseason comedy starring Jeffrey Tambor and Jill Clayburgh for NBC in 1999.

== Arrested Development ==
Hurwitz was chosen by Ron Howard to create a sitcom about a rich dysfunctional family, which eventually turned into Arrested Development. Hurwitz wrote the pilot in 2002, which was filmed in March 2003. Fox added the show to its schedule in May. Despite laudatory reviews by television critics, Arrested Development received low ratings throughout its three-season run. In July 2004, the show was nominated for 7 Primetime Emmy Awards and won 5, including Outstanding Comedy Series, Outstanding Directing in a Comedy Series and Outstanding Writing in a Comedy Series.

In the second season, ratings decreased further and the show was cut down to 18 episodes instead of the planned 22 episodes. Nevertheless, the show was still critically acclaimed and was nominated for 11 Emmy Awards. In the show's third and final season on Fox, Hurwitz tried to keep Arrested Development on the air, but did not have the advertising funding to promote the series. The show was again cut down, from 18 episodes to 13. Fox announced the cancellation of the show before the production of the final five episodes.

After seven years off the air, Arrested Development returned for a fifteen-episode fourth season on the online movie and television streaming service Netflix on May 26, 2013. After yet another multi-year hiatus in which there was uncertainty of future seasons being developed, Netflix and the show's producers announced the development of a fifth season. The release was heralded by a re-edited twenty-two-episode version of the fourth season titled Season Four Remix: Fateful Consequences, released on Netflix on May 4, 2018. The fifth season consists of sixteen episodes, 8 of which were released simultaneously on May 29, 2018. The remaining 8 episodes were released simultaneously on March 15, 2019.

== Later projects ==
=== Series ===
Hurwitz created Fox's animated comedy Sit Down, Shut Up, based on the 2001 Australian TV series of the same name, for the 2008 season.

Hurwitz created Running Wilde, which aired for one season from 2010 to 2011. It was a collaboration with Arrested Development star Will Arnett.

Hurwitz signed a multiyear deal with Netflix in 2014. He executive produced Flaked starring Will Arnett and produced/co-created Lady Dynamite starring Maria Bamford for the network.

=== Pilots ===
Among Hurwitz's projects have been the US television adaptations of the British comedy shows The Thick of It (which was not picked up in the running for ABC's 2007–2008 TV season, though other networks such as HBO, Showtime and NBC have expressed interest) and Absolutely Fabulous.

My World And Welcome To It was a 2009 CBS television pilot, executive produced by Hurwitz, Jay Kogen, Kim Tannenbaum, and Barry Sonnenfeld. It was a comedy based on an earlier series My World and Welcome to It about being a dad in the 1960s which, in turn, drew material from James Thurber's collection of essays of the same name. Happiness Isn't Everything was also a 2009 CBS pilot, written by Hurwitz and Jim Vallely, starring Richard Dreyfuss, Jason Biggs, Ben Schwartz and Mary Steenburgen.

=== Acting ===
Hurwitz co-starred as "Cool Eric" in an episode of Workaholics titled "Dry Guys". Hurwitz plays a human resources representative who is aiding them in their pursuit of sobriety.

Hurwitz starred as "Koogler" in the Community episode "App Development and Condiments" (season 5, episode 8), which aired on March 6, 2014. He reprised the role in "Modern Espionage" (season 6, episode 11), which aired on May 19, 2015.

== Personal life ==
Hurwitz is married to actress Mary Jo Keenen. They have two daughters; May Asami, born in 2000, and Phoebe Hitomi born in 2002. The name of Arrested Development character "Maeby" was the result of combining the names of Hurwitz's daughters.

== Television ==
Year	Title	Role
1989	Heartland	Co-associate producer
1990	Empty Nest	Writer
1990–1991	Nurses	Writer and producer
1990–1992	The Golden Girls	Story editor, writer and executive producer
1992–1993	The Golden Palace	Writer and supervising producer
1993–1996	The John Larroquette Show	Writer and executive producer
1999	Everything's Relative	Creator, writer and executive producer
2001–2002	The Ellen Show	Co-creator, writer and executive producer
2002–2003	Less Than Perfect	Consulting producer
2003	Hench at Home	Pilot; co-creator, writer and executive producer
2003–2006; 2013–2019	Arrested Development	Creator, writer, executive producer and co-director of season 4
2007	The Thick of It	Pilot; developer, writer and executive producer
2009	Sit Down, Shut Up	Developer, writer and executive producer
2009	Happiness Isn't Everything	Pilot; co-creator, writer and executive producer
2009	Waiting to Die	Pilot; executive producer
2009	The Bridget Show	Pilot; executive producer
2009	Bless This Mess	Pilot; executive producer
2009	Absolutely Fabulous	Pilot; executive producer
2009	Brothers	Executive producer
2010	Wright vs. Wrong	Pilot; executive producer
2010	Team Spitz	Pilot; executive producer
2010	Lee Mathers	Pilot; producer
2010–2011	Running Wilde	Co-creator, writer, executive producer and directed "Basket Cases"
2011	In the Flow with Affion Crockett	Executive producer
2016	Flaked	Executive producer
2016–2017	Lady Dynamite	Co-creator, writer, executive producer and directed "Pilot"

=== As actor ===
Year	Title	Role	Notes
1993	Surf Ninjas	Surf Dude #2	
2007	Clark and Michael	Ramsay	2 episodes
2011	Workaholics	'Cool' Eric	Episode: "Dry Guys"
2013	Kroll Show	Jason Richards	2 episodes
2014–2015	Community	Koogler	2 episodes
2016–2017	Portlandia	Various roles	4 episodes
2016–2017	Animals.	Larry / Dad (voices)	2 episodes
2018	A Futile and Stupid Gesture	Time-Life Publisher	

== Awards ==
- 2004 Primetime Emmy Award for Outstanding Comedy Series – Won
- 2004 Primetime Emmy Award for Outstanding Writing for a Comedy Series – Won – "Pilot"
- 2005 Primetime Emmy Award for Outstanding Comedy Series – Nominated
- 2005 Primetime Emmy Award for Outstanding Writing for a Comedy Series – Won – "Righteous Brothers" (with Jim Vallely)
- 2006 Primetime Emmy Award for Outstanding Comedy Series – Nominated
- 2006 Primetime Emmy Award for Outstanding Writing for a Comedy Series – Nominated – "Arrested Development" (with Richard Day, Chuck Tatham and Jim Vallely)
- 2009 16th Annual Austin Film Festival – Outstanding Television Writer Award – Won
