= Michael Bluth =

- Arrested Development character
- Jason Bateman as Michael Bluth
- First appearance: "Pilot" (2003)
- Last appearance: "The Fallout" (2019)
- Created by: Mitchell Hurwitz
- Portrayed by: Jason Bateman

In-universe information
- Gender: Male
- Occupation: CEO and President of the Bluth Company; Manager of the Bluth Company (formerly)
- Family: George Bluth Sr. (father); Lucille Bluth (mother); Gob Bluth (brother); Lindsay Bluth Fünke (adoptive sister/biological aunt); Buster Bluth (half-brother/cousin); Annyong Bluth (adoptive brother)
- Spouse: Tracey Bluth (m. 1989; died 2001)
- Children: George Michael Bluth (son)
- Relatives: Oscar Bluth (uncle); Tobias Fünke (adoptive brother-in-law/uncle); Maeby Fünke (adoptive niece/biological cousin); Steve Holt (nephew)
- Education: University of Phoenix

Nichael "Michael" Bluth is a fictional character and the main protagonist of the American television satirical sitcom Arrested Development, created by Mitchell Hurwitz, and portrayed by Jason Bateman. Michael serves as the series' straight man, often leading his family through its many crises.

== Character history ==
Michael (born December 14, 1967) is the second oldest Bluth son, and the father of George Michael Bluth. He has an older brother, Gob (pronounced like the biblical character Job), a younger half-brother, Buster, and a twin sister, Lindsay (she is later revealed to be adopted and older than Michael). He also has an adopted Korean brother named Annyong, who is almost 20 years younger.

While his father George Sr. goes to jail, Michael becomes head of the family and CEO and President of the Bluth Company. His authority, however, is constantly undermined by his family. He remained President for all of Season 1, but was replaced by Gob in Season 2. As Vice President, Michael was the Bluth Company's de facto head, doing all the work of the President while being scrutinized by the SEC for his father's crimes. In Season 3, Michael was firmly in charge again, though the sibling rivalry and family interference did not totally recede.

Michael is the most functional and level-headed Bluth, but can occasionally be dishonest and selfish. He is usually the only source of stability for his family, much to his chagrin. Despite this, he has a problem letting go of control, and tends not to listen to his son's feelings when making decisions for him. He is especially critical of George Michael's girlfriend, Ann, often forgetting her name, and frequently referring to her as any number of random, only loosely appropriate monikers, including "Egg", "Bland", "Plant", "Yam", and (with thinly veiled disappointment and raised eyebrows) "Her?" He often threatens to leave the family out of frustration.

Michael's wife Tracy died (presumably of ovarian cancer) two years prior to the first season, and she was in a coma for some months before she passed. In the show, Michael is often reluctant to date, thinking that his son would disapprove, and most of his relationships have featured misunderstandings or outright deception. His wife's death is usually the subject of tasteless and unaware jokes made by his family members.

In season 3, it is revealed that there is a typo on his birth certificate and that his legal name is Nichael Bluth. Also, Michael discovers the truth about his father's crimes and his sister's identity. In the last episode, Michael and his son George Michael try once more to abandon the Bluth family by sailing away on a yacht, but after they arrive at the new home, they find that George Sr. was also on the yacht.

In season 4, Michael's fortunes decline swiftly and he becomes more petulant, narcissistic, and guile as he avoids a massive debt to Lucille Austero, manipulates his family into signing away their movie portrayal rights, and allows his relationship with George Michael to deteriorate by encroaching on his privacy, petulantly avoiding him, and carrying on a relationship with the same woman as his son. During this season, Michael attended University of Phoenix online; it is not specified whether he earned a degree from this institution nor if he earned a degree when he was younger from elsewhere.

Michael is the only character who has appeared in every episode of the series.

== Development ==
Michael is generally the straight man in the series. However, creator Mitch Hurwitz says that in some respects Michael is "the craziest one" in that he cannot see much of what happens around him.

Michael is portrayed by actor Jason Bateman. Hurwitz did not know if Bateman was right for the part as he seemed associated with more conventional sitcoms, but Hurwitz said that in trying out for the part, Bateman "gave this dry, confident performance". Bateman also explained his performance by saying he could be "naturally... dickish" like his character. Bateman said of his part, "it's the best job I've ever had, hands down," and it may have also been his most famous one.

== Reception ==
Bateman and his character were well received by critic Robert Bianco, who wrote "the key to the show's success is the hilariously deadpan Bateman".

Bateman was nominated for seven individual awards for his portrayal of Michael Bluth, winning three. In 2004, Bateman was nominated for the Screen Actors Guild Award for Outstanding Performance by a Male Actor in a Comedy Series. In 2004 and again in 2005, he was nominated for a Television Critics Association Award for Individual Achievement in Comedy. In 2005, Bateman was also nominated for Primetime Emmy Award for Outstanding Lead Actor in a Comedy Series. Bateman won the 2005 Golden Globe Award for Best Actor – Television Series Musical or Comedy and the 2005 Satellite Award for Best Actor – Television Series Musical or Comedy, which he won again in 2006. On July 18, 2013, Bateman was nominated again for the Primetime Emmy Award for Outstanding Lead Actor in a Comedy Series for his portrayal of Michael Bluth.

== See also ==
- List of Arrested Development characters
