= Storming the Castle =

- Arrested Development episode
- George Sr. looks at a window reflection resembling the Star of David, which prompts him to convert to Judaism.
- Episode no.: Season 1 Episode 9
- Directed by: Greg Mottola
- Written by: Brad Copeland
- Cinematography by: James Hawkinson
- Editing by: Lee Haxall
- Production code: 1AJD08
- Original air date: January 4, 2004
- Running time: 22 minutes

Guest appearances
- Liza Minnelli as Lucille Austero; Patricia Velásquez as Marta Estrella; Marc Grapey as Rollo

Episode chronology
← Previous "In God We Trust"	Next → "Pier Pressure"
- Arrested Development season 1

"Storming the Castle" is the ninth episode of the first season of the American television satirical sitcom Arrested Development. It was written by co-producer Brad Copeland and directed by Greg Mottola. It originally aired on Fox on January 4, 2004.

The series, narrated by Ron Howard, follows the Bluths, a formerly wealthy, dysfunctional family, who made their money from property development. The Bluth family consists of Michael, his twin sister Lindsay, his older brother Gob, his younger brother Buster, their mother Lucille and father George Sr., as well as Michael's son George Michael, and Lindsay and her husband Tobias' daughter Maeby. In the episode, after Lindsay says that Michael is too much of a "good guy" to make a move on Marta, he devises a plan to have Marta meet Gob's second lover during his magic act, while George Sr. discovers Judaism.

== Plot ==
Michael, George Michael and Lindsay discuss the ethical nature of leather chairs when they are interrupted by Marta, who is looking for Gob. Michael covers for his brother despite his feelings for Marta, and Lindsay points out that he is the good guy who will never win. George Michael agrees to go shopping with Maeby, who wants to rebel against Lindsay and her anti-leather stance by buying leather, and Michael is confronted by Rollo, a menacing man in a limousine, who gives him a message: tell Gob to "say goodbye to his legs." Michael visits Lucille's apartment and learns that she is trying to break up Buster and Lucille Austero. Meanwhile, Tobias, desperate for his daughter's approval, decides to support her apparent newfound interest by getting his own "leather daddy" outfit.

Michael finds Gob at the Playtime Pizza Theater, where he has been forced to work since being kicked out of the Magician's Alliance. Michael learns that Gob has been cheating on Marta with the "legs" girl in his "saw-the-woman-in-half trick", and Rollo wants the girl who plays the legs. Michael tells Gob that Marta is a "treasure" and "a once-in-a-lifetime woman", a line which Gob then uses to prove his affection. After Michael realizes that Gob has stolen his watch, he decides to break up Gob and Marta's relationship by revealing Gob's affair with "the legs" to Marta. Having learned that the "head" and the "legs" talk about everything during the magic act, Michael secretly invites Marta to participate as the "head", so that she will learn about Gob's affair with the "legs". Michael also tells Rollo that he will get his "legs" back only if he allows Gob one last chance to get back into the Magician's Alliance, and Rollo agrees, giving him an act at the Gothic Castle. George Sr. takes a more pious path after being stuck in solitary confinement and discovering Judaism. Lucille brings Buster to prison so George Sr. can disapprove of him dating Lucille Austero, but he supports Buster instead.

The night of the magic show, Tobias has a mixup with his cab driver; instead of being taken to the "Gothic Castle," he is taken to the "Gothic Arsehole," dressed in his leather daddy outfit. Gob returns Michael's watch, vowing to become a better brother, which makes Michael regret his plan. The "legs" do not show, which leaves them in desperate need of female legs. When it is time for the "saw the lady in half" trick, Gob is pleasantly surprised to see Marta come on stage, and George Michael providing the "legs". After the show, Lucille realizes the importance of love to her children and decides to support Buster in his relationship with Lucille Austero. The two Lucilles become friendly, which freaks Buster out. Meanwhile, Michael watches as Gob and Marta reunite, and realizes that he will always be the good guy. The Magician's Alliance lets Gob back in, but he is then kicked out again. Tobias joins a singing barbershop group at the "Gothic Arsehole".

== Production ==
"Storming the Castle" was directed by Greg Mottola and written by co-producer Brad Copeland. It was Copeland's second writing credit for the series, and was the eighth episode of the ordered season to be filmed after the pilot.

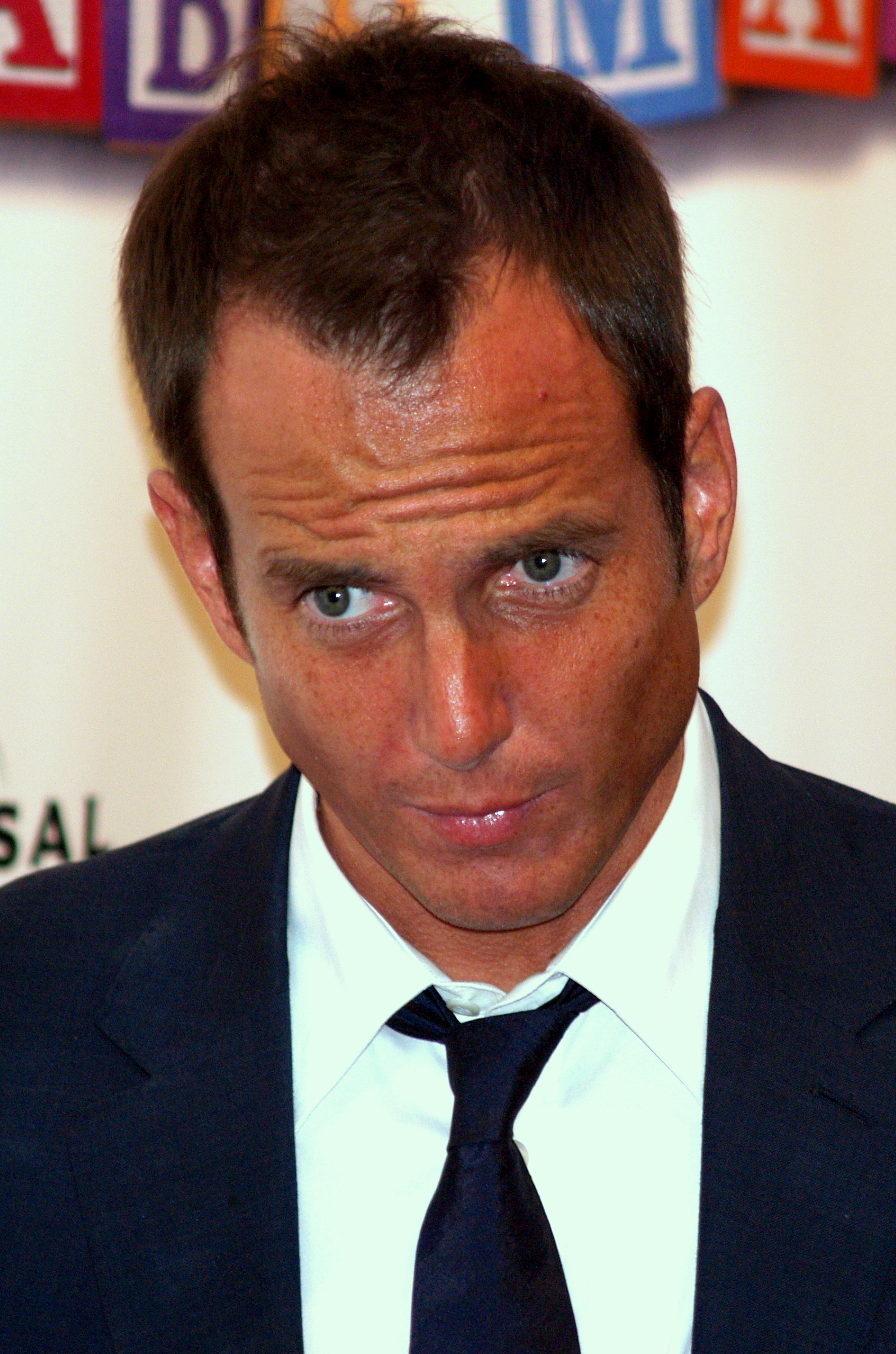
Will Arnett was not given specific details on what he would have to do for the magic show scene.

There was "a lot" of time dedicated to picking out the best song that could be used for Gob's theme during his magic shows, according to series creator Mitchell Hurwitz. The script for the episode called for "The Final Countdown" by Europe to be used, as suggested by writer Brad Copeland. However, Hurwitz had never heard of the song before, but it was still used. Similarity, despite Will Arnett having no previous experience with magic, the script vaguely stated "Gob does a magic show", without giving specifics on what the scene would entail. Hurwitz "rushed" onto the set to see if filming was going well, and saw Arnett holding a knife between his teeth, and realized he was "just fine". "Storming the Castle" was filmed in the middle of October, 2003, in California. The episode contains Liza Minnelli's fifth appearance on Arrested Development as Lucille Austero. The episode was first released on home video in the United States on October 19, 2004, in the Complete First Season DVD box set.

== Reception ==
=== Viewers ===
In the United States, the episode was watched by 5.72 million viewers on its original broadcast.

=== Critical reception ===
The A.V. Club writer Noel Murray stated "It’s fun to watch Michael in bad guy mode" in the episode. In 2019, Brian Tallerico from Vulture ranked the episode 44th out of the whole series.
