= Key Decisions =

- Arrested Development episode
- Gob sits in hospital, regretting his choice to promise Marta a life together
- Episode no.: Season 1 Episode 4
- Directed by: Anthony Russo
- Written by: Brad Copeland
- Cinematography by: James Hawkinson
- Editing by: Mark Scheib
- Production code: 1AJD04
- Original air date: November 23, 2003

Guest appearances
- Liza Minnelli as Lucille Austero; Leonor Varela as Marta; Clint Howard as Johnny Bark; John Beard as himself; Stacey Grenrock-Woods as Trisha Thoon

Episode chronology
← Previous "Bringing Up Buster"	Next → "Visiting Ours"
- Arrested Development season 1

"Key Decisions" is the fourth episode of the first season of the American television satirical sitcom Arrested Development. It was written by co-producer Brad Copeland and directed by producer Anthony Russo. It originally aired on Fox on November 23, 2003.

The series, narrated by Ron Howard, follows the Bluths, a formerly wealthy, dysfunctional family, who made their money from property development. The Bluth family consists of Michael (Jason Bateman), his twin sister Lindsay (Portia de Rossi), his older brother Gob (Will Arnett), his younger brother Buster (Tony Hale), their mother Lucille (Jessica Walter) and father George Sr. (Jeffrey Tambor), as well as Michael's son George Michael (Michael Cera), and Lindsay and her husband Tobias (David Cross) daughter Maeby (Alia Shawkat). In the episode, Michael begins to grow an interest for Gob's girlfriend, Marta, while Gob locks himself in his father's prison, promising to escape later in the week.

It was praised for being a strong start to the series, and was ranked by Vulture as the third best episode. It was seen in 3% of households of people between 18 and 49 in the United States, a 0.4% rise from the previous.

== Plot ==
Michael, the owner of a housing company, returns the family jet to get a new family car, which happens to be the jet's stair car. Lindsay, his sister, is upset by this and joins a tree activist named Johnny Bark and spends a night with him sitting on a tree near her house. Maeby, Lindsay’s contrary daughter, sees this and decides to campaign to have the tree cut down in an act of rebellion against her mother. George Michael, Michael’s child who has a crush on Maeby, seeing a chance to get closer to his cousin, joins her. The next day, Johnny follows her home and expresses his love for her. She rejects him, as the tree they were in last night is cut down.

Gob, a magician and brother of Michael, wants to perform a publicity stunt for his career and spend time with his father, George Sr., who got arrested, decides to go inside the Orange County prison and promises to escape later in the week. Before his arrival, Gob swallows a key, with some difficulty, but is unable to poo it out due to the lack of privacy in prison. In the courtyard, Gob is stabbed by an inmate called White Power Bill, and is sent to the hospital, fulfilling his promise to escape the prison. Gob is told by his doctor that the key prevented the shiv from stabbing his small intestine. Meanwhile, Michael reluctantly takes Gob's girlfriend, Marta, a soap-opera actress, to a television award show. There, Michael begins to grow a romantic interest in Marta.

The next day, the pair hear about what happened to Gob and rush to the hospital. Once there, Michael watches as Gob recommits to Marta and becomes upset. Buster, Michael’s brother who struggles socially, having gone to the award show without glasses, accidentally flirts with Lucille Austero. While visiting Gob at the hospital, Buster meets Lucille Austero once again. Learning about his accidental flirt and her interest for him, Buster suffers a panic attack, while Lucille Austero suffers a vertigo attack. Buster tells Lucille Austero that he wants to start dating, much to the dismay of his mother.

== Production ==
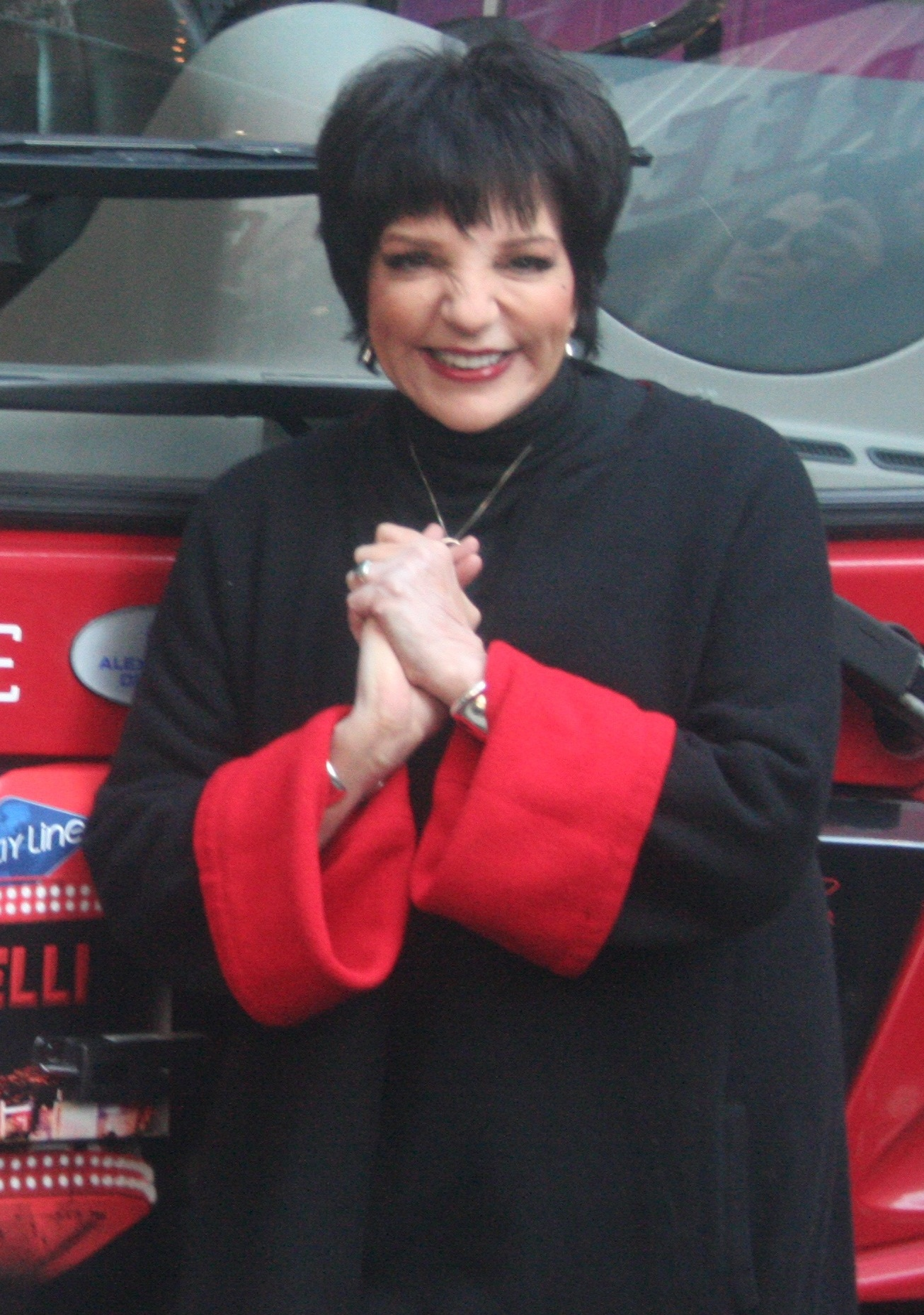
Liza Minnelli, who portrays Lucille Austero, in 2011

"Key Decisions" was directed by producer Anthony Russo and written by Brad Copeland. It was the fourth episode of the ordered season to be filmed after the pilot.

Liza Minnelli was cast in the role of Lucille Austero. Minnelli performed the scenes with her falls and stumbling from Lucille Austero's vertigo by herself, saying in her memoir "every fall I took on Arrested Development was performed by yours truly." The song that plays during some scenes with Michael and Marta is "You Here With Me", which was composed specifically for the show by David Schwartz, who composed all original music for the show. Clint Howard, who plays Johnny Bark, is the brother of Ron Howard, who narrates and produces the show. This was the second of only two episodes Leonor Varela appeared in as Marta, as she was recast as Patricia Velásquez due to Varela having a scheduling conflict with Voces Inocentes.

== Analysis ==
Robert Irwin, writing for Arrested Development and Philosophy: They've Made a Huge Mistake, evaluates Gob's behavior in this episode through the lens of Aristotelian virtue ethics, which propose a "golden mean" that can be achieved through avoiding behavioral extremes. Gob's actions in this episode are very extreme, and thus he fails to achieve this balance. For example, his attempt to escape prison by swallowing a key, only to realize he could not pass the key without privacy, is so overconfident that it later negatively impacts him. A similar situation arises when Gob promises Marta a future together, only to immediately regret it. Irwin says "his boastful nature has once again landed him in the position of admitting a ‘huge mistake‘''. Irwin also says that Gob's apparent admissions of guilt, saying that he's made a huge mistake, are not actually character development, as he never actually learns anything from the experience, despite him making the phrase his catchphrase over the series.

Elizabeth Lowry, writing a chapter for A State of Arrested Development, criticizes the episode for using an "environmentalists vs developers" trope, and framing Johnny Bark as an "odd and subversive" character, undermining environmentalism. The tree is used as a plot device, rather than anyone actually caring about it for non superficial reasons. Lowry says "Bark is interested in the tree only when he is not distracted by the thought of a relationship with Lindsay, Lindsay is interested in the tree only as a bid for attention, and Maeby is interested in the tree only when Lindsay is not."

== Reception ==
=== Viewers ===
In the United States, the episode aired on Fox on November 23, 2003, and was watched by 6.26 million viewers on its original broadcast. It received a 3.0 percent share among adults between the ages of 18 and 49, meaning that it was seen by 3.0% of all households in that demographic. This was a 0.4% rise in viewership from the previous episode, "Bringing Up Buster", which was seen by 2.6% of all households in the same range, and a return to the viewership share of "Top Banana".

=== Critical reception ===
In 2019, Brian Tallerico from Vulture ranked the episode as the third best of the whole series, saying the plot line in which Gob tries to escape prison is his "best-ever story line." The A.V. Club writer Noel Murray praised the episode's writing, stating that "It’s not just that this is an especially funny episode, with multiple strong storylines that barrel ahead fairly unpredictably. It’s that every single detail seems to have been thought through." Joe Reid from Decider praised the introduction of the character Lucille Austero, played by Liza Minnelli, stating that, "Minnelli was doing superb work, both verbally and with Lucille 2’s debilitating bouts of vertigo." Jim Halden from HowStuffWorks ranked the episode as the eight best of the series, praising the episode's focus on family dynamics, and also expressing admiration for the show's strong start, as he says "normally, sitcoms take a while... for the real laughs to begin," and "the fourth episode in season one, is proof of that [the show is starting strong]." In 2022, Looper writer Kristi Roe-Owen ranked episode as the 34th best of the series, which is just above average.

=== Aftermath ===
The phrase "I've made a huge mistake" debuted in this episode, and became a running joke and catchphrase from the show. It was even referenced in the title of the 2011 book Arrested Development and Philosophy: They've Made a Huge Mistake. Another notable running joke that originated in this episode was the stair car, which is driven throughout the series, becoming popular amongst fans and appearing in the marketing material for season five.
