= In God We Trust (Arrested Development) =

- Arrested Development episode
- Episode no.: Season 1 Episode 8
- Directed by: Joe Russo
- Written by: Abraham Higginbotham
- Cinematography by: James Hawkinson
- Editing by: Lee Haxall
- Production code: 1AJD06
- Original air date: December 14, 2003
- Running time: 22 minutes

Guest appearances
- Liza Minnelli as Lucille Austero; Patricia Velásquez as Marta Estrella; John Michael Higgins as Wayne Jarvis; Henry Winkler as Barry Zuckerkorn; B.W. Gonzalez as Lupe

Episode chronology
← Previous "My Mother, the Car"	Next → "Storming the Castle"
- Arrested Development season 1

"In God We Trust" is the eighth episode (Note: The episode is listed as the eighth episode of the season on the DVD collection, but originally aired as the seventh episode.) of the first season of the American television satirical sitcom Arrested Development. It was written by Abraham Higginbotham and directed by producer Joe Russo. It originally aired on Fox on December 14, 2003.

The series, narrated by Ron Howard, follows the Bluths, a formerly wealthy, dysfunctional family, who made their money from property development. The Bluth family consists of Michael, his twin sister Lindsay, his older brother Gob, his younger brother Buster, their mother Lucille and father George Sr., as well as Michael's son George Michael, and Lindsay and her husband Tobias' daughter Maeby. In the episode, George Sr. is to be released for an afternoon to take part in a pageant of living art representations, playing God in Michelangelo's The Creation of Adam. The role of Adam is sought by George Michael, Buster, and Tobias, who all have different motivations.

== Plot ==
Michael, Lindsay and Lucille have a meeting with the family's longtime attorney, Barry Zuckerkorn, to discuss George Sr.'s incarceration. Barry arranges for the court to release George Sr. for an afternoon so he can participate in the "Living Classics" pageant. The Bluths have always been a part of Michelangelo's The Creation of Adam, although Buster is reluctant to play the part of Adam this year, since he already has plans with Lucille Austero. Tobias, still looking to further his acting career, offers to take the part, but Lucille wants Buster to do it. Michael is determined to drop Barry as family attorney for the very businesslike Wayne Jarvis. After the meeting breaks up, Lucille mentions to Lindsay that Michael called her a "stay-in-bed mom" in order to dissolve their burgeoning friendship. Maeby, feeling ignored by her parents, decides to teach them a lesson.

Michael learns Spanish to impress Marta, and Buster gets George Michael to take over as Adam. Lindsay and Michael realize that their mother is playing them against each other. Lindsay tells him that her marital difficulties are partly because Tobias is a never-nude who always wears a pair of cut-off jeans, and Michael confesses his love for Marta. Tobias asks George Michael if he can play Adam, and George Michael agrees, but says he will give him the suit later, as he is wearing it. Tobias misunderstands this to mean that George Michael is also a never-nude, and Michael arranges a meeting with Wayne Jarvis. Michael and Lindsay get further evidence that their mother is trying to make them angry with each other and decide to teach her a lesson. When they find out that Barry is taking Lucille to the Living Classics pageant, they realize how embarrassed she would be if George Sr. found out. Meanwhile, Maeby tries to get her parents' attention by printing out a fake airline ticket to Portugal. While neither Lindsay nor Tobias see the ticket, Gob does, which confirms his suspicions that Michael is planning to flee the country after learning Spanish. George Michael, who is back to playing Adam, gets nervous when he realizes that playing Adam means wearing a tiny foam genitalia.

George Sr. gets his 24 hours of freedom as the pageant begins, while Michael and Lindsay arrive and find Lucille with Wayne, not Barry. Meanwhile, Lucille is surprised to see Buster with her rival Lucille Austero, and George Michael causes a scandal by appearing as Adam while wearing a pair of cut-off jeans over his costume. Dressed as God, George Sr. tries to escape from the pageant, and Michael chases him while Gob (on his segway) chases Michael, leading to all three knocking each other to the ground. When George Sr. finds out Lucille is on a date, he tries to run back to the pageant but is tasered by a prison guard. The Bluths spend Christmas Eve together at the prison, where Michael is forced to rely on Barry. Lucille and Maeby decide that they should spend more time together, and Michael and Lindsay tentatively affirm their allegiance.

== Production ==
"In God We Trust" was directed by producer Joe Russo and written by Abraham Higginbotham. It was Russo's third directing credit and Higginbotham's first writing credit. It was the sixth episode of the ordered season to be filmed after the pilot.

== Reception ==
=== Viewers ===
In the United States, the episode was watched by 6.11 million viewers on its original broadcast.

=== Critical reception ===
The A.V. Club writer Noel Murray praised the episode, likening it to his favorite episodes of It’s Always Sunny in Philadelphia. In 2019, Brian Tallerico from Vulture ranked the episode 30th out of the whole series.
