= Bringing Up Buster =

- Arrested Development episode
- Michael burns himself on the Cornballer, which was created from a metajoke by series creator Mitchell Hurwitz.
- Episode no.: Season 1 Episode 3
- Directed by: Joe Russo
- Written by: Mitchell Hurwitz; Richard Rosenstock
- Cinematography by: James Hawkinson
- Editing by: Lee Haxall
- Production code: 1AJD02
- Original air date: November 16, 2003
- Running time: 22 minutes

Guest appearances
- Leonor Varela as Marta; Richard Simmons as himself; Justin Grant Wade as Steve Holt

Episode chronology
← Previous "Top Banana"	Next → "Key Decisions"
- Arrested Development season 1

"Bringing Up Buster" is the third episode of the first season of the American television satirical sitcom Arrested Development. It was written by series creator Mitchell Hurwitz and consulting producer Richard Rosenstock, and directed by producer Joe Russo. It originally aired on the Fox Network on November 16, 2003.

The series, narrated by Ron Howard, follows the Bluths, a formerly wealthy, dysfunctional family, who made their money from property development. In the episode, Michael (Jason Bateman) is forced by Lucille (Jessica Walter) to spend a day with Buster (Tony Hale). Meanwhile, George Michael (Michael Cera) auditions for a school play to get closer to Maeby (Alia Shawkat), who wants to get closer to jock Steve Holt (Justin Grant Wade).

Hale did not actually swear during the bleeped scene where Buster has a swearing fit, instead reciting the alphabet. The episode explores themes of homosexuality, incest, and child-parent relationships. It was rated highly among critics.

== Plot ==
In the mid-70s, George Sr., a leader of a housing company that eventually got arrested, attempted to market a cornball maker called the "Cornballer", but was unsuccessful, as the machine was made illegal all over the world after multiple people burned themselves while using the device. The Cornballer, however, became popular in Mexico. In the present, Michael, George Sr.’s son, is making cornballs and asks his son George Michael, his son, to join him. George Michael tells him he is too busy to be making cornballs and going on bike rides with his dad, and Michael spends some of the episode trying to bond with son.

Maeby, George Michael’s cousin and crush, auditions for a play at her school, wanting to get closer to her crush, Steve Holt, who also auditioned. George Michael, wanting to get closer to Maeby, also auditions, but became an understudy for Steve Holt. Tobias, Maeby’s father, thinking Maeby auditioned so she could be an actress like him, talks to the school and becomes the new stage director, resulting in Maeby quitting the play. After a conversation with Michael, Tobias begins to suspect, incorrectly, that George Michael has a crush on Steve Holt, which later results in George Michael quitting the play, only to learn Maeby joined the play once again. At the end of the day, George Michael watches as Maeby kisses Steve Holt, unaware Maeby did not enjoy the kiss.

Gob, a magician, has been kicked out of his girlfriend Marta's house after a fight, and Lucille, Michael’s mother, allows him to stay at the model home the family has been living in, against Michael's wishes. Because the family funds are frozen, Buster, Lucielle’s favorite child who has a hard time socially, has to cancel his yearly summer studies and stays at home with his mother, Lucille. She becomes annoyed by his presence and begs Michael to spend time with him. Michael reluctantly agrees and spends the entire day with Buster, who goes on a profanity ridden rant on his mother, earning respect from his siblings. Buster and Michael go on a bike ride Michael intended to have with his sun. Buster neglects to install brakes whilst building the bike, and crashes. Buster returns to Lucille, and Michael and George Michael spend the rest of the day making cornballs on the Cornballer.

== Production ==
"Bringing Up Buster" was directed by Joe Russo, and written by series creator Mitchell Hurwitz and consulting producer Richard Rosenstock.

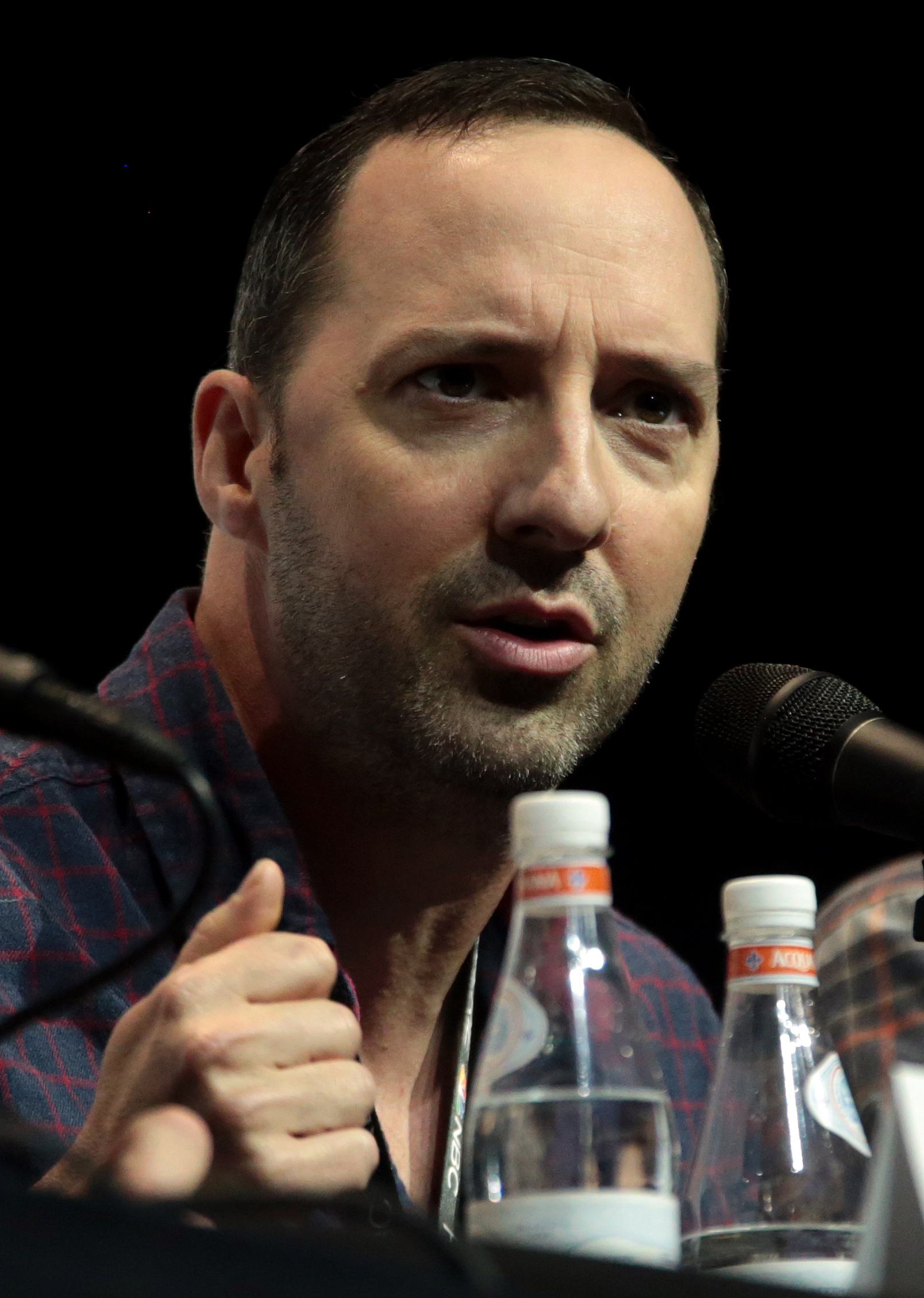
Tony Hale, who portrays Buster, in 2018

It was the second episode of the ordered season to be filmed after the pilot. Justin Grant Wade, who plays Steve Holt, got the job despite only saying two words in audition. During Buster's swearing rant, his speech is bleeped for a prolonged period of time. Tony Hale, who portrays Buster, claims that he "[screamed] out the alphabet" to make it look like he was actually swearing. He later joked that he only has "three solid words [in his] cuss vocabulary". Dean Lorey called Hale one of the "nicest guys in showbusiness," and said that he refused to swear. Hale praised the episode for introducing further background information on Buster, calling it "great" in that aspect. This was the first of only two episodes Leonor Varela appeared in as Marta, as she was recast as Patricia Velásquez due to Varela having a scheduling conflict with Voces Inocentes.

The Cornballer was a metajoke from series creator Mitchell Hurwitz. Hurwitz said he knew the episode would "end with a father-son rapprochement", and originally wanted to include the phrase "That's a little cornball". The phrase, which was inspired from slang used in "old Broadway", also came from Hurwitz's time on The John Larroquette Show, a period he described as "obnoxious". The prop of the invention used in the episode was made out of parts of a deep fryer and an aquarium, according to Hurwitz.

== Themes and analysis ==
Olivia Armstrong of Decider likened Steve Holt's repeated shouting of his own name to similar behavior often exhibited in a Pokémon character. "Bringing Up Buster" has been cited as an example of George Sr.'s greed and sole interest in profitability, creating items as "worthless" as The Cornballer and shamelessly selling them to the consumer.

A Shakespearean play is performed in this episode, and it mirrors certain tropes of said plays, with men playing female roles; this was organised by Tobias, and is another hint at his implied homosexuality. The episode also continues the established theme of incest, with George Michael continuing his crush on his cousin Maeby, and with Maeby first being shown to have attraction toward Steve Holt, who is later revealed to be her cousin. The episode explores themes of 'clingy' parent-child relationships; Lucille and Buster, and Michael and George Michael, and whilst Michael spends much of the episode trying to force a close relationship with his son, upon seeing how unhealthy Lucille and Buster's relationship is, he realizes that he should not force his son into spending time with him.

This episode uses the show’s documentary style format to its advantage, with its use of bleeping making Buster’s swearing scene more immersive. Darci Doll, writing a chapter for the book Arrested Development and Philosophy: They’ve Made a Huge Mistake, claims that Tobias referring to Steve Holt as ‘she’ is not actually a manifestation of his homosexuality, rather that he simply sees that the gender of the character someone is playing, in this case Steve Holt playing Beatrice, is more relevant than their actual gender in theater.

== Release and reception ==
=== Release ===
The episode released on Fox on November 16, 2003. In the United States, the episode was watched by 5.78 million viewers on its original broadcast. It received a 2.6 percent share among adults between the ages of 18 and 49, meaning that it was seen by 2.6% of all households in that demographic. This was a 0.4% drop in viewership from the previous episode, "Top Banana", which was seen by 3.0% of all households in the same range. An article in the Irish Independent from the Friday after this episode aired noted that whilst the show and episode were popular with critics, audiences were largely indifferent.

=== Critical response ===
The A.V. Club writer Noel Murray praised the episode’s family dynamics, with the main theme of overbearing parents. Murrary also praised the episode's use of its documentary format to provide visual jokes, with camera zooms revealing people in a room that weren't originally known to be there. Olivia Armstrong from Decider praised the simplicity of the episode, in contrast to future episodes which often "become a bit convoluted." Her favourite moment was Buster’s fit of swearing, an opinion shared by Steve Greene from IndieWire, who ranked the episode as the seventh best of the series. The article ranks highly on other lists of the best Arrested Development episodes, with Brian Tallerico from Vulture ranking the episode as the twelfth best of the series, and Jim Halden from HowStuffWorks ranking it first. They praised the episode for introducing many future running jokes, such as the cornballer, Steve Holt shouting his own name and Buster’s yawning.

=== Aftermath ===
Hale later screened the episode in 2014 at the Ruby Diamond Concert Hall, to open his talk entitled "Hey Brother! An Evening with Buster Bluth featuring Tony Hale". The Cornballer would become a reoccurring gag for the series, notably reappearing in "The One Where They Build a House" and "Good Grief".
