= Visiting Ours =

- Arrested Development episode
- Lucille (right), in shock after Michael (left) asks her to have a conjugal visit with George Sr.
- Episode no.: Season 1 Episode 5
- Directed by: Greg Mottola
- Written by: John Levenstein; Richard Rosenstock
- Cinematography by: James Hawkinson
- Editing by: Steven Sprung
- Production code: 1AJD03
- Original air date: December 7, 2003
- Running time: 22 minutes

Guest appearances
- Bob Odenkirk as Dr. Phil Gunty; Judy Greer as Kitty

Episode chronology
← Previous "Key Decisions"	Next → "Charity Drive"
- Arrested Development season 1

"Visiting Ours" is the fifth (Note: The episode is listed as the fifth episode of the season in the DVD box set, but originally aired as the sixth.) episode of the first season of the American television satirical sitcom Arrested Development. It was written by co-executive producer John Levenstein and consulting producer Richard Rosenstock, and directed by Greg Mottola. It originally aired on the Fox Network on December 7, 2003.

The series, narrated by Ron Howard, follows the Bluths, a formerly wealthy, dysfunctional family, who made their money from property development. In the episode, Michael, needing information from George Sr. secretary Kitty, attempts to use her attraction to Gob to obtain it. Meanwhile, Tobias and Lindsay attend couples therapy, and George Michael attempts to conquer his fear of visiting his grandfather in prison, but ends up further reinstating it.

The cut-off shorts that Tobias sports were chosen by costume designer Katie Sparks, who specifically purchased shorts meant for women to add another layer to the joke. "Visiting Ours" received generally positive reviews from critics, with Odenkirk's scenes alongside Cross being considered a highlight. Since airing, the episode has received thematic analysis from both scholars and critics.

== Plot ==
Michael Bluth visits his imprisoned father George Sr., and asks about suspicious bookkeeping, but George Sr. is preoccupied with a softball game. At work, Michael asks his secretary—and George Sr.'s former mistress—Kitty about the bookkeeping, but she refuses to answer. Then, Michael's brother Gob comes in, revealing that he is writing a strongly-worded letter to the prison's warden, after, for a magic-related publicity stunt, Gob checked into the prison, but was stabbed by an inmate, and the warden refused to acknowledge the trick as legitimate. Michael notices tension between Gob and Kitty, and asks Gob to get the needed information.

Michael's sister Lindsay and her husband Tobias prepare for a therapy session together, which Lindsay is reluctant to attend. Their daughter Maeby and Michael's son George Michael follow them to find out where they are going, and George Michael lies about visiting George Sr. in prison before, despite being afraid. Looking to overcome this, George Michael asks Michael to bring him to the prison. At the therapy session, Tobias and Lindsay argue, and the therapist roleplays with Tobias, upsetting Lindsay, who is tired of Tobias' acting career. After witnessing a murder, George Sr. lashes out at George Michael. To cheer up his son, Michael leaves George Michael in the car while he talks to George Sr., who confesses that he wants sex. Michael assumes George Sr. wants his wife Lucille.

Michael tells this to Lucille, who is confused why her son is asking, but agrees. Gob reveals to Michael that he had sex with Kitty, but neglected to get the bookkeeping information Michael asked for. Michael checks with his father in the conjugal trailer, but realizes that George Sr. assumed he would be having sex with Kitty. On the basis that George Sr. would give him the information, a repulsed Michael distracts Kitty with Gob, who is at the prison, delivering his letter. Gob tries to sneak away, but the warden finds his letter, and detains him against a trailer window, in which George Sr. and Lucille are having sex, forcing Gob to watch. George Michael tells Michael that he is worried he might go to prison some day, but Michael assures him that only guilty people like George Sr. are imprisoned, comforting George Michael.

== Production ==
"Visiting Ours" was directed by Greg Mottola, and written by co-executive producer John Levenstein and consulting producer Richard Rosenstock. It was Rosenstock's second writing credit for the series, and was the third episode of the ordered season to be filmed after the pilot.

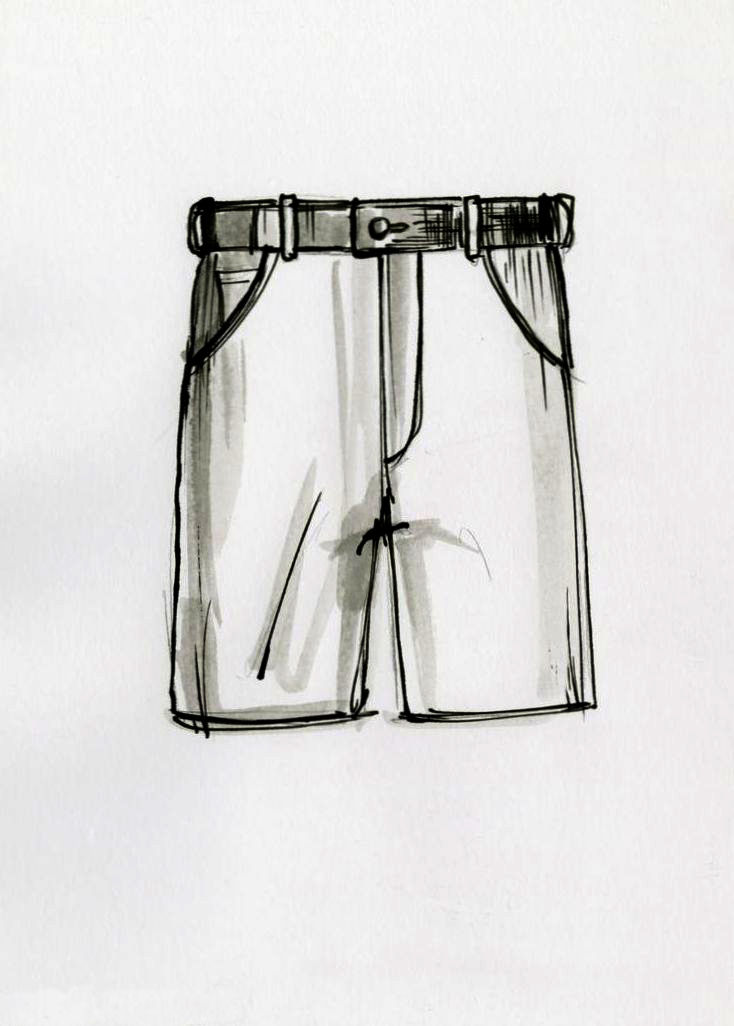
Tobias' cut-off shorts (illustration pictured) were chosen by costume designer Katie Sparks.

Bob Odenkirk, a friend of David Cross, appeared in the episode as Lindsay and Tobias' marriage counselor. Odenkirk and Cross previously collaborated together on the series Mr. Show with Bob and David. Although the shorts had appeared before, the episode contains the first official acknowledgment of Tobias' "never nude" condition, which causes him to always feel the need to be wearing cut-off shorts and never be fully nude.

The shorts were chosen by costume designer Katie Sparks, who was shopping at Neiman Marcus when she saw a pair of women's cut-offs—the fact they were intended for women added another layer to the joke—and so they were chosen for the series. "Visiting Ours" was first released on home video in the United States on October 19, 2004, in the Complete First Season DVD box set. In 2013, a soundtrack compiling every song from the first four seasons of the series entitled "At Long Last...Music and Songs From Arrested Development" was released, including the medley "Tobias Eat Pray Gay" from the episode.

== Themes and analysis ==
The use of Tobias' cut-off shorts in the episode has been likened to the use of clothing to distinguish sexuality in television programs akin to Arrested Development. His fear of being naked, which is similar to the real condition of gymnophobia, according to author Navid Sabet, and reliance on the "non-heteronormative" cut-off shorts are early indicators for the series that Tobias' struggle with his sexuality is more complicated than most would assume. After Lindsay questions him on the cut-off shorts, he quickly runs into the closet, and his immediate reaction implies that the shorts have caused tension in their marriage before, adding an extra comedic layer to the gag.

In a society of "established sexual norms", George Michael's crush on his cousin Maeby is unusual, and his struggle with it is a common theme of the series. Similar to Tobias, George Michael's confusion regarding his sexuality parallels Tobias', although George Michael's is without the homosexual element. This is seen when he tries to act like someone different from his true self throughout the episode—something Tobias does frequently—and pretends like he isn't afraid of visiting George Sr. in prison, despite being terrified at the very notion. Gob's decision to live as a "bum" will often lead him to showcase his signature dishonest side, causing him to lie to people to get his way, as seen when he agrees to seduce Kitty just so Michael will let him continue to support him, maintaining his role as the family's "mooch".

The episode reiterates the common theme of the series that charitable acts are not too far off from criminal activity, as first seen in "Pilot". Author Kristin Distel notes this with George Sr.'s admission that he committed "light treason", foreshadowing his later-revealed involvement in building model homes for Iraq; he does the Iraqis a favor by building them the homes—his charitable act—and is condemned for it by the United States government—tying the act to criminal activity. Like other faucets of pop culture, "Visiting Ours" shows how television programs often tackle conjugal visits and makes "prison-related" jokes, such as Gob being forced to watch his parents have sex. Scholar Matthew Dugandzic compares the "light treason" line to the concept of a "grave sin", and how any sin that fits in that category would be considered consequential, no matter the severity of it, and so George Sr. calling his treason—a severe crime—"light" is a comedic juxtaposition of this.

== Reception ==
=== Viewers ===
In the United States, the episode was watched by 6.31 million viewers during its original broadcast on December 7, 2003. It marked a decrease in viewership from the previously aired episode, "Charity Drive", which drew in 6.77 million viewers.

=== Critical reception ===
Liam Gaughan of Collider hailed Odenkirk's performance as therapist Phil Gunther as one of his best roles, praising it's parallels to Cross and Odenkirk's work on Mr. Show with Bob and David and the "heartfelt" one-liners exchanged by Tobias and Phil during the sessions. The A.V. Club writer Noel Murray felt the episode was largely disconnected from both the rest of the series and itself, taking time to do scenes with Lindsay and Tobias at therapy that don't affect the plot. However, Murray felt disconnected scenes such as this were comedic enough to work in its favor instead. He praised George Michael's short sub-plot about being scared of visiting prison, writing that the ending scene between him and Michael was a "touching moment".

Megan Walsh of Screen Rant ranked the episode as one of the top ten best of the series, praising Greer's work as Kitty and Gob's failing of his tasks, which she described as "hilarious". In 2019, Brian Tallerico from Vulture ranked the episode as the 18th best of the whole series, writing that the reunion of Odenkirk and Cross guaranteed the episode a high placement, but also highlighted two lines from George Sr.—one where he confesses to committing "light treason", and when he tells his son, "Daddy horny, Michael".
