= Pier Pressure (Arrested Development) =

- Arrested Development episode
- Episode no.: Season 1 Episode 10
- Directed by: Joe Russo
- Written by: Jim Vallely; Mitchell Hurwitz
- Cinematography by: James Hawkinson; Greg Harrington (uncredited)
- Editing by: Steven Sprung
- Production code: 1AJD09
- Original air date: January 11, 2004
- Running time: 22 minutes

Guest appearances
- Liza Minnelli as Lucille Austero; Steve Ryan as J. Walter Weatherman

Episode chronology
← Previous "Storming the Castle"	Next → "Public Relations"
- Arrested Development season 1

"Pier Pressure" is the tenth episode of the first season of the American television satirical sitcom Arrested Development. Written by consulting producer Jim Vallely and series creator Mitchell Hurwitz, and directed by producer Joe Russo, it originally aired on the Fox Network on January 11, 2004. The episode is Hurwitz's joint-favorite episode with "Making a Stand", and it received mostly positive reviews from critics.

The series, narrated by Ron Howard, follows the Bluths, a formerly wealthy, dysfunctional family, who made their money from property development. The Bluth family consists of Michael, his twin sister Lindsay, his older brother Gob, his younger brother Buster, their mother Lucille and father George Sr., as well as Michael's son George Michael, and Lindsay and her husband Tobias' daughter Maeby. In the episode, Michael thinks George Michael has started using marijuana, but Buster asked George Michael for it to treat Lucille Austero's vertigo. Maeby spends time with grandmother Lucille, but Lindsay resents their bond.

== Plot ==
Michael is disappointed with George Michael's latest test grade of A-minus, while Lindsay is impressed with Maeby's C-minus because she did not even study. Michael and Lindsay remember how George Sr. used a one-armed former employee named J. Walter Weatherman to scare his children into learning life lessons. Lucille asks Michael and Lindsay to help her doctor receipts before handing them in to the SEC, to which they both decline, with Maeby being forced to help as punishment. Michael overhears George Michael berate himself as he struggles with a math problem and tells him to take some time off. At the banana stand, Buster tells George Michael that Lucille Austero's vertigo is acting up and asks to obtain some marijuana for her. Michael finds his son working and chides him for not taking time off, giving him $20 to spend on himself. Buster then gives George Michael $225 to buy the marijuana.

Lucille gives a brooch that Lindsay always wanted to Maeby, who is excited to make her mother jealous but bothered by a remark Lucille makes about her freckles. George Michael does not find Gob on the yacht and leaves a note asking if he can buy him some marijuana. Gob does, but tells Michael, who quizzes George Michael. Michael visits George Sr. to get the contact information of J. Walter Weatherman to teach George Michael a lesson, but George Sr. tells Michael he should just talk to his son. With Gob's help, Michael hires some "Hot Cops" (strippers in policeman costumes) to stage a fake drug bust. Lindsay finds out that her daughter got the brooch she always wanted, but when Lucille begins to criticize Maeby, she decides she has spent enough time with her grandmother.

George Michael heads for the yacht to pick up the marijuana, and Gob flashes the lights, leading two men to appear with a bag of marijuana and George Michael to complete the deal. The "Hot Cops" appear but start dancing around, and Michael appears and tells George Michael a lesson has been instilled. Buster comes forward and admits that the marijuana was for him, not George Michael. Two real drug dealers, having seen Gob's light flashing, come forward with a supply of marijuana. Before Gob can explain, a police boat appears. The dealers, thinking they were set up, pull out their guns, and Michael and Gob become trapped in a gun battle. One of the dealers loses an arm, but it is revealed that the man is J. Walter Weatherman, who says George Sr. was teaching him a lesson: not to teach lessons. Maeby gives Lindsay the brooch. Michael encourages George Michael to be honest with him, but when he admits that he has a crush on Maeby, Michael reacts with denial.

== Production ==
"Pier Pressure" was directed by producer Joe Russo and written by consulting producer Jim Vallely and series creator Mitchell Hurwitz. It was Russo's fourth directing credit, Vallely's first writing credit and Hurwitz's fourth writing credit. It was the ninth episode of the ordered season to be filmed after the pilot.

== Reception ==
=== Viewers ===
In the United States, the episode was watched by 7.21 million viewers on its original broadcast, an increase of over 1 million viewers from the previous episode.

=== Critical reception ===
The episode garnered positive reviews. In 2019, Brian Tallerico from Vulture ranked "Pier Pressure" as the best episode out of the whole series. In 2015, The A.V. Club ranked it as the fifth best episode of all time from any sitcom since 1990. The A.V. Club writer Noel Murray praised the episode, saying "Arrested Development kicked off 2004 in impressive fashion with “Storming The Castle,” and then cemented its place as the best sitcom on the air with ["Pier Pressure"]." In 2015, Megan Walsh from Screen Rant ranked the episode as one of the top ten best of the series. Series creator Mitchell Hurwitz ranked "Pier Pressure" as his joint-favorite episode of the show with "Making a Stand".

=== Accolades ===
At the 57th Writers Guild of America Awards, Mitchell Hurwitz and Jim Vallely won Best Episodic Comedy for "Pier Pressure".
