= Staff Infection =

- Arrested Development episode
- Episode no.: Season 1 Episode 15
- Directed by: John Fortenberry
- Written by: Brad Copeland
- Cinematography by: Greg Harrington
- Editing by: Robert Bramwell
- Production code: 1AJD14
- Original air date: March 14, 2004
- Running time: 22 minutes

Guest appearances
- James Lipton as Warden Stefan Gentles; Justin Lee as Annyong Bluth; B.W. Gonzalez as Lupe

Episode chronology
← Previous "Shock and Aww"	Next → "Missing Kitty"
- Arrested Development season 1

"Staff Infection" is the fifteenth episode of the first season of the American television satirical sitcom Arrested Development. It was written by co-producer Brad Copeland and directed by John Fortenberry. It originally aired on Fox on March 14, 2004.

The series, narrated by Ron Howard, follows the Bluths, a formerly wealthy, dysfunctional family, who made their money from property development. The Bluth family consists of Michael, his twin sister Lindsay, his older brother Gob, his younger brother Buster, their mother Lucille and father George Sr., Michael's son George Michael, and Lindsay and her husband Tobias' daughter Maeby. In the episode, Michael discovers that the family had all been on the company payroll for doing nothing, so he forces them to work. Gob and Buster join a construction crew. Lindsay becomes Michael's receptionist. Annyong works at the banana stand. Tobias joins George Sr.'s prison to research an acting role.

== Plot ==
Michael (Jason Bateman) receives an emergency call from Lucille, who is prepping Annyong to work at the banana stand and tells Michael she needs money, and has not received her latest paycheck from the Bluth Company. Michael announces that the unearned paychecks will end, making Buster come to the office to help out. Lindsay awakes to find the house deserted, as Tobias has gone to the prison to research his new movie role of "Frightened Inmate #2". Lindsay goes to the Bluth Company office to inquire about her missing paycheck, but Michael says she must work for it, assigning her to answer the phones while Kitty is gone. Lindsay begins criticizing Michael's management style, while Buster struggles with his responsibilities in the copy room.

George Michael and Maeby work at the banana stand, and she teases him about his father choosing work over him. Tobias arranges with the new prison warden, Stefan Gentles, to share a cell with George Sr., while Michael takes Buster to a construction site. George Sr. sells Tobias's bunking location to another inmate for a pack of cigarettes. Gob arrives to ask Michael why he has not received his paycheck, but Michael puts him to work. Lindsay has the fluorescent lights replaced with softer lighting at the office and offers to take the staff out for lunch. The employees board the wrong bus, and are taken to a ferry for Catalina Island, where they spend the rest of the day wandering around. Annyong arrives at the banana stand for his first day of work, and Maeby convinces George Michael to take some time off, so he heads to the office to find his father.

Michael stops by the banana stand to find George Michael. At the construction site, Gob convinces the workers to strike, but Buster, who is enjoying the work, disagrees. The other workers convince the brothers to settle their disagreement with a game of "chicken" using bulldozers. Lindsay finds out about the work stoppage just as George Michael arrives and puts him in charge. Michael discovers the solution to a zoning problem by building a sand castle at the beach. George Michael finds a file in his father's desk containing his school work, including some primary school art projects. He finally has proof that his father loves him as federal investigators enter the office they thought was empty. Their cover is blown, so they grab the file with the schoolwork and run out. Michael arrives at the work site to tell everyone he is changing the building plan. Lucille arrives with her car full of shopping bags. Michael throws a party, and he and George Michael finally spend some time together.

== Production ==
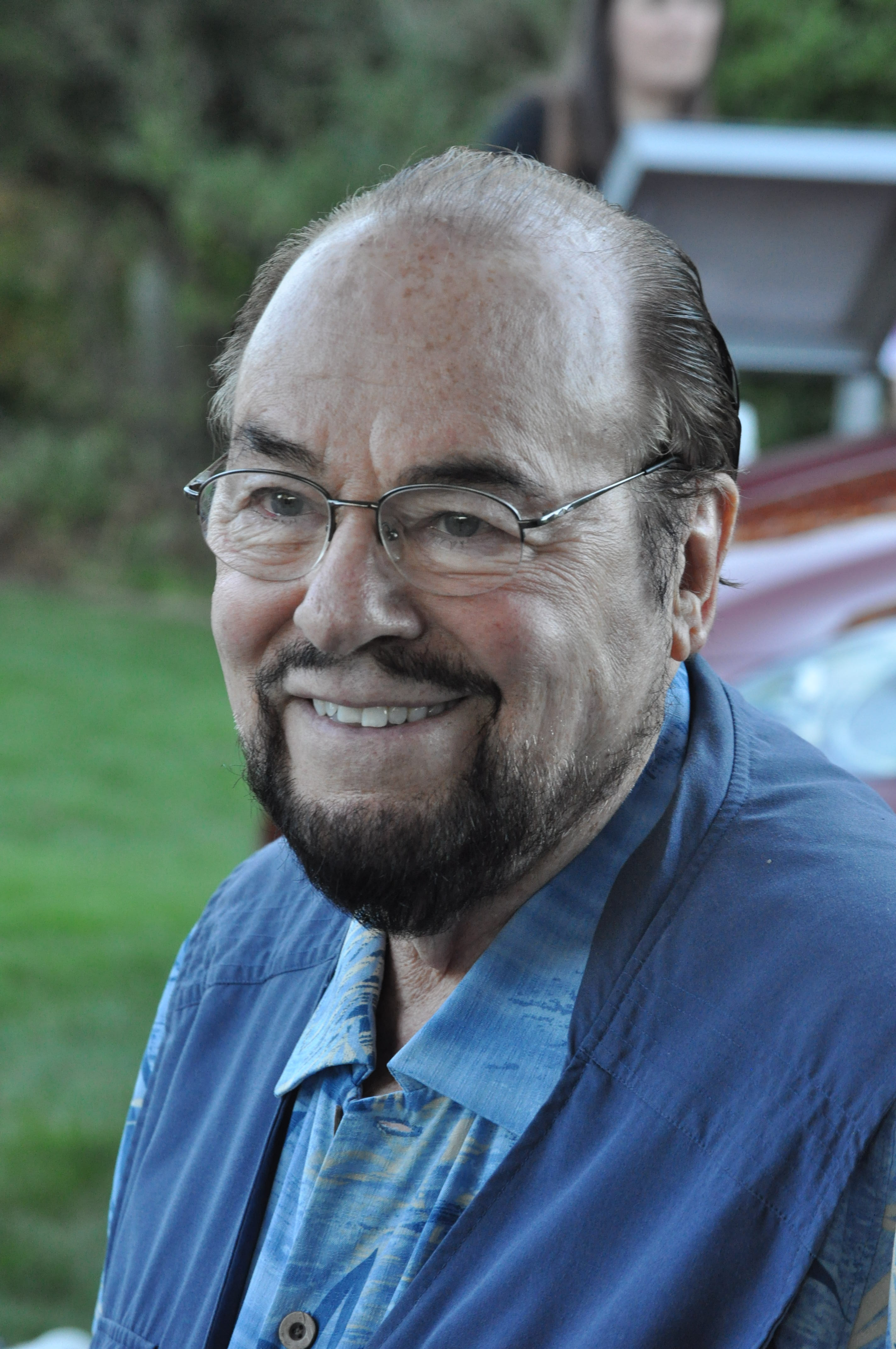
James Lipton makes his series debut in "Staff Infection".

"Staff Infection" was directed by John Fortenberry and written by co-producer Brad Copeland. It was Copeland's third writing credit, and was the fourteenth episode of the season to be filmed after the pilot.

The episode contains the first appearance of Gob's chicken dance, which he uses to taunt Buster. The script simply read "Gob does his chicken dance", which confused Will Arnett, who did not know what it meant. He met with series creator Mitchell Hurwitz and executive producer Jim Vallely, who demonstrated chicken dances of their own, before Arnett joined in to try himself. It was meant to be a "really taunting dance", but Arnett changed it to be more masculine and "macho", hoping to make it more threatening.

It also houses the first appearance of James Lipton on Arrested Development. When Lipton was sitting in his trailer, he was informed that "everyone" on the set was worried he would get confrontational with David Cross, who had previously mocked Lipton on both his show, Mr. Show with Bob and David, and in his stand-up comedy. Later, following a "timid" knock on the trailer door, Cross walked in, informing Lipton that everyone was excited to work with him. Lipton replied, "Good", and the two remained silent, waiting for the other to reply to no avail. Eventually, the two got over the tension, and Lipton stated that Cross was "marvelous" to work with; near the end of filming, a stagehand asked Cross about his upcoming comedy album, to which Lipton jokingly asked if he was on it. Despite the joking nature of the question, everyone on set "turned to ice", assuring Lipton that he wouldn't be mocked by Cross again.

== Reception ==
=== Viewers ===
In the United States, the episode was watched by 5.37 million viewers on its original broadcast, a decrease of almost 1 million viewers from the previous episode, "Shock and Aww".

=== Critical reception ===
The A.V. Club writer Noel Murray wrote that the episode "doesn’t entirely work," but "there’s still a lot of intricacy and well-sprung jokes in". In 2019, Brian Tallerico from Vulture ranked the episode as the 17th best of the whole series.
