= My Mother, the Car =

- Arrested Development episode
- A bandaged Michael calling Gob
- Episode no.: Season 1 Episode 7
- Directed by: Jay Chandrasekhar
- Written by: Chuck Martin
- Cinematography by: James Hawkinson
- Editing by: Steven Sprung
- Production code: 1AJD07
- Original air date: December 21, 2003
- Running time: 22 minutes

Guest appearances
- Liza Minnelli as Lucille Austero; Patricia Velásquez as Marta Estrella

Episode chronology
← Previous "Charity Drive"	Next → "In God We Trust"
- Arrested Development season 1

"My Mother, the Car" is the seventh episode of the first season of the American television satirical sitcom Arrested Development. It was written by supervising producer Chuck Martin and directed by Jay Chandrasekhar. It originally aired on Fox on December 21, 2003.

The series, narrated by Ron Howard, follows the Bluths, a formerly wealthy, dysfunctional family, who made their money from property development. The Bluth family consists of Michael (Jason Bateman), his twin sister Lindsay (Portia de Rossi), his older brother Gob (Will Arnett), his younger brother Buster (Tony Hale), their mother Lucille (Jessica Walter) and father George Sr. (Jeffrey Tambor), as well as Michael's son George Michael (Michael Cera), and Lindsay and her husband Tobias's (David Cross) daughter Maeby (Alia Shawkat). In the episode, Lucille feels unloved by her children and attempts to pin her car accident on an amnesiac Michael. Buster begins a relationship with Lucille Austero, and Lindsay is unpleasantly surprised when she finally visits her father in prison.

== Plot ==
Michael, fed up with his mother Lucille's extravagant spending, says she cannot throw a lavish birthday party for herself. But when Lindsay, prompted by Lucille, suggests a surprise party, Michael agrees on the condition that Lindsay visit George Sr. in prison. At the prison, no one notices Lindsay, so she goes shopping for an outfit to wear for the next day's visit. Meanwhile, George Michael starts to overcome his crush on Maeby as they sneak into an R-rated movie, but a trailer plays for a French movie about a love between two cousins called Les Cousins Dangereux, which reignites his crush, so he decides to get a fake ID from Gob so he and Maeby can see the movie.

Michael drives Lucille to her surprise party, but nobody else shows up. Lucille is hurt, so Michael arranges a second surprise party, insisting that all his siblings be there. When no one shows up for that one either, Michael and Lucille bond, both feeling unappreciated by their family. Feeling sorry for her, Michael lets Lucille drive, even though her license has been revoked for multiple accidents and reckless driving. When Lucille sees a man riding a segway, she assumes it is Gob and decides to "give him a scare." Lucille crashes the car and drags an unconscious Michael into the driver's seat so that she will not be blamed. Michael had hit his head on the giant rock Buster left in the backseat and suffers short-term memory loss. Worried that Michael will regain his memory of the accident, Lucille insists that he recover in her apartment and bribes their family doctor to give him fentanyl, which Lucille says is children's aspirin.

Next door, Buster, who is secretly dating Lucille Austero, also gets injured when, from Austero's balcony, he spies his mother on her own balcony and jumps through the window to get out of sight. Meanwhile, George Michael tells Gob about Michael's accident while asking for the fake IDs, and Gob decides to take the family yacht to South America for the summer. George Michael and Maeby attempt to watch Les Cousins Dangereux while Buster and Lucille Austero also try to watch it. Lindsay continues to visit George Sr. in prison and grows increasingly frustrated that none of the inmates take note of her sexy outfits. On her third visit, George Sr. begs her to stop, revealing that he has been paying off the inmates with gold Krugerrands to behave in Lindsay's presence, but her repeated visits are bankrupting him. Michael remembers seeing "Gob" on the road and trying to scare him, but still thinks that he was the one behind the wheel, believing his motivation was because of his affection for Marta. Feeling guilty, he calls his brother and tells him he can live on the yacht. Gob realizes that Michael has been duped by Lucille and cancels his escape plans. With Gob's help, Michael remembers the truth, and they confront Lucille, who admits her guilt and says that she was afraid of losing Michael's newfound respect and admiration.

== Production ==
Patricia Velásquez, here pictured in 2026, portrays Marta for the first time in the series, replacing the otherwise occupied Leonor Varela.

"My Mother, the Car" was directed by Jay Chandrasekhar and written by supervising producer Chuck Martin. The episode is listed as the seventh episode of the season on the DVD collection, but originally aired as the eighth episode. Deleted scenes appeared exclusively on the DVD release.

The episode was filmed sometime in early-mid October, 2003, and contains Liza Minnelli's fourth appearance on Arrested Development as Lucille Austero. While filming a scene in a jail cell on October 26, Jason Bateman, suited with a bandage, was interviewed by SFGate's Hugh Hart. He discussed the episode's narrative at that point, and revealed he was waiting for Minelli to finish shooting her cameo scene before he would shoot his own scene. This was the first episode that Patricia Velásquez appeared in as Marta, as she was originally portrayed by Leonor Varela, but was recast due to Varela having a scheduling conflict with Voces Inocentes. The episode's title references the 1960s NBC sitcom My Mother the Car, which revolves around a mother becoming reincarnated as a car. "My Mother, the Car" was first released on home video in the United States on October 19, 2004, in the Complete First Season DVD box set.

== Themes and analysis ==
Author Judy Kutulas notes that the episode's humor revolves heavily around having a bad mother, and the audience's takeaway of it depends on their own view of motherhood; the episode does not focus on potentially alienating certain viewers and instead develops unconventional inclusivity for poorly-mannered mothers, something the majority of sitcoms do not do. It also explores the taboo topic of sexuality in prison settings through the scenes of Lindsay flirting with the inmates while wearing scandalous outfits. It showcases how barbaric prisoners will get when being deprived of sex for so long, having to take bribes from George Sr. just to not sexually assault Lindsay; and, by having them not go through with the harassment, challenges the notion that prisoners are inherently dangerous, being able to control themselves in tempting situations.

A chapter of the book A State of Arrested Development notes that the episode's titular reference to a fairly niche, short lived sitcom is a representation of how the show generates humor, using deeply thought out and interwoven jokes to generate humor, rather than the standard episodic format. Arrested Development and Philosophy: They've Made a Huge Mistake observes that Michael is completely justified to believe he was responsible for the crash, as he only has his mothers fabricated account to go off, saying that he is operating under a false justified belief. The book also mentions the imbalance of Michael's repeated kind acts towards Lucille never being reciprocated, showing a toxic mother son relationship.

== Reception ==
=== Viewers ===
In the United States, the episode released on December 21, 2003, and was watched by 6.42 million viewers on its original broadcast, making it the 74th most watched broadcast of the week, behind Threat Matrix by 0.05 million, and ahead of America's Most Wanted by 0.14. It achieved a 2.9 audience share among the 18-49 age demographic, the highest share of any Arrested Development episode to that point since the pilot.

=== Critical reception ===
The episode was considered somewhat mediocre by critics, at least in comparison to previous episodes. The A.V. Club writer Noel Murray called the episode "something of an oddity for Arrested Development", in terms of it not being as funny as prior episodes, but says it's "funny enough". He complained that the subplot with Lindsay trying to garner attention from male inmates seemed "off-model". Despite his complaints, he did praise Gob's role in the episode, saying that "GOB's kind of the MVP of 'My Mother, the Car'." In 2019, Brian Tallerico from Vulture ranked the episode 33rd out of the whole series, calling it the "first Arrested Development episode that isn't utterly fantastic", whilst praising Jessica Walter's performance as Lucille. Chad Collins of /Film was another who praised Walter's performance, calling her "the show's best asset". Collins chose the episode as one of the ten most underrated episodes of the series.

=== Aftermath ===
This episode saw the first appearances of a few running jokes, notably Lindsay's "SLUT" t-shirt (reappears in "Good Grief" and "The Immaculate Election") and the movie Les Cousins Dangereux (reappears in "Righteous Brothers").
