= Let 'Em Eat Cake (Arrested Development) =

- Arrested Development episode
- Episode no.: Season 1 Episode 22
- Directed by: Paul Feig
- Written by: Mitchell Hurwitz; Jim Vallely
- Cinematography by: Greg Harrington
- Editing by: Steven Sprung
- Production code: 1AJD21
- Original air date: June 6, 2004
- Running time: 22 minutes

Guest appearances
- Henry Winkler as Barry Zuckerkorn; Ian Roberts as Literal Doctor; Justin Lee as Annyong Bluth; Alessandra Torresani as Ann Veal; Judy Greer as Kitty Sanchez; John Beard as himself; Stacey Grenrock-Woods as Trisha Thoon

Episode chronology
← Previous "Not Without My Daughter"	Next → "The One Where Michael Leaves"
- Arrested Development season 1

"Let 'Em Eat Cake" is the twenty-second and final episode of the first season of the American television satirical sitcom Arrested Development. It was written by series creator Mitchell Hurwitz and consulting producer Jim Vallely, and directed by Paul Feig. It originally aired on Fox on June 6, 2004.

The series, narrated by Ron Howard, follows the Bluths, a formerly wealthy, dysfunctional family, who made their money from property development. The Bluth family consists of Michael, his twin sister Lindsay, his older brother Gob, his younger brother Buster, their mother Lucille and father George Sr., Michael's son George Michael, and Lindsay and her husband Tobias' daughter Maeby. In the episode, Michael and George Sr. prepare for a polygraph test on the company's business dealings. Kitty attempts to blackmail the company with information against George Sr. George Michael gets a new girlfriend, Ann. Maeby is jealous. Lindsay and Tobias enjoy new success when a book Tobias had written years earlier gains an audience. George Sr. escapes from prison.

== Plot ==
Because of the low-carb diet fad, which all the Bluths are on, the banana stand has been struggling, while the model home is falling apart because of shoddy workmanship. Lindsay comes to Michael for money to start a new bead business. Gob hears Lindsay say "bee" business and vows to start his own. Michael reluctantly agrees to help her out. Kitty Sanchez calls and threatens to bring the company down unless they meet her demands. George Sr. tells Michael to give Kitty whatever she wants but avoid finding out what she knows so Michael can pass his upcoming polygraph test. Buster and Annyong bet with each other to see who can get a girlfriend first. At the banana stand, George Michael makes a new friend, Ann, to Maeby's disgust.

Michael meets with Kitty, who demands control of the Bluth Company and tells him that George Sr. built houses overseas without paying taxes. Michael decides that paying the back taxes is easier than dealing with Kitty and returns home just as George Michael is leaving to meet Ann. In the kitchen, Lindsay and Tobias excitedly announce that The Man Inside Me, a book Tobias had written years earlier, has suddenly brought in an influx of money, so Lindsay abandons her bead business. Michael realizes that the model homes are identical to the American-made homes built in Iraq on the news. Kitty and Gob scheme to take over the Bluth Company, while Lucille claims no knowledge about the Iraqi deal. Tobias does a book reading; Lindsay arrives and sees the book is popular with a gay clientele.

Michael argues with his father at the prison when he realizes his mother knew about the Iraqi deal and quits the company. Kitty moves on to Buster. With Michael gone, George Sr. volunteers to take the polygraph and suffers a heart attack as the test gets underway. Everyone but Michael gathers at the hospital. At the model home, Michael plans to leave town with his son, but George Michael says he wants to stay for the family's sake. Maeby kisses Annyong to make George Michael jealous, but George Michael does not see. Michael announces that he will never leave the family, and a doctor tells the family they have "lost" George Sr. Shocked, the family goes in to see the body and discovers an empty bed, realizing George Sr. has escaped. Michael reverses course again and tells George Michael they are leaving. The family comes to terms with George Sr.'s disappearances while carb-loading.

== Production ==
"Let 'Em Eat Cake" was directed by Paul Feig, and written by series creator Mitchell Hurwitz and consulting producer Jim Vallely. It was Feig's second directing credit, Hurwitz's eighth writing credit and Vallely's fifth writing credit. It was the twentieth-first and final episode of the season to be filmed after the pilot, and the ninth and final of Fox's second episode order for the season.

== Reception ==
=== Viewers ===
In the United States, the episode was watched by 5.08 million viewers on its original broadcast.

=== Critical reception ===
The A.V. Club writer Noel Murray praised the episode, saying "the episode is probably best-remembered as the one where the Arrested Development staff threw in a bunch of jokes about the low-carb Atkins diet fad." In 2019, Brian Tallerico from Vulture ranked the episode as the 16th best of the whole series.

=== Accolades ===
Steven Sprung was nominated for Outstanding Single-Camera Picture Editing for a Comedy Series at the 57th Primetime Emmy Awards and Best Edited Half-Hour Series for Television at the 2005 American Cinema Editors Award for "Let 'Em Eat Cake".
