= Charity Drive =

- Arrested Development episode
- Michael (right) drives a scared Helen (left), mistaking her for Lupe.
- Episode no.: Season 1 Episode 6
- Directed by: Greg Mottola
- Written by: Barbie Feldman Adler
- Cinematography by: James Hawkinson
- Editing by: Mark Scheib
- Production code: 1AJD05
- Original air date: November 30, 2003
- Running time: 22 minutes

Guest appearances
- Liza Minnelli as Lucille Austero; Judy Greer as Kitty; B.W. Gonzalez as Lupe; Mel Gorham as Helen

Episode chronology
← Previous "Visiting Ours"	Next → "My Mother, the Car"
- Arrested Development season 1

"Charity Drive" is the sixth (Note: The episode is listed as the sixth episode of the season in the DVD box set, but originally aired as the fifth.) episode of the first season of the American television satirical sitcom Arrested Development. It was written by series producer Barbie Feldman Adler, and directed by Greg Mottola. It originally aired on the Fox Network in the United States on November 30, 2003, to an audience of 6.77 million viewers.

The series, narrated by Ron Howard, follows the Bluths, a formerly wealthy, dysfunctional family, who made their money from property development. In the episode, Michael attempts to track down who is using his father's car, and finds out the Bluth Company has not filed some of their permits. Meanwhile, Lindsay tries to prove herself to be more charitable than Michael, leading the latter to accidentally kidnap a Mexican woman. Concurrently, Buster is torn between his mother, Lucille, and lover, Lucille Austero, when mixed in with the pressure of being forced to bid on his mother at a charity auction, and being expected to give the latter Lucille a grand romantic gesture.

The episode contains the second appearance of Liza Minnelli as Lucille Austero, who was intended to only appear in "Charity Drive" and "Key Decisions", but was brought on for a reoccurring role. The line about the $10 banana was inspired by a joke dating back to the writer's room of The Golden Girls. Since airing, "Charity Drive" has received positive reception from critics, with praise going towards its humor and writing; it has also been labeled as one of the series' best episodes. Critics and scholars have analyzed the episode's themes since its release.

== Plot ==
In an extreme heatwave, Michael Bluth begins biking to work. After a poor investors meeting, Michael's assistant Kitty tells him that his family has been using their father George Sr.'s car. Upset, Michael speaks with his brother Gob, who lies about driving it. He then speaks with his sister Lindsay, who reveals she has volunteered to "dry" the wetlands. He bumps into his mother Lucille, who divulges that she plans on having her son Buster bid on her at a charity auction, trying to keep him away from her rival, and Buster's new girlfriend, Lucille Austero. Buster gives the car keys to Michael, who finds it trashed.

He drives to prison to speak with George Sr., inquiring about permits the company did not file. He instructs Michael to forcibly swap the files with a fake, telling him to make Gob do it. Michael and Gob reconcile, and, after hearing his father requested his help, Gob agrees to the plan, but not before forcing Michael to make his son George Michael agree to do whatever Gob wants. Lindsay joins a group of activists for the wetlands, and calls Michael to boast about how much more charitable she is compared to him. Accepting her challenge, Michael picks up a woman at the bus stop, Helen, believing she is Lucille's housekeeper Lupe, and drives her around. When she sees the messy car, Helen assumes Michael is planning to kill her, and she flees to the wetlands, confusing Michael. Lucille Austero visits the Bluth residence, not finding Buster, who she assumed was planning a romantic gesture for her, leaving her disappointed.

Gob fails to swap the files, and instructs George Michael and his niece Maeby to break into the permit office and finish the task. At the office, George Michael and Maeby are caught, but he promises to take the blame, and is subsequently imprisoned. At the auction, Buster arrives late, accidentally bidding $10,000 on Lucille Austero, having heard the word Lucille being called and assuming they were referring to his mother. Lindsay also arrives at the auction, and Michael, feeling sympathetic that no one is bidding on her, bids $1,000. After leaving the auction, Michael is arrested for Helen's kidnapping, and meets with George Michael in a police car.

== Production ==
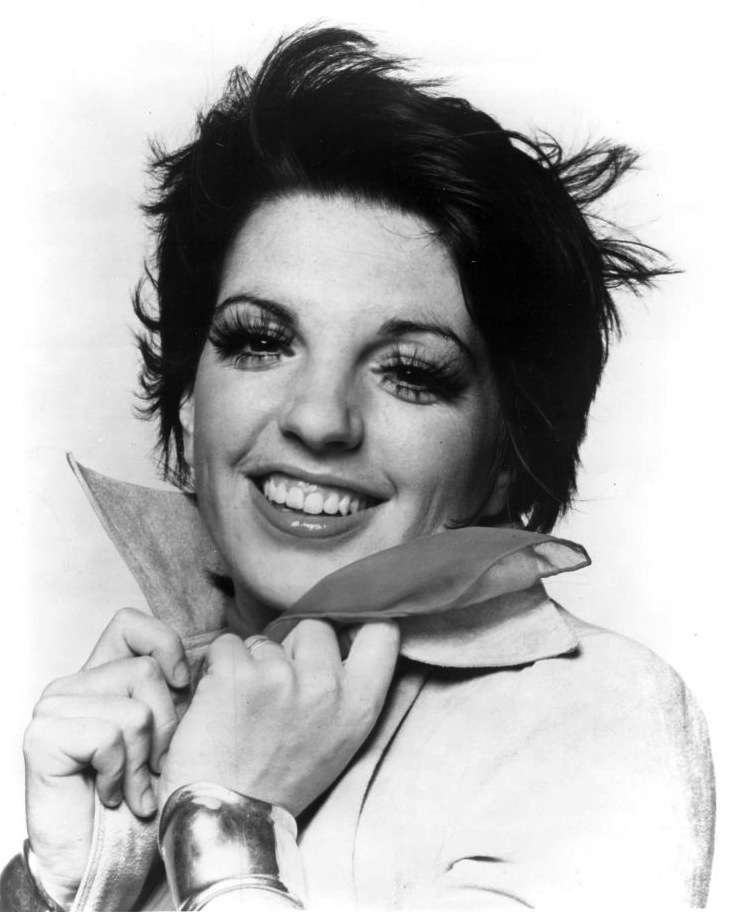
Originally, Minnelli was only supposed to appear in two episodes—this, and the previous—but was given a larger role because of her character's popularity.

"Charity Drive" was directed by Greg Mottola, and written by series producer Barbie Feldman Adler. It was Feldman Adler's first writing credit for the series, and was the fifth episode of the ordered season to be filmed.

"Charity Drive" was filmed from September 26 to 29, 2003, in Los Angeles. The episode contains Liza Minnelli's second appearance on Arrested Development as Lucille Austero. Lucille's line, "It's one banana, Michael, what could it cost, 10 dollars?" was written with any of the series' characters in mind, but was ultimately given to Lucille, as it felt much more natural for her to say than any other. It was conceived from a joke stemming from outside of the writer's room, revolving around a rich television executive assuming a loaf of bread would cost $20. Specifically, co-executive producer Jim Vallely traced the origins of the joke to a joke made at the expense of his executives during his time writing for The Golden Girls. Judy Greer guest stars in the episode as George Sr.'s secretary, Kitty. Originally, Minnelli was only supposed to appear in two episodes, "Key Decisions" and "Charity Drive". However, her performance in the two were so lauded by both critics and viewers that she was signed on for several more episodes, eventually being upgraded to a recurring character. "Charity Drive" was first released on home video in the United States on October 19, 2004, in the Complete First Season DVD box set.

== Themes and analysis ==
Author Kristin Barton found "Charity Drive" to be representative of how Lucille commonly exhibits manipulative behavior as dishonesty is a common tactic for her, such as when she strategically tries to get things her way by manipulating Buster and Lucille Austero's love life. It has been compared to the season two episode "Burning Love", as both contain narratives focusing around a charity auction, and both use similar farces to create comedy. Gob's Mr. Bananagrabber character is an example of his creativity and ability to design coherent business models, according to Vincent Terrace. However, his incompetence often gets in the way, as seen when he foolishly gives animation rights of the character to Michael, who uses it to his financial advantage. Author Jamie Watson and Robert Arp use the episode to start a dialogue about whether or not politically incorrect comments are immoral; when Lucille is speaking with her housekeeper, she makes xenophobic comments about her Hispanic background and her apparent illegal presence in the country, which Michael calls her out on. By claiming she is an illegal immigrant, Lucille is also admitting to employing one, which Michael ignores. Watson and Arp claim that this shows how our perception of socially unacceptable and legally unacceptable acts can be warped.

== Reception ==
=== Viewers ===
In the United States, the episode was watched by 6.77 million viewers on its original broadcast on the Fox Network. It received a 3.1 percent share among adults between the ages of 18 and 49, meaning that it was seen by 3.1% of all households in that demographic. It marked an increase in viewership from the previously aired episode, "Key Decisions", which drew in 6.26 million viewers.

=== Critical reception ===
The A.V. Club writer Noel Murray praised the episode's writing, but found fault with its various plot lines that ended up feeling "scattered". Murray preferred the episode's smaller moments of humor rather than anything done spectacularly, specifically enjoying gags revolving around George Sr. Rachel Brodsky of The Independent listed Lucille's estimate of a banana's cost being $10 as one of her favorite lines from Lucille in the series, particularly for further lamenting how out of touch her character can be.

In 2019, Brian Tallerico from Vulture ranked the episode as the eleventh best of the whole series, noting Kitty's first appearance, along with Buster's bidding of Lucille Austero and Michael's kidnapping, as the highlights. He goes on to say he is surprised to find that he did not ultimately place it in the top ten. Despite asserting that season one was already consistently good by the time the episode aired, Saloni Gajjar of The A.V. Club felt "Charity Drive" was still a highlight; Gajjar wrote that it delivered "non-stop" with its comedy, even with ideas that could come off cringey—such as Gob whistling after losing a tooth—but are still humorous. Gajjar also praises Hale, Minnelli, and Walter for enhancing the "strangely compelling" plot revolving around Buster and the two Lucille's.

=== Legacy ===
Lucille's $10 banana line has become a "beloved" meme since "Charity Drive"'s airing, often used to mock wealthy people who appear out of touch in their assessments of how much an item can cost.
