= Arrested Development season 1 =

Season of television series

Arrested Development
- Season 1
- Season 1 DVD cover art
- Starring: Jason Bateman; Portia de Rossi; Will Arnett; Michael Cera; Alia Shawkat; Tony Hale; David Cross; Jeffrey Tambor; Jessica Walter
- No. of episodes: 22

Release
- Original network: Fox
- Original release: November 2, 2003 – June 6, 2004

Season chronology
- Next → Season 2

The first season of Arrested Development, an American satirical sitcom created by Mitchell Hurwitz, premiered on Fox in the United States on November 2, 2003, and concluded June 6, 2004. It consists of 22 episodes, each running about 22 minutes.

The first season was released on DVD in region 1 on October 19, 2004, in region 2 on March 21, 2005, and in region 4 on February 23, 2005. The show's storyline centers on the Bluth family, a formerly wealthy, habitually dysfunctional family, and is presented in a continuous format, incorporating hand-held camera work, narration, archival photos and historical footage.

== Production ==
=== Development ===
Discussion that led to the creation of the series began in the summer of 2002. Ron Howard had the original idea to create a comedy series in the style of handheld cameras and reality television, but with an elaborate, highly comical script resulting from repeated rewritings and rehearsals. Howard met with David Nevins, the president of Imagine Television, Katie O'Connell, a senior vice president, and two writers, including Mitchell Hurwitz. In light of recent corporate accounting scandals, such as Enron and Adelphia, Hurwitz suggested a story about a "riches to rags" family. Howard and Imagine were interested in using this idea, and signed Hurwitz to write the show. The idea was pitched and sold in Q3 2002. There was a bidding war for the show between Fox and NBC, with the show ultimately selling to Fox as a put pilot with a six-figure penalty.

Over the next few months, Hurwitz developed the characters and plot for the series. The script of the pilot episode was submitted in January 2003 and filmed in March 2003. It was submitted in late April to Fox and was added to the network's fall schedule that May. After the pilot, Fox ordered twelve more episodes for the first half of the season, with an additional nine later ordered.

=== Casting ===
Alia Shawkat was the first cast in the series. Michael Cera, Tony Hale, and Jessica Walter were cast from video tapes and flown in to audition for Fox. Jason Bateman and Portia de Rossi both read and auditioned for the network and were immediately chosen. The character of Gob was the most challenging to cast. When Will Arnett auditioned, he played the character "like a guy who thought of himself as the chosen son, even though it was obvious to everyone else that he was the least favorite"; he was chosen immediately for his portrayal. The characters of Tobias and George Sr. were originally going to have minor roles, but David Cross and Jeffrey Tambor's portrayals mixed well with the rest of the characters, and they were given more significant parts. Howard provided the narration for the initial pilot, and his narrating meshed so well with the tone of the program that the decision was made to keep his voice. Howard aided in the casting of "Lucille 2"; the producers told him that their dream actress for the role was Liza Minnelli but that they assumed no one of her stature would take the part. She agreed when Ron Howard asked her himself, because they were old friends; she had been his babysitter when she was a teenager.

== Cast ==
- Jason Bateman as Michael Bluth
- Portia de Rossi as Lindsay Bluth Fünke
- Will Arnett as Gob Bluth
- Michael Cera as George Michael Bluth
- Alia Shawkat as Maeby Fünke
- Tony Hale as Buster Bluth
- David Cross as Tobias Fünke
- Jeffrey Tambor as George Bluth, Sr. / Oscar Bluth
- Jessica Walter as Lucille Bluth
- Ron Howard as Narrator (uncredited)

== Episodes ==
The episode list below is ordered the same as on the season 1 DVD collection and not in their original broadcast order.

No. overall	No. in season	Title	Directed by	Written by	Original release date	Prod. code	US viewers (millions)
1	1	"Pilot"	Anthony Russo & Joe Russo	Mitchell Hurwitz	November 2, 2003	1AJD79	7.98
Michael anticipates becoming the new president of his father's homebuilding company, having put up with his family for years to achieve it. Instead, the position is given to his mother, Lucille–just before his father George Sr. is arrested by the SEC. When his family proves unable to run the company, Michael reluctantly returns to help. Meanwhile, Gob's magic career is derailed and George Michael develops a crush on his cousin Maeby.
2	2	"Top Banana"	Anthony Russo	Mitchell Hurwitz and John Levenstein	November 9, 2003	1AJD01	6.70
The banana stand has burned down and flashbacks reveal the events that led to its destruction: Michael tries to get George Sr. to let him run the company himself. Maeby joins George Michael working at the banana stand, where she steals money from the till. George Michael sets it on fire, with Michael's permission. They do not realise that it is not insured due to Gob not mailing a letter to the insurance company and Michael is informed by George Sr. that there was $250,000 within the walls of the stand. Michael builds a new stand out of wood. Tobias auditions for a commercial but the role is given to Lindsay instead.
3	3	"Bringing Up Buster"	Joe Russo	Mitchell Hurwitz and Richard Rosenstock	November 16, 2003	1AJD02	5.78
Lucille grows annoyed with Buster and forces Michael to take him to work for a day. Meanwhile, George Michael auditions for the school play in an attempt to kiss Maeby, but Tobias' ineptitude as a director ruins his chances.
4	4	"Key Decisions"	Anthony Russo	Brad Copeland	November 23, 2003	1AJD04	6.26
Gob attempts to break out of prison in a publicity stunt to further his magic career. While Gob is locked up, Michael agrees to accompany Gob's girlfriend Marta to an awards show, where he begins to fall for her. Meanwhile, Lindsay attempts to save an old tree from being demolished by the Bluth Company.
5	5	"Visiting Ours"	Greg Mottola	John Levenstein and Richard Rosenstock	December 7, 2003	1AJD03	6.31
Needing information from George Sr.'s secretary Kitty, Michael attempts to use her crush on Gob to get it. Meanwhile, Tobias and Lindsay attend couples therapy and George Michael attempts to conquer his fear of visiting George Sr. in prison.
6	6	"Charity Drive"	Greg Mottola	Barbie Feldman Adler	November 30, 2003	1AJD05	6.77
Lucille and Buster prepare for a charity bachelorette auction. Meanwhile, Michael and Lindsay try to prove to each other that they are not selfish, and Gob convinces George Michael to break into the permit office.
7	7	"My Mother, the Car"	Jay Chandrasekhar	Chuck Martin	December 21, 2003	1AJD07	6.42
Lucille feels unloved by her children and attempts to pin her car accident on an amnesiac Michael. Buster begins a relationship with Lucille Austero, and Lindsay is unpleasantly surprised when she finally visits her father in prison.
8	8	"In God We Trust"	Joe Russo	Abraham Higginbotham	December 14, 2003	1AJD06	6.11
George Sr. is to be released for an afternoon to take part in a pageant of living art representations, playing God in Michelangelo's The Creation of Adam. The role of Adam is sought by George Michael, Buster, and Tobias, who all have different motivations. Family lawyer Barry Zuckerkorn (Henry Winkler) makes his first appearance.
9	9	"Storming the Castle"	Greg Mottola	Brad Copeland	January 4, 2004	1AJD08	5.72
After Lindsay says that Michael is too much of a "good guy" to make a move on Marta, he devises a plan to have Marta meet Gob's second lover during his magic act. George Sr. discovers Judaism.
10	10	"Pier Pressure"	Joe Russo	Jim Vallely & Mitchell Hurwitz	January 11, 2004	1AJD09	7.21
Michael thinks George Michael has started using marijuana, but Buster asked George Michael for it to treat Lucille Austero's vertigo. Maeby spends time with grandmother Lucille, but Lindsay resents their bond.
11	11	"Public Relations"	Lee Shallat Chemel	Courtney Lilly	January 25, 2004	1AJD10	6.37
After a series of negative publicity, Michael hires a female publicist for the family, but she turns against them when he decides they should not date in the interest of George Michael.
12	12	"Marta Complex"	Joe Russo	John Levenstein & Jim Vallely	February 8, 2004	1AJD11	4.89
On Valentine's Day, Marta begins to fall for Michael, to his and Gob's misunderstanding. George Michael investigates his cousin's parentage for validation of his crush. Buster moves out of his mother's apartment. Lindsay wants a divorce from Tobias.
13	13	"Beef Consommé"	Jay Chandrasekhar	Chuck Martin & Richard Rosenstock	February 15, 2004	1AJD12	5.21
The family must appear at George Sr.'s arraignment hearing, but proceedings are jeopardized by Michael and Marta's relationship guilt and Gob's hunt for his unknown rival for Marta.
14	14	"Shock and Aww"	Joe Russo	Jim Vallely & Chuck Martin	March 7, 2004	1AJD13	6.42
Michael moves on to George Michael's ethics teacher (guest star Heather Graham), before realizing he and his son share an attraction to her. Lucille's newly adopted Korean son, Annyong, arrives.
15	15	"Staff Infection"	John Fortenberry	Brad Copeland	March 14, 2004	1AJD14	5.37
Michael discovers that the family had all been on the company payroll for doing nothing, so he forces them to work. Gob and Buster join a construction crew. Lindsay becomes Michael's receptionist. Annyong works at the banana stand. Tobias joins George Sr.'s prison to research an acting role.
16	16	"Missing Kitty"	Joe Russo	Mitchell Hurwitz & John Levenstein	March 28, 2004	1AJD15	5.51
Michael and George Sr. argue over the firing of Kitty, Michael's assistant and George's mistress. Gob announces his intentions to sink the company yacht in a magic act on the beach, inspiring George Michael's admiration.
17	17	"Altar Egos"	Jay Chandrasekhar	Barbie Feldman Adler	March 17, 2004	1AJD16	9.62
Michael has a deceitful one-night stand with Maggie (guest star Julia Louis-Dreyfus), a blind prosecutor who is arguing against his father. Gob marries a woman (Will Arnett's then-wife Amy Poehler) he has just met. Meanwhile, George Sr. uses an undercover FBI agent who has fallen for him for information on the case.
18	18	"Justice Is Blind"	Jay Chandrasekhar	Abraham Higginbotham	March 21, 2004	1AJD17	7.02
George Sr. wants Gob to sneak into Maggie's house for evidence, but he instead sends Tobias, who breaks in while Maggie is still home, hoping to sneak around her. Michael finds out her seeing-eye dog is blind, so Maggie must have been able to see all this time. George Michael confronts Maeby for posing as a terminally ill twin sister Surely.
19	19	"Best Man for the Gob"	Lee Shallat Chemel	Mitchell Hurwitz & Richard Rosenstock	April 4, 2004	1AJD18	5.51
Michael offers to plan Gob a bachelor party after his drunken wedding appears to have stuck. Gob refuses, saying George Sr. is his best man, so Michael tries to plan a fishing trip with George Michael for the same weekend. George Sr. plans to use the party in an elaborate attempt to scare an accountant out of testifying against him. Tobias tries to convince Lindsay to re-form a pharmaceutical-jingle-based family band.
20	20	"Whistler's Mother"	Paul Feig	John Levenstein & Jim Vallely	April 11, 2004	1AJD19	5.39
The family each beg Michael for money when the company funds become unfrozen. George Sr.'s twin brother Oscar shows up to attempt an affair with Lucille, and Michael makes a bad business deal with him. Lindsay protests the Iraq War after her stylist is deployed.
21	21	"Not Without My Daughter"	Lee Shallat Chemel	Mitchell Hurwitz & Richard Rosenstock	April 25, 2004	1AJD20	5.66
Michael breaks with tradition and takes his niece Maeby to Take Your Daughter to Work Day, but he partly regrets this when he is questioned by police investigating Kitty's disappearance. Lindsay, embarrassed to be working at a clothing store, claims that she is shoplifting. This becomes a personal challenge for magician Gob.
22	22	"Let 'Em Eat Cake"	Paul Feig	Mitchell Hurwitz & Jim Vallely	June 6, 2004	1AJD21	5.08
Michael and George Sr. prepare for a polygraph test on the company's business dealings. Kitty attempts to blackmail the company with information against George Sr. George Michael gets a new girlfriend, Ann. Maeby is jealous. Lindsay and Tobias enjoy new success when a book Tobias had written years earlier gains an audience. George Sr. escapes from prison.

== Reception ==
=== Critical reception ===
In its first season, Arrested Development was met with widespread critical acclaim. On Rotten Tomatoes, the season has an approval rating of 100% with an average score of 10 out of 10 based on 24 reviews. The website's critical consensus reads, "Arrested Development puts an ambitiously complex, brilliantly fast-paced spin on dysfunctional family comedy, anchored by the efforts of a tremendously talented ensemble." On the review aggregator website Metacritic, the first season scored 89 out of 100, based on 24 reviews, indicating "Universal acclaim".

=== Awards and nominations ===
In 2004, the first season received seven Emmy Award nominations, and earned five wins: Outstanding Comedy Series, Outstanding Directing and Writing for a Comedy Series for the pilot episode written by Mitchell Hurwitz and directed by brothers Anthony and Joe Russo, Outstanding Casting for a Comedy Series, and Outstanding Single-Camera Picture Editing for a Comedy Series. Jeffrey Tambor was nominated that year for Outstanding Supporting Actor in a Comedy Series.

== Home media ==
The first season was released on DVD in region 1 on October 19, 2004, in region 2 on March 21, 2005 and in region 4 on February 23, 2005. Special features on the sets include the unaired and uncensored full-length pilot episode; commentary by series creator Mitchell Hurwitz and cast members on the extended pilot, "Beef Consommé" and "Let 'Em Eat Cake"; deleted and extended scenes; "Breaking Ground: Behind the Scenes of Arrested Development" featurette; The Museum of Television & Radio: Q&A with Creator Mitchell Hurwitz and the cast of Arrested Development; TV Land – "Arrested Development: The Making of a Future Classic"; TV Land Awards — The Future Classic Award; Ron Howard Sneak Peek at Season 2; Arrested Development Promo – "Blind"; Easter Egg – Tobias Outtake.
