= Top Banana (Arrested Development) =

- Arrested Development episode
- George Sr. (top) roughhouses Michael after being told the banana stand was burned down. George Sr.'s line, "There's always money in the banana stand" would go on to become an inside joke between fans, and the character's tendency to hide things in walls would become a reoccurring gag.
- Episode no.: Season 1 Episode 2
- Directed by: Anthony Russo
- Written by: Mitchell Hurwitz; John Levenstein
- Cinematography by: James Hawkinson
- Editing by: Steven Sprung
- Production code: 1AJD01
- Original air date: November 9, 2003
- Running time: 22 minutes

Guest appearances
- Patrice O'Neal as T-Bone; Lillian Hurst as Luz; John Beard as himself

Episode chronology
← Previous "Pilot"	Next → "Bringing Up Buster"
- Arrested Development season 1

"Top Banana" is the second episode of the American television satirical sitcom Arrested Development. Written by series creator Mitchell Hurwitz and co-executive producer John Levenstein, and directed by producer Anthony Russo, it premiered on the Fox Network in the United States on November 9, 2003. The series, narrated by Ron Howard, follows the Bluths, a formerly wealthy, dysfunctional family, who made their money from property development. In the episode, the Bluths' banana stand is burned down, and Tobias, now wanting to become an actor, auditions for a commercial.

"Top Banana" received positive reception from critics upon release, being labeled by several as one of the best episodes of the series. Critics have noted the episode for expanding on ideas that were introduced in "Pilot". It contains the line "There's always money in the banana stand", an often quoted in-joke amongst the series' fans. The episode's major focus, the banana stand, was inspired by a cookie stand run by series creator Mitchell Hurwitz and his brother when they were younger.

== Plot ==
Michael visits his father, George Sr., at the county jail, questioning him on the location of his flight records. George Sr. refuses to answer and instead introduces Michael to one of his jail mates, T-Bone, an arsonist. At home, Michael questions his mom Lucille about the records and is once again unanswered, though Lucille hints about a secret storage unit. Determined to find the records, Michael ventures to the storage unit, only to find it has been burned down, causing him to suspect T-Bone. At home, George Michael decides to work at his dad's frozen banana stand to try and stay away from Maeby, his cousin who he has started to develop romantic feelings for. He tells his father Michael, who orders him to work with Maeby in an attempt to be left alone. At the stand, Maeby and George Michael start taking money from the register to play skeeball.

George Sr. sends T-Bone, who has been released from prison, to work with Maeby and George Michael. George Michael thinks about the money they took and decides to burn down the banana stand to make it seem as if the money was burned. Michael visits the banana stand and finds T-Bone, who confesses to burning down the storage unit. Michael goes to the beach to relax, where he finds his brother Gob. Earlier, Gob had been tasked with delivering a letter containing an insurance check, which he threw into the ocean in an act of petty defiance. At the beach, Michael receives a call from Maeby, who tells him about George Michael's plan to burn down the banana stand. Michael catches George Michael in the act, but after a conversation, Michael allows his son to burn the banana stand down. Michael tells his father of the stand's burning down, only to be told that there was roughly $250,000 lining the walls of the stand.

Meanwhile, Tobias, now wanting to become an actor after his incident with multiple gay actors, (Note: As seen in "Pilot".) goes out to look for work. He auditions for a commercial about a firesale but fails to get the part. His wife Lindsay, hearing about the sale, becomes excited and accidentally gets the part. The next day, Lindsay, hungover after drinking with Lucille, misses the commercial shoot. Tobias, who was next on the commercial call-list, does not hear the phone call due to his crying in the shower.

== Production ==
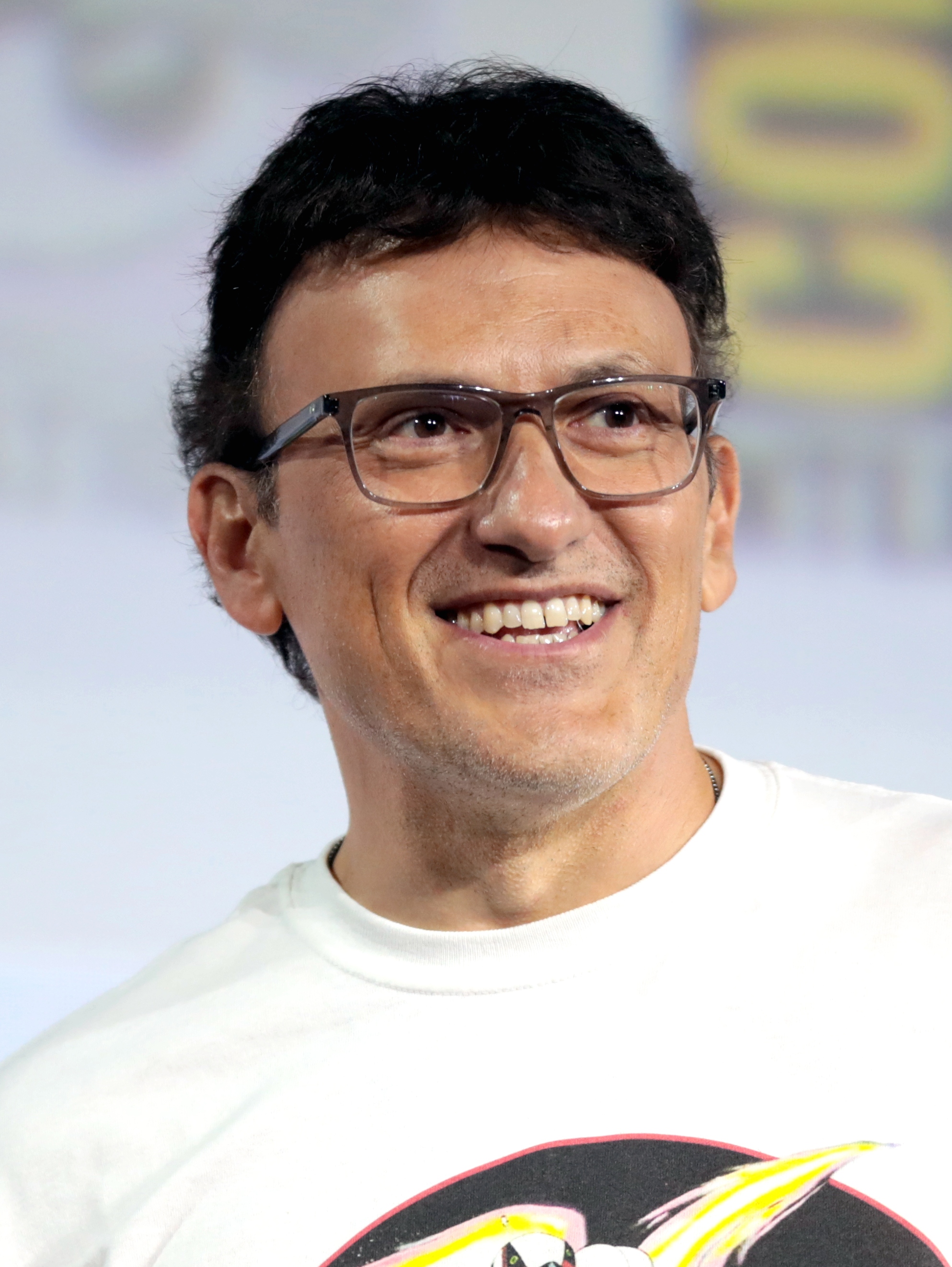
Anthony Russo directed the episode.

"Top Banana" was written by series creator Mitchell Hurwitz and co-executive producer John Levenstein, and was directed by producer Anthony Russo. It was Hurwitz's second writing credit for the series, and Levenstein's first. It was the first episode of the ordered season to be filmed following "Pilot".

A major focus of the episode is on the Bluth family's banana stand. The stand is based on a cookie stand that Hurtwiz and his brother ran when they were younger. It was titled The Chipyard, and was built out of an abandoned taco stand in Newport Beach, California. As of 2011, The Chipyard was still being run by Hurwitz's father, Mark. "Top Banana" was first released on home video in the United States on October 19, 2004 in the Complete First Season DVD box set.

== Themes and analysis ==
"Top Banana" has been called an expansion on the ideas of "Pilot", with Vulture reviewer Brian Tallerico writing, "If the pilot set the foundation, [this episode] built the house". Gob's defiance of Michael's wishes by throwing the letter into the ocean has been described as him showing his weakness and faults; he wishes to be taken as a professional but is still "Vain, gullible, [and] lazy". Gob's anti-professionalism attitude has been contrasted to Aristotle's "account of professional excellence" by author William Irwin, with Gob being the "antithesis of the competent modern illusionist". Critic Rebecca Rosén of Flipscreen noted the episode's theme of living up to expectations, citing Tobias' dream of becoming an actor, and failure to do so, as an example of this.

== Reception ==
=== Viewers ===
In the United States, the episode was watched by 6.70 million viewers on its original broadcast. It received a 3.0% share among adults between the ages of 18 and 49, meaning that it was seen by 3% of all households in that demographic.

=== Critical reception ===
In 2019, Brian Tallerico from Vulture ranked the episode as the fourth best of the whole series, highlighting the multiple "quotable lines" it contains. The A.V. Club writer Noel Murray praised the episode for being able to be as good as the pilot, stating that it was "a second episode which proved the Arrested Development team could sustain a manic, digressive style from episode to episode, as well as showing that they were planning to proceed as an intensely serialized sitcom." Murray made note of the innuendos present in the episode, saying the series "loves its sexual double-entendres".

In 2015, Megan Walsh from Screen Rant ranked "Top Banana" as one of the series' ten best episodes, saying it was "the originator of some of the most enduring, meme-inspiring jokes." Joe George of y!entertainment listed it as one of the series' "episodes you'll wanna rewatch", highlighting its script for having "plenty of space for misunderstandings and foolish one-up-manship". Saloni Gajjar of The A.V. Club listed it as one of the series' funniest episodes, calling it "immaculate dissection of the chaos and comedy that's about to unfold".

=== Legacy ===
When talking to his son Michael whilst in prison, George Sr. says "There's always money in the banana stand"; Michael takes this as his father saying that the banana stand is a successful business, but he is actually referring to the large amount of money he stores in the walls of the stand itself. The line was a notable reoccurring gag, and has become one of the most popular in-jokes amongst fans of the series.
