= Kenny Woods =

American composer, producer and musician

- Born: Kenneth Andrew Woods; October 22, 1969 (age 56); Whittier, CA United States
- Occupations: Producer, Composer
- Spouse: Stacey Grenrock-Woods 1999–present
- Website: http://kennyawoods.com

Kenny Woods (born October 22, 1969, in Los Angeles) is an American composer, producer, and musician. He has performed with various musical acts including: Beck, Flight of the Conchords, Adam Green, Frank Black, Robyn Hitchcock, that dog, Robin Thicke, Sia, The Steven McDonald Group, Jon Brion, Rob Zabrecky (Possum Dixon), Irv Gotti, and many others.

In the early 1990s, he worked in live music production and toured the world with various rock groups including Melvins, Nirvana, Sonic Youth, Beck, Pavement, Hole, Redd Kross, and more. Shortly thereafter, Beck asked him to play guitar, but this union was short-lived when he left to form his own group Old Hickory, a musical outfit at the center of the once burgeoning Silver Lake indie rock scene. In 1999, he began playing with various bands and musicians around East L.A., including his longtime friends: Rob Zabrecky (Possum Dixon), Anna Waronker, Joey Waronker, Steven McDonald (Redd Kross, Melvins), and Josh Schwartz (Beachwood Sparks, Further, Painted Hills). Later he formed the pastoral folk group Anders & Woods with singer/songwriter Tiffany Anders.

For more than a decade, he owned and operated Bright Street Recorders where he produced music and hosted recording sessions for acts including: Sia, Death Cab For Cutie, Vampire Weekend, Ancestors, Imaad Wasif, Robyn Hitchcock, Lucinda Williams, Ben Harper, Lykke Li, Lord Heron, Nite Jewel, Julian Casablancas, Adam Green & Binky Shapiro, JJAMZ Fools Gold, Ricki Lee Jones, M Ward Blake Mills and Jenny Lewis.

In the early 2000s, he worked as a music editor and then an assistant for friend and composer Jon Brion, which had a huge impact on him musically and would ultimately lead to his career in music for TV and film, beginning with HBO's Flight of The Conchords where he served as music producer. Later that year he worked on various film and TV projects including Twilight, Parks and Recreation and Crossing Jordan.

More recently, he has scored, arranged, and produced music for two films, Horror, starring Chloë Sevigny and Baked In Brooklyn, starring Josh Brener and Alexandra Daddario.

Kenny currently lives in Los Angeles with his wife, Stacey Woods, Esquire columnist and former Daily Show With Jon Stewart correspondent.
