= Greg Mottola =

American film director, screenwriter & television director (born 1964)

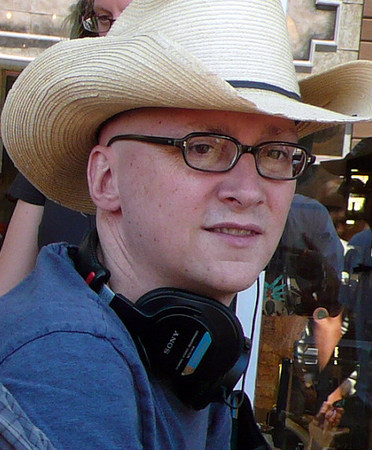
- Mottola in 2009
- Born: Gregory J. Mottola; July 11, 1964 (age 62); Dix Hills, New York, U.S.
- Education: Carnegie Mellon University (BFA); Columbia University (MFA)
- Occupations: Director; screenwriter
- Spouse: Sarah Allentuch
- Children: 3

Gregory J. Mottola (born July 11, 1964) is an American film director, screenwriter and television director.

== Early life and education ==
Mottola grew up in Dix Hills, New York, in a Catholic family of Italian and Irish descent. He received his BFA in art from Carnegie Mellon University and MFA in film from Columbia University.

== Career ==
He wrote and directed the 1996 independent film The Daytrippers, then concentrated for several years on directing in television for series such as Undeclared and Arrested Development.

He has also directed the feature films Superbad, Adventureland and Paul.

Adventureland (2009) is a "first love" story about a group of college-age kids working at an amusement park in the 1980s. The film starred Jesse Eisenberg, Kristen Stewart, Bill Hader and Kristen Wiig. It premiered at the 2009 Sundance Film Festival and received critical praise.

He directed Paul, a science fiction/comedy film about two comic book nerds (played by the film's screenwriters Simon Pegg and Nick Frost) who meet an alien named Paul while vacationing in the US.

Later on, he returned to TV series, such as The Dangerous Book for Boys.

== Personal life ==
Mottola is married to Sarah Allentuch and has three children.

== Filmography ==
=== Short film ===
Year	Title	Director	Writer
1985	The Hatbox	Yes	Yes
1989	Swingin' in the Painter's Room	Yes	No

=== Feature film ===
Year	Title	Director	Writer
1996	The Daytrippers	Yes	Yes
2007	Superbad	Yes	No
2009	Adventureland	Yes	Yes
2011	Paul	Yes	No
2016	Keeping Up with the Joneses	Yes	No
2022	Confess, Fletch	Yes	Yes

=== Television ===
Year	Show	Episode
2001	Undeclared	"Addicts"
2001	Undeclared	"Sick in the Head"
2001	Undeclared	"Eric Visits Again"
2002	Undeclared	"Jobs, Jobs, Jobs"
2002	Undeclared	"Truth or Dare"
2002	Undeclared	"The Perfect Date"
2003	The Big Wide World of Carl Laemke	"Pilot" (unaired)
2003	Arrested Development	"Charity Drive"
2003	Arrested Development	"Visiting Ours"
2004	Arrested Development	"Storming the Castle"
2004	Cracking Up	"Scared Straight"
2005	The Comeback	"Valerie Demands Dignity"
2005	The Comeback	"Valerie Saves the Show"
2012	The Newsroom	"We Just Decided To"
2012	The Newsroom	"The 112th Congress"
2012	The Newsroom	"The Greater Fool"
2018	The Dangerous Book for Boys	"How to Play Poker"
2018	The Dangerous Book for Boys	"How to Walk on the Moon"
2020	Dave	"The Gander"
2020	Dave	"Dave's First"
2020	Dave	"Hypospadias"
2024	Nobody Wants This	"Pilot"
2024	Nobody Wants This	"A Shiksa Walks Into a Temple"
2025	Peacemaker	"A Man Is Only as Good as His Bird"
2025	Peacemaker	"Another Rick Up My Sleeve"

=== TV movie ===
- Clear History (2013)
