= Stacey Grenrock-Woods =

American actress

- Born: Stacey Dee Grenrock; November 22, 1968 (age 57); Los Angeles, United States
- Occupations: Writer, actress
- Spouse: Kenny Woods 1999–present

Stacey Grenrock-Woods (born November 22, 1968, in Los Angeles) is an American writer, actress, and former correspondent on The Daily Show. Her correspondent reports included an investigation of self-proclaimed “Rumpology” who were in the business of giving people psychic reading based on their rear ends.

== Career ==
Grenrock-Woods is also a sex columnist in Esquire magazine and co-editor of L.A. Innuendo magazine. After leaving The Daily Show in 2003, she had a recurring role as local news reporter "Trisha Thoon" on Arrested Development.

The July 2007 issue of Playboy magazine featured a picture from her 1989 Playmate test, which was shot by Richard Fegley and written about in Woods's memoir, I California (Charles Scribner's Sons, 2007). The accompanying text revealed that she had listed Mexican as her favorite kind of food, David Bowie as her favorite musician and rudeness as her pet peeve.

On May 15, 2008, she appeared on Countdown with Keith Olbermann posing as a body language expert, analyzing Bill O'Reilly's teleprompter outburst video from his hosting of Inside Edition.
