= Brad Copeland =

American television writer and producer

- Born: September 12, 1975 (age 51); Orlando, Florida, U.S.
- Occupations: Television producer Film director Television writer Screenwriter
- Known for: Arrested Development

Brad Copeland is an American television writer, producer and film director, best known for his work on the Fox TV series Arrested Development.

== Television career ==
He has written for the television programs Arrested Development, My Name Is Earl, Grounded for Life and NewsRadio.

In 2006, Copeland created the pilot named Southern Comfort for the ABC television network. The pilot revolved around a billionaire who returns to his small town to restore his relationship with his family. ABC chose not to pick up the pilot.

He developed and executive produced the American version of The Inbetweeners for MTV

He formerly worked as writer and executive producer on Life in Pieces.

== Movie career ==
Copeland wrote the screenplay for the 2007 film, Wild Hogs, which revolves around a group of wannabe bikers who encounter bikers from a dangerous New Mexican biker gang. The film was released on March 2, 2007; and stars Tim Allen, Martin Lawrence, William H. Macy and John Travolta.

His other movie credits include Yogi Bear, Coffee Town, which he also directed, Ferdinand, Spies in Disguise, and Jerry & Marge Go Large.

Copeland will be writing the movie version of Knight Rider, as well as the film adaptation for the novel, Flora & Ulysses.
