= Lee Haxall =

American film and television editor

- Occupation: Film editor
- Years active: 1984 - Present

Lee Haxall is an American film and television editor. Haxall won a 1997 CableACE Award for Editing a Comedy/Music Special or Series for Arli$$ and a 2004 Primetime Emmy Award for Outstanding Single-Camera Picture Editing for a Comedy Series for the pilot episode of Arrested Development. Haxall has also edited several high-profile motion pictures such as Meet the Fockers, The Dukes of Hazzard, Beerfest, Take Me Home Tonight and Crazy, Stupid, Love. Haxall received an MFA in Cinema Production from the University of Southern California and worked in the sound department on films like Dune and Night of the Demons before moving into film editing.

== Filmography ==
Year	Film	Director	Other notes
2002	The Shield	Several	6 Episodes
2003	Arrested Development	Several	9 Episodes
2004	Meet the Fockers	Jay Roach	
2005	The Dukes of Hazzard	Jay Chandrasekhar	
2006	Beerfest	Jay Chandrasekhar	
2008	The Love Guru	Marco Schnabel	
2009	NCIS: Los Angeles	Several	7 Episodes
2011	Take Me Home Tonight	Michael Dowse	
2011	Crazy, Stupid, Love	Glenn Ficarra; John Requa	
2013	The Incredible Burt Wonderstone	Don Scardino	
2015	Sisters	Jason Moore	
2016	Mike and Dave Need Wedding Dates	Jake Szymanski	
2018	Overboard	Rob Greenberg	
2019	Always Be My Maybe	Nahnatchka Khan	
2021	The Princess Switch 3: Romancing the Star	Mike Rohl	
2022	Love in the Villa	Mark Steven Johnson	
2026	In Memoriam	Rob Burnett	
2026	Voicemails for Isabelle	Leah McKendrick	Post-production
