= Pilot (Arrested Development) =

- Arrested Development episode
- Michael Bluth (center) smiles for a photo with part of his family.
- Episode no.: Season 1 Episode 1
- Directed by: Anthony Russo; Joe Russo
- Written by: Mitchell Hurwitz
- Cinematography by: James Hawkinson
- Editing by: Lee Haxall
- Production code: 1AJD79
- Original air date: November 2, 2003
- Running time: 22 minutes

Guest appearances
- John Beard as himself; Stacey Grenrock-Woods as Trisha Thoon

Episode chronology
← Previous —	Next → "Top Banana"
- Arrested Development season 1

"Pilot" is the first episode of the American satirical television sitcom Arrested Development. It premiered on Fox in the United States on November 2, 2003. It introduces the Bluth family, which consists of series protagonist Michael (Jason Bateman), his twin sister, Lindsay (Portia de Rossi), his older brother, Gob (Will Arnett), his younger brother, Buster (Tony Hale), their mother, Lucille (Jessica Walter) and father, George Sr. (Jeffrey Tambor); as well as Michael's son, George Michael (Michael Cera), and Lindsay and her husband Tobias' (David Cross) daughter, Maeby (Alia Shawkat). In the episode, George Sr. prepares to announce his retirement from the Bluth Company, but he is arrested for using his company's funds for personal expenses. Aspects of "Pilot" have been likened to Plato's allegory of the cave.

Arrested Development was created by Mitchell Hurwitz, who pitched the series as a satirical take on the American family. Katie O'Connell, who worked closely with the series' production, gave praise towards Hurwitz's script for the episode and noted its similarities to scandals like the fall of Enron. "Pilot" received positive reviews from critics, who praised its unique humor, wit, and lack of a laugh track. Some criticism of the episode came from the unusual romantic interest that George Michael develops on Maeby, his cousin. An extended version of the episode was released as a special feature on the first season's DVD home release.

== Plot ==
For ten years, Michael has been waiting for his father George Sr., to make him a partner in the family's real estate development company. After dropping his son, George Michael, off at the frozen banana stand the family also owns, Michael goes to see his oldest brother, Gob, to ask for his check to cover party expenses. Gob informs Michael that their sister Lindsay has been staying at the Four Seasons for a month with money from the company. Upset by the lying his family has done, Michael goes to tell his mother, Lucille, that the company checkbook is closing. At the banana stand, George Michael's cousin Maeby suggests they kiss at the boat party to teach their parents a lesson that their family should see each other more often, giving George Michael strange thoughts. Back at the hotel, Lindsay's husband, Tobias, mistakes a group of garishly dressed men for pirates, and boards a van of gay protesters.

George Sr. gives his retirement speech and appoints Lucille the new CEO. The dismayed Michael decides it is time to move on. The SEC raids the ship. Lindsay takes command of the boat and Lucille tells Buster, her youngest son, to find a channel to the ocean on the maps, to no avail. The SEC hauls George Sr. away, leaving the family in turmoil. At the police station, Tobias, following a visit to a local theater, informs the family that he has decided to become an actor. Michael then tells the family that their dad is being kept in jail, and the SEC is putting a halt on the company's expense account. Lucille decides to put Buster in charge.

Michael, tired of doing everything for his family, accepts a job in Arizona with a rival development company. When Buster discovers his academic pursuits didn't prepare him for running a big company, the family turns to Michael, begging for his help. Visiting his father in jail, George Sr. informs him that he put Lucille in charge to avoid making him a co-conspirator, under the impression that they cannot arrest a husband and wife for the same crime; he informs his father that this is not in fact true. At the model home, Lindsay is trying to steal some belongings that she can grab and sell when she comes across George Michael. He opens up, saying he wishes the family could see each other more often; when Michael sees this, he decides to stay in California and try to save the family business.

== Production ==
=== Development ===
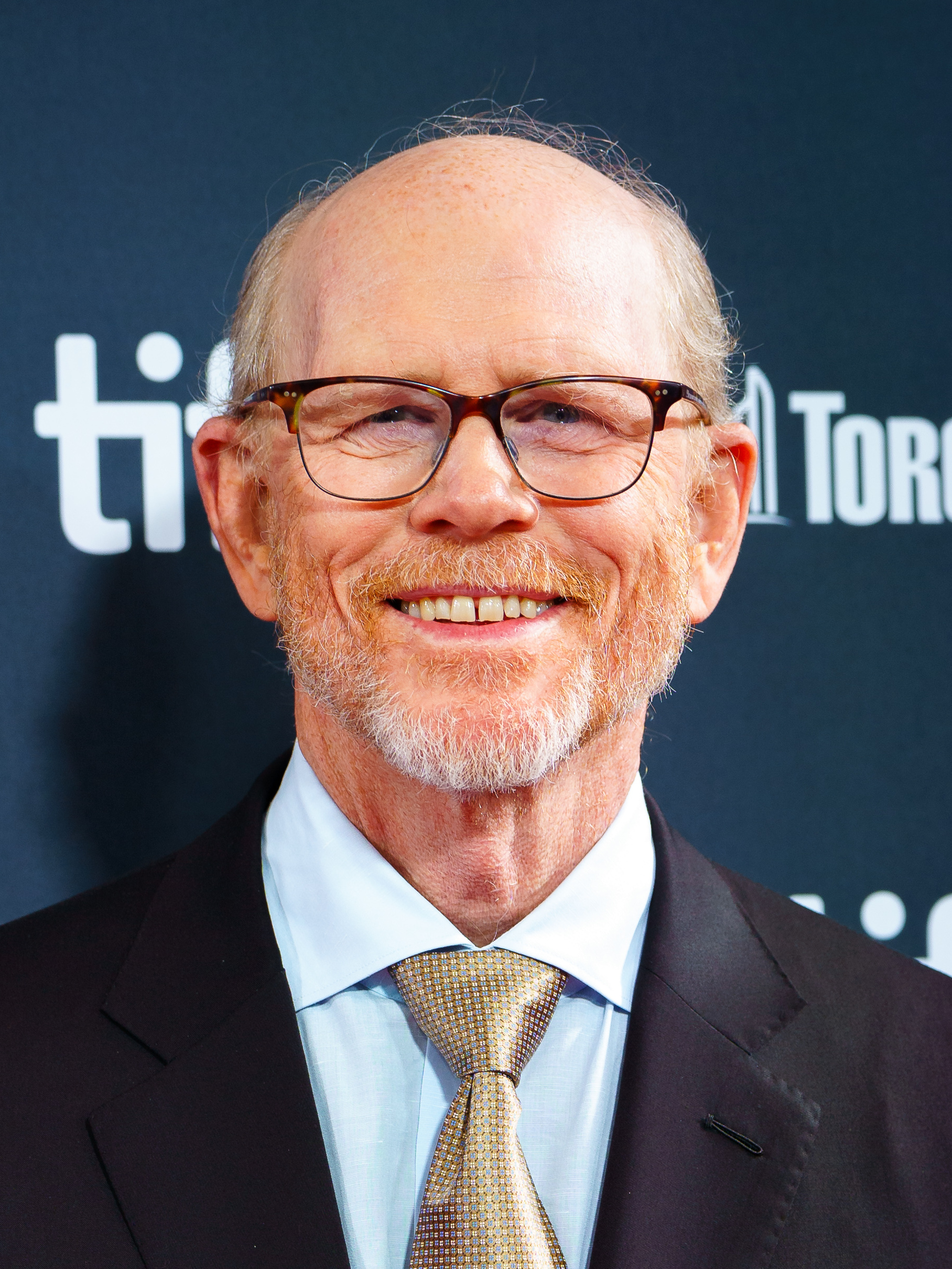
Series executive producer Ron Howard came up with the initial vision of the series.

Initial discussions for the series began in the summer of 2002, when Ron Howard conceived the idea of a sitcom focusing on a dysfunctional family. Howard met several people, including Mitchell Hurwitz, who would go on to create the series. In light of recent corporate accounting scandals, such as the fall of Enron, Hurwitz suggested a story about a "riches to rags" family. Howard and Imagine were interested in using this idea, and signed Hurwitz to write the show. According to Howard, it was originally planned to have the series be shot more like a "faux-documentary" than a sitcom; the idea was eventually dropped.

The concept was pitched and sold to Fox in the fall of 2002. There was a bidding war for the show between Fox and NBC, with the show ultimately selling to Fox as an already agreed-upon put-pilot, which included a six-figure penalty if not aired. Over time, Hurwitz developed the characters and plot of the series.

=== Casting ===
Katie O'Connell, who worked closely with the series' production, found casting the series "daunting" due to needing to find people who would be believable as a family. Alia Shawkat was the first person cast; Michael Cera, Tony Hale, and Jessica Walter were cast from video tapes and flown in to audition for Fox. Hurwitz had seen Cera in another pilot prior to casting, and had specifically requested for him to read the script; Cera liked the script, but Hurtwitz had already forgotten about him before being told this.

Jason Bateman and Portia de Rossi both read and auditioned for Michael and Lindsay, respectively, and were chosen. Hurwitz felt that casting Bateman would be "bad luck" for the series, mainly due to the amount of failed television pilots he had done. He had to audition four separate times before he was cast. When he initially read the script, Bateman enjoyed it, finding it to offer something unconventional from the usual approach to television writing. He felt it's "sardonic" humor set it apart from other shows at the time.

The character of Gob was the most challenging to cast. When Will Arnett auditioned, he depicted the character different from expectations and was chosen. The characters of Tobias and George Sr. were originally going to have minor roles, but David Cross's and Jeffrey Tambor's portrayals mixed well with the rest of the characters, and they were given more significant parts. Cross was hesitant to do the series, due to a desire to move away from television shows that could potentially last for many seasons. He only agreed on the condition he would have a minor role in only a few episodes, but, during the shooting of "Pilot", thought the show was "amazing", and decided to stay.

Ron Howard, the executive producer, initially narrated the pilot as a place-holder. His voice meshed so well with the tone of the series that the decision was made to stick with him. He stayed as the narrator for the remainder of the series. Howard also aided in the casting of "Lucille 2"; the producers told him that their dream actress for the role would be Liza Minnelli but assumed nobody of her stature would take the part. However, she agreed when Ron Howard asked her himself, because they were old friends; she had been his babysitter when he was a child and she was a teen.

=== Writing ===
The family surname Bluth is a shortened version of "Blurred Truth", as conceived by Hurwitz; and similar puns—such as George Michael sharing a name with the singer-songwriter—made the script for "Pilot" confusing to read and understand. Early in the production of "Pilot", Hurwitz intended to include an unseen character named Mark, who would be the Bluth family's "blurred out" son. Hurwitz hoped that Greg Kinnear would portray Mark. The script was 70 pages long, double the length of a usual Arrested Development episode script. It was completed in January 2003, and was filmed that March.

=== Filming ===
Tony Hale, the actor who portrays Buster, recalled that "we didn't really improv that much, because we knew [Mitchell Hurwitz] had a specific way he wanted it done". Joe and Anthony Russo were asked to direct the episode; they credit this to their "guerrilla [filmmaker]" approach, for which they were known at the time. They were asked to "reinvent how we can make television in a way that’s affordable, but also creatively stimulating". The episode shared a set with The O.C., as both take place in Southern California.

The kiss between Alia Shawkat and Michael Cera in the episode was the former's first on-screen kiss. According to Joe Russo, one studio head "hated" how the pilot was shot; she called him after the third day of filming and told him "These dailies are never going to come together". The extended version of "Pilot" includes many lines different from the original cut, including the changing of Gob's "or candy" line to "or cocaine".

== Themes and analysis ==
Certain aspects of "Pilot" have been likened to Plato's allegory of the cave.

Describing the general tone of Arrested Development, Hadley Freeman of The Guardian summarized it as "Monty Python multiplied by The Wire times Withnail and I plus Green Wing plus The Beverly Hillbillies. But more fun." "Pilot" establishes the series' dry, deadpan humor and offbeat satire; and lays the groundwork for aspects that later became part of the series' identity. In the book Arrested Development and Philosophy: They've Made a Huge Mistake, Jason Southworth and Ruth Tallman likened the episode to Plato's allegory of the cave; with Michael's excitement about assuming being made a company partner drawing comparisons to him "living in the cave with his family". The episode lampoons corporate greed, being described as "squarely in the zeitgeist" of issues like the Enron scandal. It also tackles average sitcom ideals, by having the "disciplines of multi-camera comedy" but using a mockumentary-type approach akin to the film stylings of Christopher Guest. The attitude of "Pilot" has been described by Paste writer Carly Silverman as an "early adapter to the changing economic mood [towards America] in the 2000s". Kristin M. Barton, in his book A State of Arrested Development: Critical Essays on the Innovative Television Comedy, noted Lindsay's conflict with the Jewish Defense League over her anti-circumcision protest as proof of how the series displays "possibly the most dysfunctional family ever produced by American wealth."

== Release and reception ==
In the United States, the episode was watched by 7.98 million viewers during its original broadcast on November 2, 2003. "Pilot" was first released on home video in the United States on October 19, 2004 in the Complete First Season DVD box set, which also included an extended version of the episode.

"Pilot" was well received with critics, notably for its deadpan humor and lack of a laugh track. The New York Times critic Alessandra Stanley wrote that any possible comparisons to The Royal Tenenbaums were unfair, noting that Arrested Development dropped the "highbrow precociousness" of that film. She praised the "dry, deadpan tone" and "offbeat satire", saying that the "humor lies in balancing the characters' loopiness with sly, satisfying digs at the rich."

Tim Goodman of the San Francisco Chronicle praised the "film quality" and "comic beauty" of the series, while lauding Bateman's performance as "stunningly great". Goodman also said the series was too funny to survive, comparing it to the recently cancelled series Andy Richter Controls the Universe. The episode was highlighted by Today as one of the best television pilots of the season, praising its earnest humor and writing.

Matt Roush of TV Guide said that the pilot demonstrated it was "sophisticated and invigorating in its barbed wit and freewheeling blackouts and flashbacks" and praised the lack of a laugh track. Robert Bianco of USA Today wrote a largely positive review, exalting the performances of the entire ensemble cast, but called Bateman the standout. He, did, however, feel the series went too far outside the norm with the cousin storyline between George Michael and Maeby, referring to it as "alarming".

The A.V. Club writer Noel Murray wrote that the series premiere used its time well, saying that "between the on-screen titles, the narration, the quick insert shots, the brief flashbacks, and the rapid-fire dialogue, creator Mitchell Hurwitz and his team of writers, directors, and editors impart massive amounts of information in a short span of time." In 2019, Brian Tallerico from Vulture ranked the episode as the fifth best of the whole series, while in 2015, Megan Walsh from Screen Rant ranked the episode as one of the ten best episodes of the show, writing, "From the very first minute of the first episode, the tone of the show was perfectly set."

=== Accolades ===
The episode was honored at the 56th Annual Primetime Emmy Awards. Mitchell Hurwitz won Outstanding Writing for a Comedy Series for writing "Pilot". Joe and Anthony Russo also won Outstanding Directing for a Comedy Series for their directorial work on the episode. In addition, it was nominated for Outstanding Art Direction for a Multi-Camera Series, and editor Lee Haxall won Outstanding Single-Camera Picture Editing for a Comedy Series.

== See also ==
- Production of Arrested Development season 1
- Michael Bluth
