= Fünke family =

Family in the Arrested Development sitcom

The Fünkes
- Arrested Development family
- From left to right: Tobias (David Cross), Lindsay (Portia de Rossi), and Maeby (Alia Shawkat) in season 4.
- First appearance: "Pilot"; November 2, 2003
- Last appearance: "The Fallout"; March 15, 2018
- Created by: Mitchell Hurwitz

The Fünke (Note: /ˈfjuːŋkeɪ/ FYOON-kay) family is a fictional family depicted on the American television satirical sitcom Arrested Development, which aired on the Fox Network (2003–2006) and later on Netflix (2013, 2018–2019).

The series, narrated by Ron Howard, mainly follows the Bluths, a formerly wealthy, dysfunctional family, who made their money from property development; the Fünkes are related to the Bluths through Lindsay Bluth-Fünke (Portia de Rossi). The Fünkes consist of three family members: Tobias (David Cross), the patriarch; Lindsay, the matriarch; and Maeby (Alia Shawkat), the daughter, who is also the youngest member of the Fünkes and was conceived in a lab. Each member is unique, with Tobias being a psychiatrist turned actor, Lindsay being a spoiled activist, and Maeby being a rebellious teenager often looking for ways to disobey her mother.

Cross was not the first person to be approached with the character of Tobias, that being Andy Dick; however, he already had a series he was working on, and an originally reluctant Cross was soon given the role. De Rossi was looking for a role similar to her previous work in Ally McBeal, and agreed to it upon reading the script. Named after a combination of series creator Mitchell Hurwitz's two daughters' names, Maeby, along with Michael Cera for George Michael Bluth, was the first cast member to officially join the series. The three would go on to receive multiple award nominations for their portrayals of the characters.

== Main family ==
The Fünkes are one of the two principal families in Arrested Development, alongside the wealthy Bluth family, who made their money from property development and several other business ventures.

=== Tobias ===
David Cross portrays Tobias Fünke, former psychiatrist turned actor, the patriarch of the Fünke family, the husband of Lindsay, and the father of Maeby. Tobias is frequently flamboyant, yet acts oblivious to his closeted homosexuality, and speaks often in innuendos. Tobias is determined to succeed in his endeavors, and works hard to do so, but he almost never does. Throughout the series, Tobias is shown to have a disorder known as "never-nudity", which causes him to never be able to be fully nude, always wearing denim cut-offs under his pants.

=== Lindsay ===
Lindsay Fünke is played by Portia de Rossi, and is a spoiled, materialistic liberal activist. She is heavily critical of those around her, and has barely ever worked in her life. In an attempt to upset her mother, Lindsay married Tobias, which she would go on to regret, and the two split up later in the series, giving her the opportunity to have an affair with politician Hebert Love; she also acts neglectfully towards her daughter, Maeby. Born from her once-believed-to-be-her-mother Lucille's mother, Mimi, she, known at the time as Nellie Sitwell, was put up for adoption at age 3 and adopted by Lucille.

=== Maeby ===
Maeby Fünke is the rebellious and sarcastic daughter of Tobias and Lindsay.

== Casting and creation ==
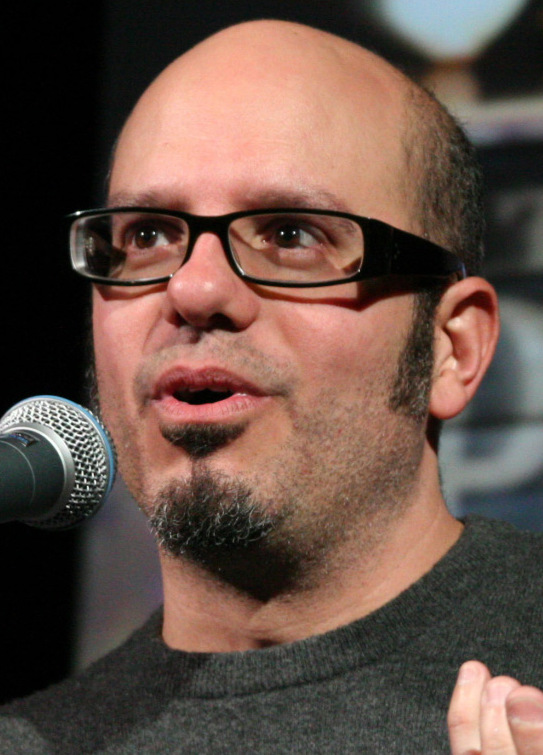
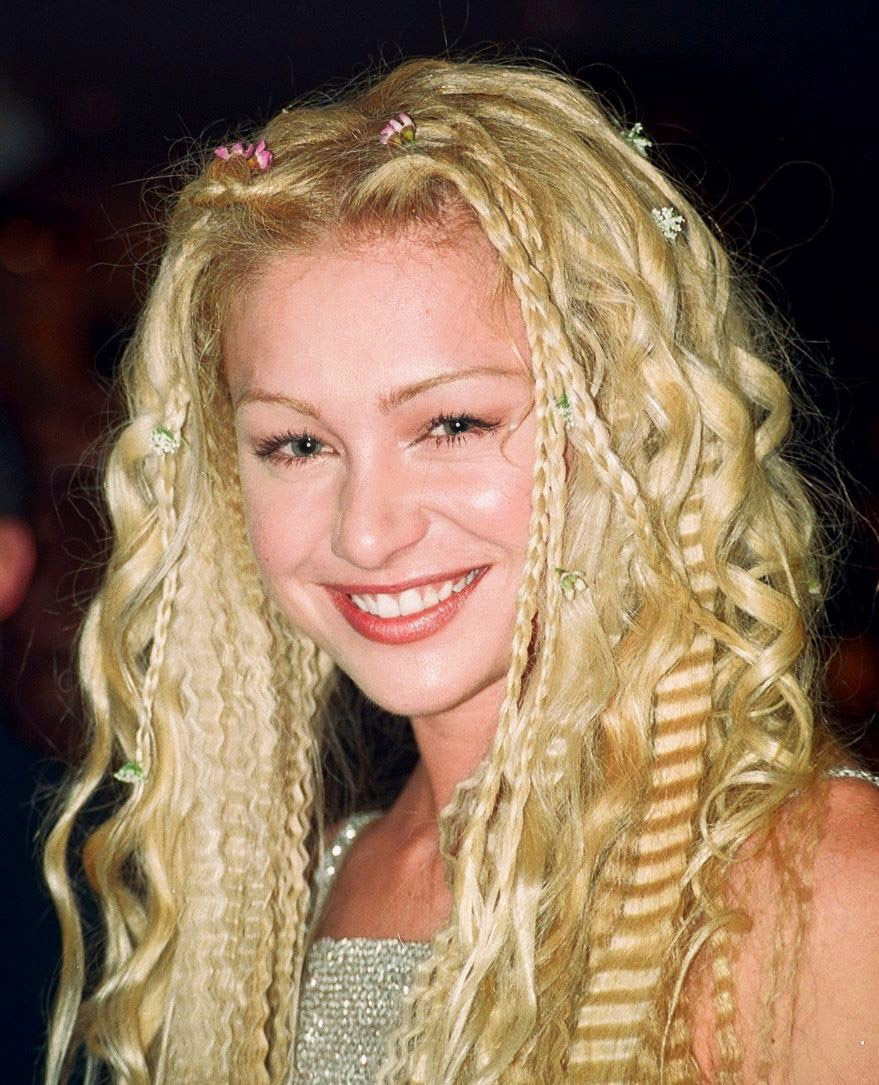
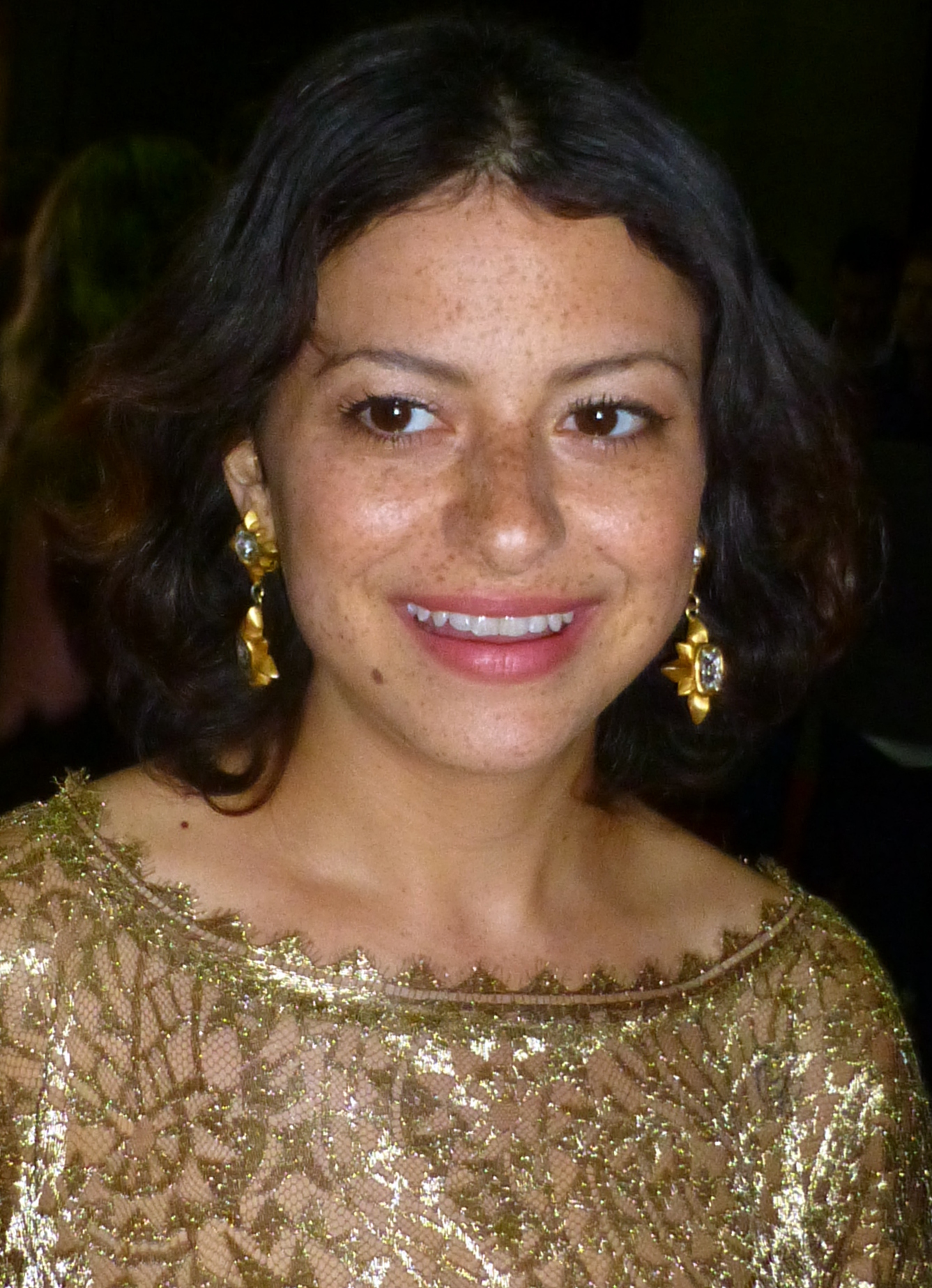
The Fünke's actors; From left, David Cross as Tobias, Portia de Rossi as Lindsay, and Alia Shawkat as Maeby.

Before Cross was approached to play the role, series creator Mitchell Hurwitz asked Andy Dick to audition for Tobias. However, Dick was already committed to the ABC sitcom Less Than Perfect, and could not take the part. Then, Hurwitz asked Cross to audition for the role of Buster, but asked for Tobias instead, since it was only to be a reoccurring role, and he was looking to not commit to a long-term project and move away from television. Hurwitz was so impressed by Cross' audition that Tobias was bumped up to a main character, and Cross also found the series to be "amazing" while shooting "Pilot", persuading him to stay.

De Rossi, known at the time for Ally McBeal, was looking for a role in a similar series. She ultimately decided to audition for Lindsay after reading the script for "Pilot" and feeling it offered something fresh in the often stale genre of comedic television. Hurwitz named Maeby after his daughters May and Phoebe, combining the two into one; he acknowledged how odd the name was, but felt it offered a realistic look into how names can sometimes be unique and weird. Shawkat auditioned for Maeby in Los Angeles along with Michael Cera, who portrays George Michael Bluth on the series. Their audition impressed the producers, and Cera and Shawkat were the first to officially join the cast.

== Reception ==
=== Accolades ===
At the 8th Golden Satellite Awards, Cross received a nomination for Best Supporting Actor in a Television Series, losing to fellow Arrested Development cast member Jeffrey Tambor. Cross, along with the rest of the series' cast, (Note: Including de Rossi and Shawkat.) would go on to be nominated for Outstanding Performance by an Ensemble in a Comedy Series 3 separate times at the Screen Actors Guild Awards in 2004, 2005, and 2014; they would lose each time. For portraying Lindsay, de Rossi would receive 2 Satellite Awards nominations, one for Satellite Award for Best Supporting Actress in a Television Series in 2004—losing to Jessica Walter, who plays Lucille on the series— and Best Actress in a Television Series Musical or Comedy in 2005, which she won. Shawkat won an award for Best Performance in a TV Series (Comedy or Drama) from a Supporting Young Actress at the 26th Young Artist Awards.
