= James Hawkinson =

American cinematographer

James Hawkinson is an American cinematographer known for his work in television, music videos, and film. He is best known for his critically acclaimed work on the Hannibal and The Man in the High Castle television series', for which he has received numerous accolades including a Primetime Emmy Award and a nomination for an ASC Award.

== Life and career ==
Hawkinson began his career as an electrician, lighting technician, and gaffer at Boss Film Studios, a prominent visual effects company. He worked on numerous big-budget, effects-heavy films like Alien 3, Species, and Air Force One, and lower-budget genre films like Intruder and Fist of the North Star. Starting in 1997, he became a highly prolific DP for music videos, with over 200 credits to his name.

Hawkinson served as director of photography on the sitcom Arrested Development for which he experimented with different 16 mm film cameras and HD camcorders in order to achieve the look and visual styles desired by the series' creators Joe and Anthony Russo. He worked on several subsequent television projects with the Russos, including Carpoolers, The Increasingly Poor Decisions of Todd Margaret, and Community. He shot the horror film The Unborn and the 2007 remake of The Hitcher, both of which were produced by Platinum Dunes.

Starting in 2013, Hawkinson served as the series DP on Hannibal, a psychological thriller -drama series based on the novels by Thomas Harris. His photography heavily utilizing angular lighting and shallow focus to create a distinct, unnerving atmosphere. His work was a point of near-universal acclaim, many praising its dark, brooding, art-house style and disturbing atmosphere, with many calling it the best-looking show on television.

His work on the first season of the dystopian science fiction series The Man in the High Castle earned him a Primetime Emmy Award for Outstanding Cinematography for a Single-Camera Series and a nomination for an ASC Award.

In 2025, Hawkinson was appointed as a member of the jury at the 78th Locarno Film Festival for First Feature Competition.

== Filmography ==
=== Television ===
Year	Title	Notes
2003–04	Arrested Development	11 episodes
2007–08	Carpoolers	11 episodes
2009	Secret Girlfriend	2 episodes
2009–10	Community	26 episodes
2010	Running Wilde	Pilot episode
2011	Happy Endings	Pilot episode
2013–15	Hannibal	35 episodes
2015–19	The Man in the High Castle	19 episodes Nominated for: Primetime Emmy Award for Outstanding Cinematography for a Single-Camera Series; ASC Award for Outstanding Cinematography in a Television Movie/Mini-series/Pilot; Won: Primetime Emmy Award for Outstanding Cinematography for a Single-Camera Series
2019	The Enemy Within	Pilot episode
2020	Barkskins	2 episodes
2021	Billions	2 episodes
2022	Bel-Air	5 episodes
2023	Gotham Knights	Pilot episode

=== Film ===
Year	Title	Dir.	Notes
1989	Intruder	Scott Spiegel	Electrician
1992	Alien 3	David Fincher	Electrician: Boss Film Studios
1995	Fist of the North Star	Tony Randel	2nd unit electrician
1995	Species	Roger Donaldson	Electrician: Boss Film Studios
1997	Turbulence	Robert Butler	Electrician: Boss Film Studios
1997	Selena	Gregory Nava	Camera operator
1997	Air Force One	Wolfgang Petersen	Camera operator
1998	Progeny	Brian Yuzna	
2006	Lonely Hearts	Todd Robinson	Additional photography with Peter Levy
2007	The Hitcher	Dave Meyers	
2007	Aliens vs. Predator: Requiem	The Brothers Strause	Additional photography with Daniel C. Pearl
2009	The Unborn	David S. Goyer	

=== Music videos ===
Song title	Artist	Dir.
"Ænema"	Tool	Adam Jones
"All for You"	Sister Hazel	Thomas Mignone
"Sock It 2 Me"	Missy Elliott	Hype Williams
"Pride"	Rachid	Rocky Schenck
"I'm Losing You"	John Lennon and Cheap Trick	Dean Karr
"Windowlicker"	Aphex Twin	Chris Cunningham
"Kryptonite"	3 Doors Down	Dean Karr
"X"	Xzibit	Dave Meyers
"With Arms Wide Open"	Creed	Dave Meyers
"Want You Bad"	The Offspring	Spencer Susser
"Get Ur Freak On"	Missy Elliott	Dave Meyers
"Hey Baby"	No Doubt	Dave Meyers
"Defy You"	The Offspring	Dave Meyers
"My Sacrifice"	Creed	Dave Meyers
"Up All Night"	Unwritten Law	Honey
"Molly's Chambers"	Kings of Leon	Honey
"Drain the Blood"	The Distillers	Dean Karr
"Ambulance vs. Ambulance"	The Blood Brothers	Laurent Briet
"Used to Love U"	John Legend	Ben Mor
"Numb"	Linkin Park	Joe Hahn
"Naughty Girl"	Beyoncé	Jake Nava
"Ain't Coming Home"	Silvertide	Honey
"Over and Over"	Nelly featuring Tim McGraw	Erik White
"Southside"	Lloyd	Irv Gotti
"Breaking the Habit"	Linkin Park	Joe Hahn
"From Yesterday"	Thirty Seconds to Mars	Bartholomew Cubbins
"Everyman Everywoman"	Yoko Ono	Honey
"Teary Eyed"	Missy Elliott	Antti Jokinen
"Lonely Day"	System of a Down	Josh & Xander
"I Feel It All"	Feist	Patrick Daughters
"Fly on the Wall"	Miley Cyrus	Philip Andelman
"Beat of My Drum"	Nicola Roberts	Wendy Morgan
"(It) Feels So Good"	Steven Tyler	Ray Kay
"Our Perfect Disease"	The Wombats	Mark Staubach
"Up All Night"	Blink-182	Isaac Rentz
"We Are Young"	fun. ft. Janelle Monáe	Marc Klasfeld

=== Video album ===
Year	Title	Artist	Dir.
2003	Live in Texas	Linkin Park	Kimo Proudfoot

== Awards and nominations ==
- Nominated:
  - 2001 MTV Video Music Award for Best Cinematography – Get Ur Freak On
  - 2016 ASC Award Outstanding Achievement in Cinematography in Television Movie/Mini-Series/Pilot – The Man in the High Castle
  - 2017 Primetime Emmy Award for Outstanding Cinematography for a Single-Camera Series – The Man in the High Castle
- Won:
  - 2016 Primetime Emmy Award for Outstanding Cinematography for a Single-Camera Series – The Man in the High Castle
