= Marta Complex =

- Arrested Development episode
- Episode no.: Season 1 Episode 12
- Directed by: Joe Russo
- Written by: John Levenstein; Jim Vallely
- Cinematography by: Greg Harrington
- Editing by: Steven Sprung
- Production code: 1AJD11
- Original air date: February 8, 2004
- Running time: 22 minutes

Guest appearances
- Liza Minnelli as Lucille Austero; Patricia Velásquez as Marta Estrella; Carl Weathers as himself; B.W. Gonzalez as Lupe

Episode chronology
← Previous "Public Relations"	Next → "Beef Consommé"
- Arrested Development season 1

"Marta Complex" is the twelfth episode of the first season of the American television satirical sitcom Arrested Development. It was written by co-executive producer John Levenstein and consulting producer Jim Vallely, and directed by producer Joe Russo. It originally aired on Fox on February 8, 2004.

The series, narrated by Ron Howard, follows the Bluths, a formerly wealthy, dysfunctional family, who made their money from property development. The Bluth family consists of Michael, his twin sister Lindsay, his older brother Gob, his younger brother Buster, their mother Lucille and father George Sr., as well as Michael's son George Michael, and Lindsay and her husband Tobias' daughter Maeby. In the episode, on Valentine's Day, Marta begins to fall for Michael, to his and Gob's misunderstanding. George Michael investigates his cousin's parentage for validation of his crush. Buster moves out of his mother's apartment. Lindsay wants a divorce from Tobias.

== Plot ==
Michael convinces Lucille to throw what she thinks is a Valentine's Day party, but is in fact, an anniversary party for Tobias and Lindsay. Marta is impressed by the romantic side of Michael when she finds out he is responsible for the party. George Michael searches for a sign using the messages stamped on candy hearts for his crush on Maeby, finding one that reads "Maybe Tonight". Lucille, still trying to break up the relationship between Buster and Lucille Austero, sets Austero up with Carl Weathers, Tobias' acting coach, on a night Buster has class. Michael gives a toast to love in general, and Marta realizes that Michael is the one she should be with, not Gob. The next morning, Lindsay decides she needs to divorce Tobias, whose never-nude affliction is too much for her.

Meanwhile, Gob thinks Marta is cheating on him with a man named Hermano after overhearing her on the phone talking to her mother, but "hermano" is Spanish for "brother" as she was talking about Michael. Neither Michael nor Gob realize this, and they agree to work together to find Hermano. Lindsay decides she and George Michael will switch roommates: he will bunk with Tobias now and she with Maeby, leading him to fear that Tobias saw the "Maybe Tonight" candy heart and figured out his crush. Buster, fed up with his mother's interference, decides to move out and live with Lucille Austero, but she does not want to be his substitute mother and does not allow him to move in. Lucille Bluth refuses to let him move back in. Michael follows Marta around all day in an effort to track down Hermano. Lucille visits George Sr. in prison for advice for being nervous about living alone for the first time.

Buster arrives at the model home, where Tobias is excited about an upcoming audition for the role of "Frightened Inmate #2". Marta drops by, and Buster falls in love with her. Michael, who had been following Marta, arrives and is surprised to see both Buster and Marta. He agrees to let Buster stay with him for a while. Marta asks Michael if they can go out to dinner to have a talk. Lindsay confesses to Maeby that she and Tobias are having trouble. In the next room, Tobias confesses to George Michael that he has not had sex with Lindsay in years and that they could not conceive, which makes George Michael wonder if Maeby is not a blood relative. George Michael plucks one of Maeby's hairs for a DNA test. Michael and Marta have dinner at her house, where she alludes to her attraction to Michael. Michael calls out Marta for her affair. She misunderstands, thinking he is rebuking her for pursuing her feelings for him without telling Gob first, and asks him to leave. Then he notices a gift and note addressed to him, and asks Marta's son who "hermano" is, upon which he points to his sleeping brother. Michael finally realizes that she was referring to him. Tobias realizes he has to do a nude scene as Frightened Inmate #2.

== Production ==
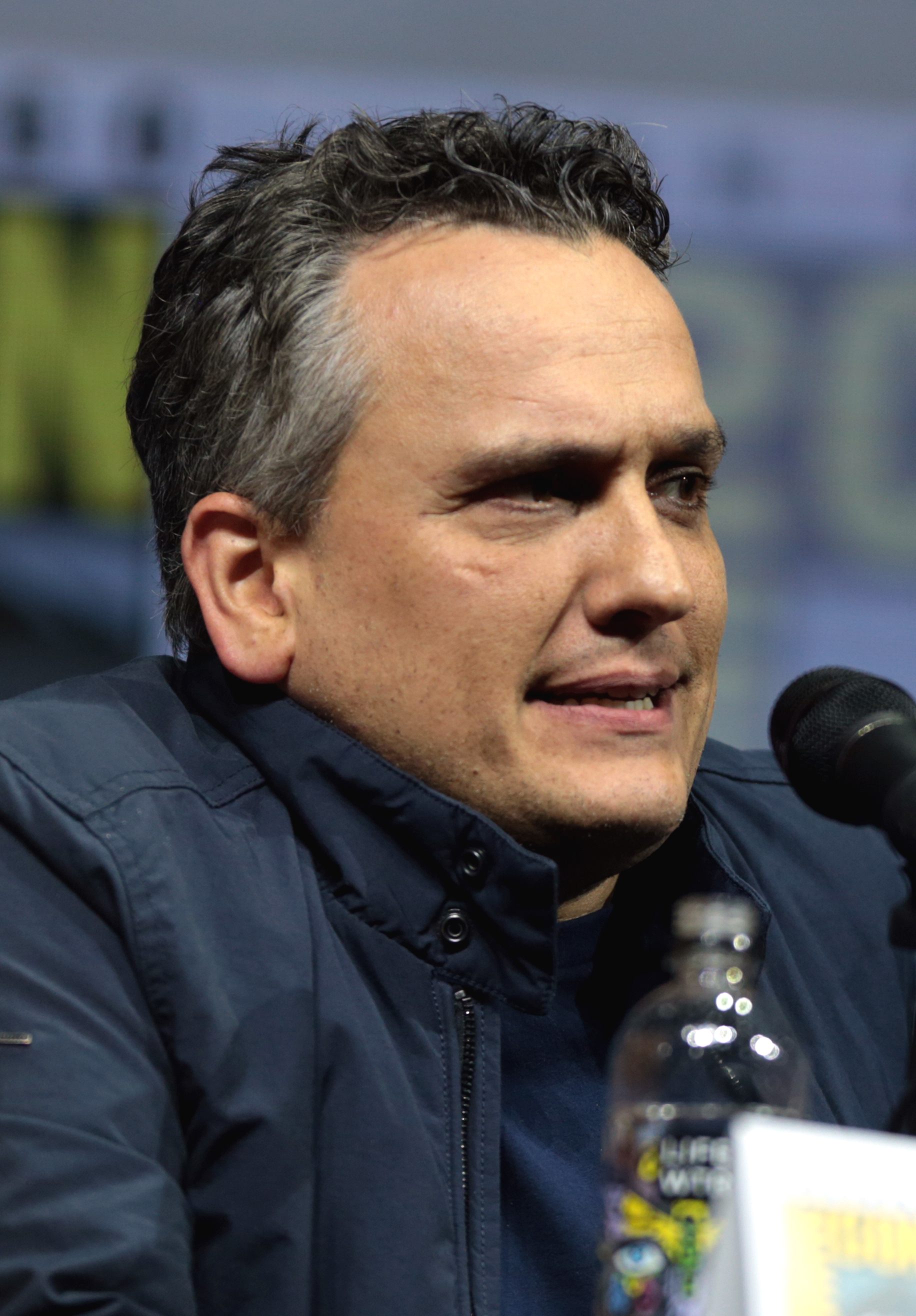
Joe Russo directed "Marta Complex".

"Marta Complex" was directed by producer Joe Russo, and written by co-executive producer John Levenstein and consulting producer Jim Vallely. It was Russo's fifth directing credit, Levenstein's third writing credit and Vallely's second writing credit. It was the eleventh episode of the ordered season to be filmed after the pilot.

== Reception ==
=== Viewers ===
In the United States, the episode was watched by 4.89 million viewers on its original broadcast, a decrease of almost 1.5 million viewers from the previous episode.

=== Critical reception ===
The A.V. Club writer Noel Murray called the episode "a fine starting-point for an Arrested Development, but “Marta Complex” doesn’t click as well as the four episodes that precede it, largely because of its rickety A-story, involving Michael’s efforts to find out whether Marta has been cheating on [Gob]." In 2019, Brian Tallerico from Vulture ranked the episode 56th out of the whole series, saying it "always felt a bit beneath Arrested Development".
