= Beef Consommé =

- Arrested Development episode
- Episode no.: Season 1 Episode 13
- Directed by: Jay Chandrasekhar
- Written by: Chuck Martin; Richard Rosenstock
- Cinematography by: Greg Harrington
- Editing by: Lee Haxall
- Production code: 1AJD12
- Original air date: February 15, 2004
- Running time: 22 minutes

Guest appearances
- Henry Winkler as Barry Zuckerkorn; Patricia Velásquez as Marta Estrella

Episode chronology
| ← Previous "Marta Complex" | Next → "Shock and Aww" |
- Arrested Development season 1

"Beef Consommé" is the thirteenth episode of the first season of the American television satirical sitcom Arrested Development. It was written by supervising producer Chuck Martin and co-executive producer Richard Rosenstock, and directed by Jay Chandrasekhar. It originally aired on Fox on February 15, 2004.

The series, narrated by Ron Howard, follows the Bluths, a formerly wealthy, dysfunctional family, who made their money from property development. The Bluth family consists of Michael, his twin sister Lindsay, his older brother Gob, his younger brother Buster, their mother Lucille and father George Sr., as well as Michael's son George Michael, and Lindsay and her husband Tobias' daughter Maeby. In the episode, the family must appear at George Sr.'s arraignment hearing, but proceedings are jeopardized by Michael and Marta's relationship guilt and Gob's hunt for his unknown rival for Marta.

== Plot ==
Michael, Lucille, George Sr., and their attorney Barry Zuckerkorn meet at the prison to discuss George Sr.'s arraignment the next day. Barry tells them they should all show up and appear loving and supportive. Gob is still looking for "Hermano", the man he suspects is having an affair with Marta. Michael tells him that he will speak to Marta on his behalf. At Marta's house, she and Michael confess their mutual attraction and start making love. However, with reminders of Gob all around, they realize they can only honor their shared commitment to family by telling him before going further. Maeby is tired of Tobias and Lindsay's constant fighting. Gob tells Michael he plans to beat up Hermano, and Buster overhears, imagining what it might be like to get into a fight, having spent his whole life under his mother's wing.

Lucille calls to remind the family about George Sr.'s hearing. George Michael decides to investigate whether or not Maeby really is his blood relative, and asks Tobias to elaborate on his comment about having trouble conceiving. Tobias becomes distracted when he realizes that his role as "Frightened Inmate #2" is a shower scene; as a never-nude, this poses a problem for him. Buster asks Gob if he can ask Marta out. Gob, not taking him seriously, tells him to go ahead. When he overhears Buster say "hermano" and learns what it means, Gob assumes Marta is involved with the actor who plays her character's brother Tio on El Amor Prohibido. He leaves to find him, and Michael goes after to stop him. George Michael learns that Maeby was a test-tube baby, which he assumes means they are not actually related. Gob reaches the soap opera set and takes a swing at the actor, who knocks Gob out.

When Gob wakes up, Michael tells him he is Hermano, and Gob gives him his blessing. Michael rushes to Marta's to tell her. Lucille interrupts, calling to say that Michael is late for his father's hearing. Buster had rented a mariachi band to proclaim his love for Marta, but arrived just a few seconds after Michael did. At the courthouse, only Lucille and Gob show up for the hearing on time, with Barry arriving shortly after George Sr. is led in and Buster coming in with the mariachi band. He tells Gob about seeing Michael kissing Marta a few minutes ago, which makes Gob jealous. As the judge reads the long list of charges against George Sr., Michael arrives and is accosted by Gob. They brawl their way out of the courtroom onto the street. George Sr. uses the chaotic situation to escape through the courthouse stairwell but accidentally runs back to the holding cells. While Michael, Gob, and Buster fight on the courthouse lawn, Lucille leaves for home. Marta arrives, sees them fighting, and says she does not want either of them, causing Michael and Gob to make up. Tobias, with Lindsay's help, tries to overcome his problem with nudity. They take their clothes off together, leading them to reconnect as a couple for the first time in years. Tobias, after overcoming his never-nude problem, walks naked into the dining room while the family eats breakfast.

== Production ==
"Beef Consommé" was directed by Jay Chandrasekhar, and written by supervising producer Chuck Martin and co-executive producer Richard Rosenstock. It was Chandrasekhar's second directing credit, Martin's second writing credit and Rosenstock's third writing credit. It was the twelfth and final episode filmed of Fox's original season order after they picked up the series from the pilot, and was designed to serve as a series finale if they had chosen not to order any more.

== Reception ==
=== Viewers ===
In the United States, the episode was watched by 5.21 million viewers on its original broadcast.

=== Critical reception ===
The A.V. Club writer Noel Murray praised the episode, calling it "a damned funny episode, and heavier on the slapstick and visual gags than usual". In 2019, Brian Tallerico from Vulture ranked the episode 55th out of the whole series, saying "it still suffers from the goofiness of that “Hermano” arc" from the previous episode, "Marta Complex".
