= List of Arrested Development characters =

Television sitcom characters

Arrested Development is an American television sitcom that originally aired on Fox from November 2, 2003, to February 10, 2006. A fourth season of 15 episodes was released on Netflix on May 26, 2013, and a fifth season was released in two parts on May 29, 2018, and March 15, 2019. Created by Mitchell Hurwitz, the show centers the Bluth family. The Bluths are formerly wealthy and a habitually dysfunctional family. It is presented in a continuous format, and incorporates hand-held camera work, narration, archival photos, and historical footage. The series stars Jason Bateman, Portia de Rossi, Will Arnett, Michael Cera, Alia Shawkat, Tony Hale, David Cross, Jeffrey Tambor, and Jessica Walter. In addition, Ron Howard serves as the series narrator and an executive producer on the show.

The main characters of Arrested Development can be divided into the Bluth (/bluːθ/ BL OOTH) and Fünke (/ˈfjuːŋkeɪ/ FYOON-kay) families.

== Bluth family tree ==
George Oscar; Bluth Sr.	Lucille; Bluth	Oscar George; Bluth
Wife of Gob	George Oscar "Gob" Bluth II	Eve; Holt	Michael; Bluth	Tracey; Bluth†	Lindsay; Bluth Fünke	Tobias Onyango; Fünke	Byron "Buster"; Bluth
Steve; Holt	George Michael; Bluth	Mae "Maeby"; Fünke	Murphy Brown; Fünke	Hel-Loh "Annyong"; Bluth

† denotes a deceased character
Dashed lines denote adoption

== Cast table ==
Character	Portrayed by	Season				
Character	Portrayed by	1	2	3	4	5
Main characters
Michael Bluth	Jason Bateman	Main	Main	Main	Main	Main
Lindsay Bluth-Fünke	Portia de Rossi	Main	Main	Main	Main	Main
Gob Bluth	Will Arnett	Main	Main	Main	Main	Main
George Michael Bluth	Michael Cera	Main	Main	Main	Main	Main
Maeby Fünke	Alia Shawkat	Main	Main	Main	Main	Main
Buster Bluth	Tony Hale	Main	Main	Main	Main	Main
Tobias Fünke	David Cross	Main	Main	Main	Main	Main
George Bluth Sr.	Jeffrey Tambor	Main	Main	Main	Main	Main
Lucille Bluth	Jessica Walter	Main	Main	Main	Main	Main
Narrator	Ron Howard	Main (Note: Howard is uncredited for all narration. He is, however, credited for the episodes in seasons 4 and 5 in which he appears as a fictionalized version of himself. For these appearances he is credited as a guest star.)	Main	Main	Main	Main
Supporting characters
Oscar Bluth	Jeffrey Tambor	Recurring	Recurring	Recurring	Recurring	Recurring
Lucille Austero	Liza Minnelli	Recurring	Recurring		Recurring	
Barry Zuckerkorn	Henry Winkler	Recurring	Recurring	Guest	Recurring	Recurring
Kitty Sanchez	Judy Greer	Recurring	Recurring	Guest	Recurring	Recurring
Steve Holt	Justin Grant Wade	Recurring	Recurring	Recurring	Recurring	Recurring
Lupe	B.W. Gonzalez	Recurring	Recurring	Recurring	Guest	
Annyong Bluth	Justin Lee	Recurring	Guest	Guest	Guest	
Carl Weathers	Himself	Recurring	Guest		Guest	
Maggie Lizer	Julia Louis-Dreyfus	Recurring	Recurring			
Stefan Gentles	James Lipton	Recurring		Guest	Guest	Guest
G.O.B.'s Wife	Amy Poehler	Recurring	Guest			
Marta Estrella	Patricia Velasquez (Note: Marta is portrayed by Leonor Varela in her first two appearances.)	Recurring				
Cindi Lightballoon	Jane Lynch	Recurring				
John Beard	Himself	Recurring	Recurring	Recurring	Recurring	Recurring
Ann Veal	Mae Whitman (Note: In the season 1 finale, Ann is portrayed by Alessandra Torresani.)	Guest	Recurring	Recurring	Recurring	
Wayne Jarvis	John Michael Higgins	Guest	Recurring	Recurring		
Dr. Fishman	Ian Roberts	Guest	Recurring		Guest	
Stan Sitwell	Ed Begley Jr.		Recurring	Guest	Recurring	Recurring
Sally Sitwell	Christine Taylor		Recurring		Recurring	Recurring
Mort Meyers	Jeff Garlin		Recurring	Recurring	Recurring	
Starla	Mo Collins		Recurring			
Tony Wonder	Ben Stiller		Guest	Guest	Recurring	Recurring
Gene Parmesan	Martin Mull		Guest		Recurring	Recurring
Terry Veal	Alan Tudyk		Guest		Recurring	Recurring
Andy, Donnie, Emmett and Rocky Richter	Andy Richter		Guest	Guest	Recurring	
Rita Leeds	Charlize Theron			Recurring		
Trevor	Dave Thomas			Recurring		
Larry Middleman	Bob Einstein			Recurring		
Bob Loblaw	Scott Baio			Recurring	Guest	
Ron Howard	Himself			Guest	Recurring	Guest
DeBrie Bardeaux	Maria Bamford				Recurring	Recurring
Rebel Alley	Isla Fisher				Recurring	Recurring
Herbert Love	Terry Crews				Recurring	
Marky Bark	Chris Diamantopoulos				Recurring	
Argyle Austero	Tommy Tune				Recurring	Guest
Paul "P-Hound" Huan	Richard Jin Namjung				Recurring	
Mark Cherry	Daniel Amerman				Recurring	
Murphy Brown Fünke	Kyle Mooney					Recurring
Lottie Dottie Da	Frances Conroy					Recurring
Dusty Radler	Dermot Mulroney					Recurring

== Primary characters ==
=== Michael Bluth ===
Michael Bluth (played by Jason Bateman) is the second oldest Bluth son and the main protagonist of Arrested Development. He is the father of George Michael Bluth and widower to Tracey Bluth. In season 3, it is revealed that there is a typo on his birth certificate, which reads Nichael Bluth. Michael's wife Tracey died of ovarian cancer two years before the first season. His role in the story is that he is the one son who has no choice but to keep the family together, and he serves as the straight man in the comedy series. Throughout the original run of the show, Michael is consistently the de facto president of the Bluth Company after his father's arrest. He is the only main character who appears in every episode of the series.

=== Lindsay Bluth-Fünke ===
Lindsay Bluth-Fünke (Portia de Rossi) is the adopted daughter of George Sr. and Lucille Bluth, as well as half-sister of Lucille, who raised her and Michael to believe that they were twins. She is unhappily married to Tobias and together they are the neglectful and self-absorbed parents of Maeby.

Lindsay is vain, greedy, selfish, and materialistic, claiming to be an activist but supporting current trendy causes only for the social status. These causes have included opposing circumcision, anti-Iraq War protests, the removal of the 10 Commandments from a courthouse, the right to die (specifically regarding her brother Buster), and awareness about graft-versus-host disease (which her husband was afflicted with due to unnecessary hair transplants).

In the last episode of season 3, it is revealed that Lindsay is not actually Michael's twin sister, or even a Bluth at all; she was adopted by the Bluth family to "stick it" to the Bluth family's rivals, the Sitwell family. She also discovers that she is 40 years old, three years older than she had previously believed herself to be. Feeling that her youthful allure has now escaped her, she becomes desperate to marry a successful man, and divulges to Michael that they are not biological siblings, hoping (with no luck) that she can seduce him.

Creator Mitchell Hurwitz came up with Lindsay as the family's politically liberal figure, but Lindsay is also meant to represent a liberal who personally benefited from her politics more than she sacrificed, due to the image she built. This motif is continued in the series' revival and fourth season, in which Lindsay travels to India in an attempt to connect to her spiritual side and then tumultuously dates Marky Bark, a genuine liberal activist, while still married to Tobias. She later unwittingly becomes the call girl of politically conservative politician Herbert Love, eventually abandoning her long-held liberal views and finally realizing her closer affinity for conservative ones. When Love falls into a coma, Lindsay at the last minute takes up his mantle in his campaign to run for U.S. Congress.

In the show's fifth season, Lindsay goes missing after no longer being able to tolerate her supposed mother's controlling attitude, but reemerges in the final scene. The season's penultimate episode reveals through a Ron Howard documentary about the Bluth family shown to the court, that Lindsay is in fact Lucille's half sister, being the daughter of Lucille's mother who put her up for adoption.

Having previously appeared in Ally McBeal, de Rossi said that she was looking for a new series like it. She was also attracted to Arrested Development for what she thought was a "fresh new perspective on comedy." She played Lindsay as someone who "doesn't have much of a clue but... has a pretty good heart." She explained her approach by saying that, "with Ally McBeal, we were very rehearsed and staged. But this is a lot looser." Hurwitz felt that de Rossi made the character somewhat similar to Lucille.

=== Gob Bluth ===
George Oscar "Gob" Bluth II (known by his initials "G.O.B.", /dʒoʊb/ JOHB; played by Will Arnett) is the oldest child of George Sr. and Lucille Bluth.

By trade a part-time magician, he is a founding member of the "Magicians' Alliance", a group that was formed to preserve magicians' secrets; however, he was later blacklisted by them for revealing such a secret in the pilot episode. He is known for incorporating over-the-top theatrics into his magic shows, including pyrotechnics, dance routines, wind machines, and Europe's "The Final Countdown", though his illusions often malfunction.

George Sr. paid little attention to Gob as a child and has no respect for him as an adult; his mother Lucille openly loathes him. Gob's desperate and unsuccessful attempts to win his father's approval and become the Bluths' "favorite" son is a major theme of his character. As Michael's older brother, Gob believes he is inherently entitled to more respect, and feels threatened and insulted by the fact that he is less successful than Michael. On several occasions, Gob and Michael realize that their rivalry has been nurtured by their father and mother's manipulations. Gob is known to be the womanizer of the Bluth family, though he often exaggerates his romantic encounters in what he believes is an intense competition with Michael (though Michael does not reciprocate these competitive feelings). In fact, Gob loves Michael more than anyone else in his family and is surprised whenever Michael does not express such feelings in return. Eventually, Gob discovers that he is the father of the teenage jock Steve Holt. Toward the end of season 1, Gob, in a series of escalating dares, marries a woman who deals in trained seals (played by Arnett's then-wife Amy Poehler). The two immediately and permanently become estranged from each other and she later becomes infatuated with Tobias Fünke, Gob's brother-in-law, and joins the army in the hopes of avoiding her attraction. A running joke throughout the series is that Gob never learns his wife's name.

Gob's character has been well received and Arnett was nominated for a number of awards for his performance as Gob including the Emmy for Outstanding Supporting Actor in a Comedy Series in 2006 as well as the Screen Actors Guild Award for Outstanding Performance by an Ensemble in a Comedy Series (shared with the entire cast).

=== George Michael Bluth ===
George Michael Bluth (also known as George-Michael Bluth during the fourth season) (born March 3, 1990; played by Michael Cera and in flashback sequences by Christian Lavery) is the son of Michael Bluth. He begins the series as a student at Balboa High School, and works at the family frozen banana stand, where he is "Mister Manager." He is straight-laced, quiet, awkward, and obedient.

He is reunited with his cousin Maeby in the first episode, and develops a crush on her after she forcibly kisses him (to teach their parents a lesson for not letting them spend more time together, although it fails because their parents are entirely oblivious to it). His nervousness around Maeby and his wrestling with his sexual emotions for her become one of the main recurring themes of the show. In the second season, he starts dating a girl named Ann, a devout Christian whom his father and Maeby dislike. Season 2 ends with George Michael and Maeby kissing, to his delight. After the incident, the two try to avoid each other for much of the third season. Later in the season, he and Maeby accidentally get married during what they believed was a fake wedding to cheer up Alzheimer's patients in a hospital in "Fakin' It".

They also kiss passionately after getting drunk off fake wine when George Michael, suspecting Maeby may be adopted, tells her they might not be related by blood. When his uncle Tobias, oblivious to their secret, proves to them both that Maeby was their naturally born daughter it becomes more cause for consternation to George Michael for the remainder of the original series until the final episode when it is revealed his aunt Lindsay was herself adopted, thus eliminating any blood ties between the two erstwhile cousins. He ultimately decides to escape to Newport by stealing his uncle Gob's boat, feeling he doesn't belong there anymore. Upon learning of Lindsay's origins, he reconciles with his father and finally reveals his feelings for Maeby. Both realizing that further contact with their dysfunctional family is more trouble than it's worth, he and Michael escape to Cabo with $500,000 and a house waiting for them, not knowing that George Senior has escaped to the same destination with the same plan. Besides his crush on his cousin, George Michael is also shown to be extremely close to his father, Michael, presumably with the two bonding more after his mother's death.

In season 4, George Michael is now in his early twenties and in college at the University of California, Irvine. He works on new software called "FakeBlock", together with his roommate Paul "P-Hound" Huan, which was initially intended to be a wood block app but, through several lies he has told, is now believed to be an anti-piracy and anti-hacking software, or "anti-social media". George Michael is dismayed when his father moves into his college dorm room with him to attend college, through an online university. It is revealed that George Michael and Maeby have agreed not to further their relationship, though their feelings are still strong for each other; however, when George Michael is assigned to tutor Maeby in mathematics, he takes the opportunity to try and seduce her, but fails. After Maeby, now desperate for money, tried to kickstart his FakeBlock business, she puts too much pressure on him (since she has lost her own job at the film studio), and his first decision with his new business is to fire her. Meanwhile, P-Hound threatens with taking legal action regarding the ownership of FakeBlock. George Michael, ultimately, under the alias "George Maharis" (also the public name of the man behind FakeBlock) begins a relationship with Rebel Alley, Ron Howard's daughter, only to find out that she is also dating his father. The father and son nearly reconcile when they realize this, but when Michael inadvertently reveals that he had known about the relationship for a while, George Michael angrily punches his father in the face.

=== Maeby Fünke ===
Mae "Maeby" Fünke (born September 22, 1990; played by Alia Shawkat) is the overlooked yet independent, sarcastic, and crafty daughter of Lindsay and Tobias. Maeby attends a progressive school before she and her parents move in with her uncle Michael. Maeby immediately becomes unmotivated and disengaged when she enters the public school system. She frequently directs her efforts at new ways to shock her woefully neglectful parents, which inadvertently turn her into a rather successful con artist. In one instance, Maeby swindles her peers out of charity money by pretending to be a disabled girl named "Surely" who suffers from a rare, debilitating illness called "B.S." In the third season, Maeby actually prospers professionally despite her academic failures, conning her way into a job as a movie executive and maintaining the charade (with astounding and increasing success) for several months. She gets fired only when George Michael sends invitations for her 16th birthday party to all the other studio executives in her address book, who suddenly realize how young she really is. Her boss, Mort Meyers, though, wants her back when he realizes what a celebrity she has become as a result of this scandal.

Many storylines featuring Maeby involve a mutual but heavily restrained sexual attraction shared with her first cousin, George Michael. Because the model home is so cramped, the two are forced to share a bedroom. This forced proximity and the American remake of "Les Cousins Dangereux" lead to their first real kiss, after which the mortified cousins start avoiding each other, though not always successfully. Maeby legally marries George Michael when a "fake" wedding ceremony to entertain Alzheimer's patients goes wrong. On her marriage certificate, her birthday is stated to be September 22, 1990. George Michael is the only character to remember Maeby's 16th birthday and arrange a celebration for her. Maeby is touched by the kindness George Michael has shown her; when George Michael explains how she may not be related to the Bluths at all, the two share a passionate kiss (and, it is mentioned, reach "second base"). In the final episode of the original run, "Development Arrested", it is confirmed that they are indeed not blood related at all (her mother, Lindsay, was actually adopted), allowing the two to be finally together, but George Michael has second thoughts after Michael explains that despite not being blood relatives, they are still family. Again, the two anguish over their doomed relationship. In the end, Maeby pitches her life story as an idea for a television show to producer Ron Howard (who is also the narrator of the series). Howard tells her that her story may be better as a movie.

Maeby's knack for unwittingly stumbling into potentially incestuous situations is a running joke throughout the series. In the second season, she sings an unintentionally provocative duet with her uncle Michael and kisses George Michael in a futile attempt to shock her parents and, similarly, kisses Annyong, her adoptive uncle, to shock George Michael. During her estrangement from George Michael, Maeby distracts herself by dating Steve Holt, who turns out to be Gob's illegitimate son and therefore another one of Maeby's first cousins. Maeby ends up slipping Steve one of Gob's "forget-me-nows" to avoid having sex while tricking Steve into thinking they had. In the season 4 revival of the series, Maeby has stayed in high school for five extra years, vowing to continue this routine until her parents finally notice. She begins a relationship with Lucille Austero's adopted son, Perfecto Telles, who she thinks is an undercover cop at the high school but is actually merely a student and whose age is young enough that her sexual relationship with him can be considered statutory rape. She is last seen being arrested on such charges.

Maeby is portrayed by Alia Shawkat. Shawkat tried out for the part with Michael Cera, who plays George Michael, in Los Angeles, and the creators thought they both did well. The two were the first to join the cast. For her role as Maeby, Shawkat won a Young Artist Award in 2005. Creator Mitchell Hurwitz named the character after his daughters Maisy and Phoebe. Hurwitz acknowledged the peculiar result of this blending, saying "It just seemed like crazy extra fun to think of weird names. I don't want us to become too self-conscious about it but, yes, we do have some strange names." Incidentally, she is often described as George Michael's "Cousin Maeby", a play on words making reference to the fact that they may not be related. Maeby was initially imagined as a pseudo-conservative, to be a deliberate foil to her activist mother Lindsay, but eventually re-imagined to be a troublemaker in other ways. In making Maeby an opposite to George Michael (she is bolder and not at all reverent towards her parents), Hurwitz thought this also contributed to the idea of George Michael and Maeby developing a romance.

=== Buster Bluth ===
Byron "Buster" Bluth (born 1973; played by Tony Hale) is the youngest son of George Sr. and Lucille, though it is later revealed that his biological father is actually George Sr.'s identical twin brother, Oscar.

As indicated by the narrator in season 2, despite being typically childish, Buster is probably more intelligent than his siblings Gob and Lindsay. He has frequent panic attacks, hates both closed and open spaces, is terrified of sheep, seals, and birds, and is wrathfully rivalrous toward his Korean-born adopted brother, Annyong. Buster demonstrates various childlike nutritional sensitivities as well: for instance, he becomes hyperactive from the sugar in juice and irritable after eating cheese; he also takes frequent naps. He has an unhealthy attachment to his domineering mother Lucille; one of the running gags throughout the series is his quasi-incestuous, Oedipal complex. For her part, Lucille won't let him go in the sun, swim in the ocean, or stand on their balcony in windy weather. George Sr. makes reference to the "claw marks" left on Lucille's womb after she gave birth to Buster. He sometimes tries to assert his independence by defying his mother's orders, as when he dates her rival, Lucille Austero. He has an alienating habit of greeting people with shoulder massages, and commonly addresses his relatives by their relation to him. (For example, Gob and Michael are greeted with "Hey, brother" and Oscar is greeted with "Hey, uncle-father Oscar". Steve Holt is greeted with "Hey, possible nephew".) Buster seems to have inherited many personality quirks from his biological father Oscar, such as his cluelessness, doughiness, and propensity to give shoulder massages. Despite his obvious personality flaws, Buster does care about the rest of his family more than many of the other Bluths, shown when he, unlike the rest of his siblings, does not sell the company stocks at Michael's request and fakes a coma so that he wouldn't have to testify against his family.

In the second-season premiere, Lucille spontaneously enlists Buster in the United States Army at the urging of a Michael Moore impersonator. Although Buster's training is poor, his possible deployment to Iraq is a recurring fear of his and his mother's. This possibility is abruptly nullified when Buster's left hand is bitten off by a "loose seal" (pun on "Lucille"), when he impulsively gets the courage to jump into the ocean one day after years of being afraid to swim. In subsequent episodes he wears a trans-radial prosthetic on his left arm that is sometimes a hook and other times a prosthetic hand.

In season 4, Buster reenlists in the Army for a sense of purpose after his mother Lucille is arrested and Lucille Austero rejects him for being unable to have a relationship rather than view her as a surrogate mother. In the Army, Buster is unwittingly made a UAV pilot (thinking he is merely playing a video game), but is "wounded" after falling out of his chair, receiving several commendations and being fitted with an oversized robotic hand that makes more powerful motions than he can control. Realizing for the first time that he has been killing people as a UAV pilot, he fakes failing his physical therapy, eventually failing the "Q Test" (cute test) in which he proves he is able to control his prosthetic when he delicately holds a kitten. After being discharged from the Army, he meets Herbert Love's wife, Ophelia, who takes pity on him and convinces her husband to let him stay with the family, suggesting he could be useful to the campaign as a poster child against wasteful government spending. She later sleeps with Buster in retaliation for photos she finds of Herbert and Lindsay, but then breaks it off with him after Herbert ends his affair and wants to make the marriage work. At Cinco de Cuatro, Buster knocks Herbert unconscious with his prosthetic hand after being told by Perfecto Telles (an anti-bullying squad member defending Maeby) that Herbert is a bully. His storyline in the fourth season ends with him being arrested for Lucille Austero's murder after being seen around the staircar where her body went missing.

In season 5, Buster is arrested for the murder of Lucille Austero. He participates in a float parade participating as an inmate. Oscar breaks Buster out of jail by escaping from the parade and leads Buster to believe that this is part of the parade and later tells him that they are on the run from the police and must remain in hiding. Buster is not told that he has already been cleared for release from jail after the charges against him were dropped because of a lack of evidence, namely Lucille Austero's body was not found. He later reveals that he figured out that he was not on the run from the police. At the end of season 5, a cement wall used by GOB for a magic trick is broken open where Buster had placed a mannequin. When the wall is broken open, Lucille Austero's body falls out while the entire Bluth family looks at Buster who finally confesses that he did it; he murdered Lucille Austero and says that she reminds him of his own mother.

Entertainment Weekly selected Buster as the uncle for "The Perfect TV Family".

=== Tobias Fünke ===
Tobias Onyango Fünke (/ˈfjuːŋkeɪ/ FYOON-kay; played by David Cross) is the husband of Lindsay, father of Maeby Fünke, and uncle of George Michael Bluth. He was the chief resident of psychiatry at Massachusetts General Hospital until he lost his license for giving CPR to a man who was not actually having a heart attack. At one point, he was licensed as both an analyst and a therapist, supposedly making him the first licensed "analrapist" (/əˈnælrəpɪst/ ə-NAL-rə-pist), which he later changes to "theralyst". Tobias is very fond of awkwardly rolling or somersaulting into and out of certain situations mainly to show his supposedly catlike agility and balance, though this often backfires.

At the beginning of the series, Tobias decides that his destiny is to become an actor, and he pursues this career throughout the series with very little success. Highlights of his "career" include being turned down for the role of "Dr. House"; landing the part of "frightened inmate number two" in a prison film, only to get fired for not being able to do the shower scene due to his never-nude condition (see below); portraying George Sr. in the poorly narrated series, Scandalmakers; and attempting to join the Blue Man Group as a standby understudy and, as a consequence, spending part of the second season covered in blue make-up. In a move inspired by the film Mrs. Doubtfire, Tobias masquerades as a British housekeeper/nanny named "Mrs. Featherbottom" in an attempt to spend time with his wife and daughter after Lindsay kicks him out of the model house. While the disguise fools no one, the family humors him since this gets the housework done. In season 4, he receives an audition for The Big Bang Theory, but never hears the answering machine message saying so.

Tobias suffers from "never-nude" syndrome (which, as the narrator states, is "exactly what it sounds like") and wears denim cut-off shorts under his underwear (and underneath that, a tube sock) at all times in order to avoid anyone (including himself and his wife) seeing his genitalia. The condition is similar to severe gymnophobia, although it is portrayed humorously. In the episode "In God We Trust", he attempts to reach out to his nephew George Michael during his tenure in the "Adam" muscle-suit for the "Living Classics Pageant" mistakenly assuming they have the same phobia (in reality, George Michael is trying to impress his cousin, Maeby). He conquers this for a time in the middle of Season 1, but after a close-up picture of his genitalia is shown on the evening news (where it has been mistaken for a photo showing evidence of WMDs in Iraq), he is driven back to the cut-offs.

Although he is heterosexual, he has said many things that make people question his sexuality. The hints come in the form of subtle innuendos and sexual double-entendres, to which he seems completely oblivious. In season 2, Michael advises him to record what he says for a day, after which Tobias acknowledges that he is a "blowhard" (in "Ready, Aim, Marry Me!"). Lindsay, who married Tobias to spite her parents, is convinced that her husband is gay. His self-help book, The Man Inside Me, is a success, though only in the gay community, due to the fact that he replaced all gender-related pronouns with only male pronouns, to avoid confusion. He has experienced sexual difficulties with his wife. This leads to their joint decision to try an "open" marriage, even though Tobias himself acknowledges that this path never works. Tobias doesn't really follow through with the "open relationship", and often stalks his wife covered in Blue Man Group blue paint, following her around on her attempted dates hiding in areas that are blue in color in order to remain unseen. Although he continually takes very expensive acting lessons from Carl Weathers, he mainly gets tips on frugality from Mr. Weathers. Lindsay continually pokes fun at Tobias's desperation to become an actor, and they split up and reconcile many times over the course of the series.

As of season 4, Tobias is also a registered sex offender in Orange County, California after inadvertently appearing on "To Entrap a Local Predator", a pedophile sting operation hosted by John Beard, similar to Dateline NBC's To Catch a Predator. Eager to see his daughter and remove his rock monster costume, Tobias enters the house and proclaims, "Is there a little girl here all by herself?" and equally incriminating, "Daddy needs to get his rocks off." Tobias drives a Volkswagen Cabriolet with a vanity plate intended to say "A New Start!", which is abbreviated as "ANUSTART". This becomes a recurring nickname in season four. During this season, he falls in love with the hardcore drug addict and recovering actress DeBrie Bardeaux (Maria Bamford).

The Russo brothers asked Cross to make a cameo appearance as Tobias in their 2018 superhero film Avengers: Infinity War, but he was unavailable for filming; however, Tobias can still be seen in the film as one of the alien Collector's specimens, played instead by an uncredited extra covered in blue paint.

=== George Bluth Sr. ===
George Oscar Bluth Sr. (born August 25, 1947; portrayed by Jeffrey Tambor and in flashback sequences during season four by Seth Rogen, and in sequences from the in-show production “Making a Murderer” during season five by Taran Killam, called "Pop-Pop" by his grandchildren, is the husband of Lucille Bluth, and father of Gob, Lindsay, Michael, and Buster (and, much later, the adopted Annyong). George Sr. was born in Cleveland, Ohio. He was the original CEO of the Bluth Company, which he founded; however, after years of "creative accounting" practices, he became the subject of an investigation by the U.S. Securities and Exchange Commission and was imprisoned or in hiding during the first three seasons of the show.

While in prison, George Sr. continues to try to exert control over the company, often using his son Gob to undermine his more competent son Michael's authority. At the end of season 1, George Sr. escapes to Mexico with a briefcase filled with evidence of his dealings with Saddam Hussein in Iraq. In season 2, George Sr. fakes his death in Mexico and returns to America to hide in the attic of the Bluth model home. Early in season 3, after being discovered among the Blue Man Group in Reno, Nevada, he is placed under house arrest. He tells Michael that he has been set up to build homes in Iraq by a group of British contractors operating out of "Wee Britain" in Orange County, California, but ultimately admits that he may be guilty of "light treason." By the end of the series, however, it is revealed that he is under the control of his wife, Lucille, and that the CIA have in fact set him up as a "patsy". He escapes to Cabo with Michael and George Michael following the party at the conclusion of season 3. In season 4, George Sr. and Lucille pretend to be separated while he establishes a sham sweat lodge for wealthy CEOs on the border of Mexico, while planning his larger project of building a wall on the border of Mexico and the US, with the support of politician Herbert Love. His separation with Lucille becomes a real one when she realizes he has been appeasing her sexual needs by swapping himself with his identical twin brother, Oscar; Lucille consequently announces her desire for an actual divorce.

Before the events of the show, George Sr. was also the inventor of the Cornballer, a faulty product which has been banned in numerous countries. He has a religious awakening twice on the show, once becoming Jewish after a period of isolation and selling a video series entitled "Caged Wisdom", and once becoming a devout Christian after reading a pamphlet in a garbage bag while hiding in the attic.

=== Lucille Bluth ===
Lucille Bluth (née Jenkins; played by Jessica Walter, in flashback sequences during season four by Kristen Wiig, and in sequences from the in-show production “Making a Murderer” during season five by Cobie Smulders) is the matriarch of the Bluth family. She is the mother of Gob, Michael, Buster, and the adoptive mother of Lindsay and Hel-loh "Annyong" Bluth, as well as wife to George Sr. Her grandchildren are George Michael Bluth, Maeby Fünke, and Steve Holt (Gob's son), with the former two affectionately calling her "Gangie" /ˈɡæŋɡi/. She carries on an affair with George Sr.'s identical twin brother Oscar.

Lucille is accustomed to an opulent and decadent lifestyle, which she funds with misappropriated Bluth Company money. She treats herself to repeated spa treatments and face lifts, and is known to abuse alcohol and prescription drugs. She is condescending and verbally abusive towards her long-suffering housekeepers, and she has never made eye contact with a waiter. Lucille is extremely manipulative, narcissistic, amoral, domineering, and emotionally abusive to her children—some more than others. She furtively wrests control of the Bluth Company board from Michael. She has a tight emotional grip on her youngest son Buster, who, as a result of his mother's dominance and sheltering, is unstable, socially inept, and prone to panic attacks. She frequently insinuates that her daughter Lindsay is fat and lazy, and makes no attempt to hide her dislike for Gob. She repeatedly lies to her children to keep them fighting amongst themselves, fearing they will turn on her if they are getting along. In the finale, George Sr. reveals that she is the mastermind behind the Bluth Company's illegal actions.

At the end of season 3, Lucille makes a run from the SEC on board the Queen Mary, after Annyong turns in evidence against her. The ship consequently capsizes and she is arrested in season 4. Due to negligence or sudden excuses, none of the rest of Lucille's family ends up attending her trial. She is sent to a country-club-like prison for women, where her prison identification number is "07734" (which upside down reads "hELLo", a reference to Annyong's real name).

=== Narrator ===
The Narrator (voiced by executive producer Ron Howard, who went uncredited in the role for the first three seasons) narrates much of the Bluth family's lives, and often interjects quick explanatory (and sometimes humorous) comments before, after, or while characters speak. He frequently brings up past footage to illustrate his points, and along with the cameramen can be excluded from the events of the story at times, in the style of a documentary narrator. The Narrator's personal feelings often inform his narration, for example in the episode "Spring Breakout", the narrator repeatedly criticizes the narrator of the television show Scandalmakers for having no talent and paying no heed to facts. Likewise, Howard's own career is occasionally referenced. In the season 1 episode "Public Relations", the publicist Jessie insultingly calls George Michael "Opie" (Howard's character on The Andy Griffith Show) to which the Narrator responds "Jessie had gone too far, and had best watch her mouth." In the season 3 episode "S.O.B.s", he begs the audience to "please tell your friends about this show" after George says that begging is "sometimes… the only way to stay in the game." The narrator has implied that he knows Maeby from her time as a studio executive. In season 4, Maeby receives a lifetime achievement award at a ceremony called "The Opie Awards", on which the narrator comments that "it's nice to have an award named after you".

== Secondary characters ==
=== Ann Veal ===
Ann Paul Veal (primarily played by Mae Whitman) was the on-again/off-again girlfriend of George-Michael Bluth, even though their relationship was little more than his means of distracting himself from Maeby. Her first appearance was in the episode "Let 'Em Eat Cake", where she was played by Alessandra Torresani. In every subsequent appearance, she was portrayed by Mae Whitman.

She comes from an extremely religious family, and her father (played by Alan Tudyk) is a pastor. In "Meat the Veals", Ann's mother (played by Ione Skye) kisses Michael, which she believes to be making love to him. The kiss leads to a brawl between Michael and her husband at the end of the episode.

With the exception of George-Michael, the Bluths all struggle to remember Ann's name. In the high school yearbook, she is identified as "Not Pictured" under her photograph, although they did print a retraction in the spring supplement. Michael disapproves of his son's relationship with Ann, believing his son to be setting his dating standards too low, and refers to her variously (and always accidentally) as "Bland", "Egg", "Annabel", "Yam", "Ham", "Plant", "Plain", and "Ann Hog". He once abandons her in Mexico accidentally. Maeby takes pleasure in referring to Ann as "Bland". George-Michael tells Maeby that Ann is "not bland" when forced to defend his love interest.

Ann is attracted to George-Michael's Star Wars kid-like lightsaber demonstration, which leads to their reconciliation after a breakup midway through the second season. George-Michael wanted to get pre-engaged to Ann at the end of the second season, lost his resolve at the last moment, and was then asked by Ann to teach her his secular ways.

Ann's strict conservatism serves as a foil for Maeby's commitment to rebellion. Ann leads the protest at Maeby's premiere of the English remake of Dangerous Cousins, originally a French movie about a sexual relationship between two cousins.

Ann moves on from George-Michael after coming in third place in an "Inner Beauty" pageant. Gob, who admits a penchant for third-place pageant winners, later reveals that he is dating a Christian girl, who eventually turns out to be Ann.

In season 4, Ann and Gob get engaged after he takes her virginity, but she decides to break up with him after he botches a magic trick that ruins their wedding. Shortly after, Tony Wonder sleeps with and impregnates Ann when she is vulnerable. Several years later, after she has her baby, Ann tricks Wonder into sleeping with Gob to get revenge on both of them.

Appears In:

- Played by Alessandra Torresani – "Let 'Em Eat Cake"
- Played by Mae Whitman – "The One Where They Build a House", "¡Amigos!", "Good Grief", "Afternoon Delight", "Switch Hitter", "Burning Love", "Out on a Limb", "The Immaculate Election", "Meat the Veals", "Righteous Brothers", "Notapusy", "Development Arrested", "Colony Collapse", "A New Attitude", "Señoritis"

=== Annyong Bluth ===
Hel-loh "Annyong" Bluth (Justin Lee) is the adopted Korean son of Lucille and George Sr.

Lucille adopts Annyong midway through the first season in order to teach Buster a lesson. Apparently knowing no English, the youth greets his adoptive family by saying "annyong" (안녕), the Korean word for "hello." When they repeat the word, so does he. This causes Lucille to assume his name is "Annyong". Annyong is often neglected and finds himself in conflict with Buster. He also develops a crush on Maeby in the season one finale after she kisses him to make George Michael jealous. He is apparently sent to the Milford School (a school where students' silence is encouraged) by Lucille, who is attempting to teach him a lesson that she does not even remember. She never hears from him at the school and, apparently, she promptly forgets his existence altogether. Annyong returns only much later in the series; he is found to be hiding in the walls of Lucille's apartment with mysteriously obtained surveillance equipment. In the third-season finale it is revealed that Hel-loh (meaning "One Day" in Korean, finally revealing his name after his usual greeting of "Annyong", prompting further ironic confusion among the Bluths) orchestrated the second SEC raid on the Bluth Company. He explains that his grandfather "one day" promised vengeance upon the Bluths, revealing that his grandfather originated the banana stand idea which the Bluths stole (thus launching the Bluth corporate empire while leaving the grandfather penniless) before Lucille quietly arranged the grandfather's deportation. Now Annyong has come to the United States, patiently waiting to avenge his grandfather by financially ruining the Bluths: sneaking his way into their family and reporting their corporate misdoings to the SEC. This act of revenge at the end of season 3 causes Lucille to attempt to flee the SEC aboard the Queen Mary. She is imprisoned for this in season 4, during which Annyong makes only one brief cameo appearance, spitefully trying to charge an expensive food item to the Bluth account, only for it to be declined to his horror.

His actual name, "하루", means "a single day" in Korean, but is more accurately romanized as Haru or Halu as opposed to "Hel-loh."

Appears in: "Shock and Aww", "Staff Infection", "Justice Is Blind", "Missing Kitty", "Best Man for the GOB", "Not Without My Daughter", "Let 'Em Eat Cake", "The One Where Michael Leaves", "¡Amigos!", "Mr. F", "Development Arrested", "Red Hairing"

=== Barry Zuckerkorn ===
Barry Zuckerkorn is the sluggish and bumbling attorney for the Bluth family. He is played by Henry Winkler, with Max Winkler playing the younger Zuckerkorn in flashbacks.

Zuckerkorn represents George Sr., the family patriarch, who has been arrested and charged with defrauding investors, and "light treason" (George Bluth Sr., had built homes in Iraq with Saddam Hussein). Zuckerkorn often appears languid and distracted in his handling of the case. Unfortunately for the Bluth family, he does not seem particularly adept in the courtroom.

He is invariably ill-prepared, which he usually blames on long meetings the night before. In fact, most of his nights are spent hanging out at rest stops, a behavior that is frequently mentioned and accompanied by a fast cut to an establishing shot of a dark, shady rest-stop facility. In addition, he had not caught up with the status of George Sr.'s case and comments that he went on a date with "a woman who works two jobs", cutting to images of his mugshots (implying he attempted to hook up with a prostitute that was actually an undercover cop).

His sexual leanings are ambiguous although it appears that he may prefer the company of male transvestite prostitutes; it is possible that he is outwardly homophobic (often making mildly negative references and comments about "the homosexuals" and then regretting his comments) while secretly homosexual. Like Tobias Fünke, Barry makes many colorful references that seem to allude to his exclusive attraction to men. They aren't explicit enough, however, to be conclusive. He has been with the Bluths for a long time and was kept only because Lucille considers him to be "part of the family." His reputation is stronger with the elder Bluths than with the children.

Despite his parents' dependence on Barry, Michael Bluth fired him on the first episode of the third season, which ended his law career (as the Bluth family was his only client). Since then, he has been acting as a transvestite prostitute, and Lindsay seeing her husband Tobias retaining Barry's "services" has prompted her to seek a divorce. Zuckerkorn was replaced as the Bluths' attorney by Bob Loblaw, but returned to represent them following the events of "Development Arrested".

Appears in: "In God We Trust", "Beef Consommé", "Altar Egos", "Justice Is Blind", "Not Without My Daughter", "Let 'Em Eat Cake", "The One Where Michael Leaves", "Good Grief", "Sad Sack", "Queen for a Day", "Out on a Limb", "Hand to God", "Motherboy XXX", "Righteous Brothers", "The Cabin Show", "Flight of the Phoenix"

=== Kitty Sanchez ===
Kitty Sanchez (Judy Greer) is George Bluth Sr.'s fiercely loyal and independent assistant.

Kitty maintained a long-term affair with George Sr. and a fevered yet brief liaison with Gob, despite the fact he is disgusted by her. After George Sr. was imprisoned, Kitty stayed on to work for Michael.

Despite her intense loyalty to George Sr., she did not demonstrate the same toward Michael. Michael finally got fed up and fired her, but Kitty and Michael's father both insisted he didn't have that power, the latter of whom insisting, upon Michael's observation on her sanity, that, "You don't fire crazy." Michael attempted to rehire Kitty, but her obstinacy forced him to immediately fire her again. Kitty subsequently vanished with potentially damaging information concerning her sexual history with her boss. In actuality, she did not disappear, but was working with the police in an effort to gain control of the Bluth company. After arranging a meeting with Michael, she inadvertently admitted that she had proof that George Sr. had built homes overseas without paying taxes. Michael downplayed the importance of the revelation and Kitty dropped out of sight.

Kitty re-emerged in "Let 'Em Eat Cake" to rescue George Sr. from the hospital. They escaped to Mexico together but were separated again when he was pronounced dead. Kitty caught up with him in "Spring Breakout" and blackmailed him into staying with her, and giving her the son he had promised her (prompting George Sr. to comment, "Never promise crazy a baby"). Michael and Gob managed to rescue their father while Lucille had a showdown with her rival. The Bluth matriarch put her years of alcohol abuse to good use by besting Kitty in a drinking contest. Seemingly defeated, the hung over mistress returned to her hotel room to discover the Bluths had inadvertently left behind the ransom she'd been asking for: "250cc's of George Sr." in a cooler.

Kitty returned later, claiming she had reformed, gotten into AA, and even has a famous sponsor. She won't say who it is, but she drops some pretty obvious hints of it being an ex-Night Court star; ("It's not Bull. It's not Harry Anderson. And he's white."), a reference to actor John Larroquette as show creator Mitchell Hurwitz was once a writer for The John Larroquette Show, and Larroquette himself is a recovering alcoholic. At the end of Season 2 she and Tobias, the state of his marriage still up in the air, had jetted off to Reno, Nevada so he could pursue a plum spot in the Blue Man Group. As we learn in season 3, the part has already been taken by George Sr., who then proceeds to steal Kitty from his son-in-law as well. A final reference to Kitty is made when Tobias masquerades as her in an effort to win back Lindsay's affection.

Kitty has the habit of attempting to bribe people with sexual appeal by baring her breasts, usually with the comment, "Take a good look, 'cuz it's the last time you're gonna see these" or "say goodbye to these, Michael." Michael's reaction tends to be one of vague horror, and based on his claim to have seen "seven nipples" in one day after witnessing Gob and Kitty exposing their chests, Kitty may have had botched plastic surgery. She has herpes, as Gob reveals in "Righteous Brothers".

In season 4, Kitty works for Imagine Entertainment, where she continues to undermine Michael. She had previously sabotaged Maeby's career in the film business.

Appears in: "Charity Drive", "Visiting Ours", "Missing Kitty", "Not Without My Daughter", "Let 'Em Eat Cake", "The One Where They Build a House", "¡Amigos!", "Spring Breakout", "Righteous Brothers", "The Cabin Show"

=== Lucille Austero ===
Lucille Austero (Liza Minnelli), often referred by members of the Bluth family as "Lucille 2", is the friend, neighbor, and chief social rival of Lucille Bluth.

Lucille Austero lives in the apartment next to Lucille and Buster Bluth in the Balboa Towers. In season 1, she and Buster end up dating after an incident at a country club auction when Buster bids on the wrong Lucille. Their relationship is looked down upon by the other Bluths. Her chronic case of vertigo often causes some difficulty for the klutzy Buster.

In season 2, she becomes the majority shareholder of the Bluth company after the family members sell their shares. To ensure the company's safety, Gob romances Lucille, who in turn names Gob the president of the Bluth Company in place of Michael. Although continuously stating that he is disgusted by her, it is seen in various clips that he is in fact infatuated with Lucille 2. Buster at the time is dating Starla, the Bluth Company receptionist. After learning his older brother is dating his ex-girlfriend, Buster leaves Starla to pursue Lucille. Eventually, Lucille leaves both of them for Stan Sitwell.

By season 4, Lucille 2 has come into control of the Bluth Company (now the Austero Bluth Company) after the entire family sells their stocks, and the season ends with Lucille 2 mysteriously going missing, leaving only a bloody scene during the Cinco de Cuatro festivities. Buster is arrested for her (suspected) murder. Throughout the season, she is shown to aggravate the majority of the Bluth family with her political and business plans, making the circumstances of her disappearance ambiguous.

In the last episode of season 5, a cement wall used by Gob for a magic trick is broken open where Buster had placed a mannequin. When the wall is broken open, Lucille Austero's body falls out while the entire Bluth family looks at Buster who finally confesses that he did it; He murdered Lucille Austero and says that she reminds him of his own mother.

Appears in: "Key Decisions", "Charity Drive", "My Mother, The Car", "In God We Trust", "Storming the Castle", "Pier Pressure", "Marta Complex", "Queen for a Day", "Burning Love", "Ready, Aim, Marry Me!", "Flight of the Phoenix", "The B. Team", "A New Start", "Double Crossers", "Red Hairing", "Smashed", "Queen B.", "A New Attitude", "Señoritis", "Blockheads"

=== Lupe ===
Lupe (B.W. Gonzalez) is Lucille Bluth's Hispanic housekeeper. Lucille is frequently abusive towards her. Lupe, and at one time the rest of her family, has been tricked into working for other members of the Bluth family (specifically Lindsay) on a number of occasions. In the second season, Lucille fires Lupe when she catches her in bed with Buster (whom Lupe refers to as "retardo" in "¡Amigos!"), comforting him about the loss of his hand. Lupe is replaced by a robotic vacuum cleaner (specifically a Roomba), which is also caught in bed with Buster. Lupe returns as the family housekeeper without explanation in season 3, and appears very briefly as one of the women posing as Lucille and Lindsay in rehab. Lupe is the sister of Luz (played by Lillian Hurst), Lucille's original maid who was fired for supposedly taking a day off to take her daughter to the hospital.

Appears in: "Charity Drive", "In God We Trust", "Public Relations", "Marta Complex", "Staff Infection", "Missing Kitty", "Best Man for the Gob", "¡Amigos!", "The Immaculate Election", "For British Eyes Only", "Exit Strategy"

=== Oscar Bluth ===
Jeffrey Tambor as Oscar Bluth

Oscar George Bluth (Jeffrey Tambor) is George Sr.'s identical twin.

Oscar can usually be distinguished from the balding George by his flowing "lion's mane" hair, apparently due to lack of stress in his life. He is a frequent user of marijuana. He served as a "croc spotter" on a swift boat in the Vietnam War (yelling out "Croc!" whenever he saw a crocodile), and once wrote a song for David Cassidy, "All You Need Are Smiles", that made Joan Baez call him "the shallowest man in the world." In season 2 it is revealed that he is Buster's father, which he makes frequent and heavy-handed references to, but Buster only realizes the truth through an unintentional turn of phrase. Oscar resides most often in a trailer outside Camp Pendleton. He owns about 200 acres (81 ha) of lemon groves and sells lemonade to the troops when their maneuvers pass by. He sells the land to Michael, who is unaware that the government has an easement on it so they can drive their tanks through it. Lucille takes advantage of Oscar's feelings for her and convinces him to buy the land back.

According to Michael, Oscar has lived on handouts all his life. According to his brother, he has never had to work for a living, leading to his full head of shoulder-length hair that Lucille finds irresistible. Oscar's persistence with Lucille—whom he met when she was working a USO tour—leads to a rekindling of their once torrid romance. This disturbs Buster, who discovers the adulterous pair in flagrante delicto multiple times. After George Sr. escapes confinement, Oscar is arrested because police assume he is George. The police also impound Oscar's trailer, leaving him even more indigent than usual. Lucille allows him to live with her and Buster. Oscar's presence allows Buster to develop the many talents he'd discovered with Lucille. He lovingly brushes Oscar's hair, a ritual once reserved for Lucille. In return, Buster is treated to several uncomfortable silences upon witnessing Oscar's penchant for living loose and literally, "letting it all hang out." Oscar's shameless exhibitionism is a product of the proximity he shares with his dream woman. Once confined to a single residence, the illicit pair revive the past.

In the second-season finale, to clear up his legal difficulties and punish his brother for cuckolding him, George Sr. shaves Oscar's head and turns him in. The stress of being imprisoned and mistaken for George Sr. causes Oscar's hair to not grow back. This, paired with the fact that his fingerprints have been burned off by the family Cornballer, prevents him from establishing his identity. To convince the world of his true identity, Oscar sets up www.imoscar.com, a blog of sorts that details his life in prison while continually asserting that he is Oscar. A real-life version of the site was maintained by Fox Broadcasting until mid-2006.

In the third season, Oscar manages to get out of prison when George Sr. is placed under house arrest and leaves town. He returns occasionally, but these visits are usually ended when George Sr. knocks him out and switches places so he can escape again. In the series finale, George invites Oscar to the Bluth Company function to unwittingly take his place, a fact Oscar learns as soon as Lucille refers to him as George ("Oh God Oscar! When are you going to learn there's no such thing as free shrimp!") Oscar again plays a larger role in the fourth (revival) season, where he and his brother continually switch identities to defraud wealthy CEOs looking for spiritual enlightenment in the desert between California and Mexico.

Appears in: "Whistler's Mother", "Not Without My Daughter", "The One Where Michael Leaves", "The One Where They Build a House", "¡Amigos!", "Good Grief", "Sad Sack", "Afternoon Delight", "Switch Hitter", "Queen for a Day", "Burning Love", "Out on a Limb", "Hand to God", "Sword of Destiny", "Meat the Veals", "Spring Breakout", "Righteous Brothers", "The Cabin Show", "Prison Break-In", "Development Arrested"

=== Steve Holt ===
Steve Holt (Justin Grant Wade) is a senior (taking the year for the third time) and football star at the high school George Michael and Maeby attend, who often shouts his name, "Steve Holt!", while pumping his fists in the air.

Described as a "moron jock" by George Michael and "basically a young Gob" by Michael, Steve Holt portrays Beatrice when Tobias bungles the school's production of Much Ado About Nothing, briefly dates Lindsay (after Maeby convinces him that Lindsay is transsexual), and is student body president for four years (he declines a fifth term in order to concentrate on finding his real father). His campaign posters often read "Volt for Steve Holt." The crowd at his re-election rally can be heard chanting "Four more years."

In the season 2 episode "The Immaculate Election", it is revealed that Steve Holt is the son of Gob Bluth and Eve Holt (Charleigh Harmon Stelly), the product of one of Gob's many one-night stands in high school. Before realizing that she is supposedly a blood-relation, Steve has a brief relationship with his cousin, Maeby, which results in his being given a roofie to avoid any kind of intimacy. After learning of his parentage, he bonds with both his father and "Uncle Mike". He has worked as a gift-basket delivery boy, boil-in-bag meal delivery boy, Bluth Banana Stand employee, and cameraman for his father's magic act.

In season 4, Steve Holt is slightly overweight and balding, and works in pest control. He wishes to reconnect with his father and run a father-son business, but he is again left alone.

Appears in: "Bringing Up Buster", "Shock And Aww", "Sad Sack", "Burning Love", "The Immaculate Election", "The Cabin Show", "For British Eyes Only", "Forget-Me-Now", "Notapusy", "Making a Stand"

=== Tony Wonder ===
Tony Wonder (Ben Stiller) is a professional magician who commonly works at the Gothic Castle and is known for baking himself into a loaf of bread and emerging. Many of his tricks are direct mocking references to David Blaine. He has a tendency to make dramatic entrances when the word "wonder" is spoken, and the narrator mentions this makes it difficult for him to hide during a conversation when "wonder" is spoken.

Gob idolizes Wonder, but he believes that he came up with the idea for being baked into food first (he had the idea of being boiled into a chowder ten months earlier). As a result, Gob (a pitiful magician in comparison) believes Tony Wonder to be his greatest rival. Tony Wonder has a "W" for a goatee, and seems to specialize in illusions featuring food. He is also producing a DVD, which he dubbed "Use Your Allusion 2" after discovering his preferred title, Use Your Illusion, was unavailable due to copyright issues. Gob claims in season 3 that Tony Wonder lost a testicle to a live dove in his pants.

Tony Wonder returns in the season 4 series revival, in which he pretends to be a no-longer-closeted gay man, in order to seduce Gob for information-gathering purposes. Gob in turn attempts to seduce Tony for similarly deceptive reasons. Instead, the two begin to actually feel a mutually romantic connection and even have sex, though they both wear ridiculous masks.

Appears in: "Good Grief" (photo only), "Sword of Destiny", "S.O.B.s", Colony Collapse, A New Attitude, Blockheads (voice), Emotional Baggage, Premature Independence, The Fallout.

== Other recurring characters ==
=== Throughout the series ===
==== Bob Loblaw ====
Bob Loblaw (played by Scott Baio) is the new family attorney, replacing Barry Zuckerkorn.

Bob Loblaw first appears in the third episode of season 3, claiming this is not the first time he's been brought in to replace Barry, and that he can do anything Barry can do, plus skew younger, alluding to Baio's experience with Henry Winkler (Zuckerkorn) on the 1970s sitcom Happy Days. Contrasting Zuckerkorn's incompetence, Loblaw is a no-nonsense attorney who is always in the company of his stenographer, and frequently overbills.

He advertises his services with slogans such as "Why should you go to jail for a crime someone else noticed?" and "You don't need double talk; you need Bob Loblaw." As is evidenced by this, his name is meant to sound like "blah-blah-blah". Underneath his commercial advertisement is the phrase "Bob Loblaw No Habla Español".

Adding to the tongue twister-like aspect of the character's name, the third-season episode "S.O.B.s" includes a newspaper headline that reads "Bob Loblaw Lobs Law Bomb" and later in the season "Bob Loblaw Launches Law Blog" (viz. The Bob Loblaw Law Blog).

He has a daughter named Hope.

Appears in: "Forget-Me-Now", "Notapusy", "Mr. F", "Making a Stand"

==== Carl Weathers ====
Actor Carl Weathers portrays himself as a thrifty, mooching Hollywood movie star whom Tobias hires to teach him his craft.

Tobias meets Carl Weathers on an air porter destined for Los Angeles International Airport. Tobias once traveled to San Francisco to attend Carl Weathers' stage-fighting workshop. The actor failed to show because, as he informed Tobias, he was bumped from the flight. However, he discovered that they pay $300 to people who are inconvenienced in this manner. Carl Weathers called this "a crazy loophole in the system that the wrong guy discovered." Ever since then, Carl Weathers has been getting himself deliberately bumped from flights and subsequently cashing in.

Carl Weathers does not enjoy paying very much for anything. He is obsessed with thrift, exemplified by his claims that he acquires all of his cars from police auctions and his seeming obsession with "getting a stew going" using leftover pieces of food. He takes Tobias on as a client and is thereby introduced to the Bluth experience. Lucille Bluth uses Carl Weathers to get back at her youngest son, Buster, who has become involved romantically with her chief rival, Lucille Austero. She simply introduces Carl Weathers to Lucille 2 and suggests that they should have dinner together with Buster. Buster, however, reminds his mother that he has class that day. Lucille suggests that Carl Weathers and Lucille 2 would just have to dine alone, in that case. When Buster finally decides to move in with Lucille II, he discovers her and Carl Weathers "getting a stew going" and is greatly disturbed.

In the episode "Motherboy XXX", Weathers meets with Tobias at Burger King, and explains he is directing an episode of Scandalmakers and needs Tobias to sign over the rights for the story of his family. The whole scene satirizes product placement, as Burger King is a major sponsor of both the real Arrested Development and the fictitious Scandalmakers. Weathers joyfully remarks that all soft drink refills at Burger King are totally free. Tobias praises Burger King as "a wonderful restaurant", of which narrator Ron Howard agrees.

At one point, Weathers appears dressed to play the role of ICE in the Scandalmakers documentary.

Years later, Michael enlists Weathers to appear as himself in a movie to be based on Michael's life.

Appears in: "Public Relations", "Marta Complex", "Motherboy XXX", "The B. Team"

==== Doctor Fishman ====
Doctor Fishman (also called Doctor "Wordsmith" and the Literal Doctor; played by Ian Roberts) is a doctor who has a tendency to be too literal in his pronouncements. He has, for example, said that Buster would be "all right", when he lost his left hand. Also, that "it looks like he's dead", when he in fact means that Tobias (covered at the time in blue paint) literally looks as if he is dead, but is in fact alive, and that it "looked like they'd lost" George Sr. when he'd actually escaped through the window. His frequent misleading statements anger the Bluth family after several visits, and Lucille claims in season 4 that this tendency has caused him to constantly move hospitals.

Appears in: "Let 'Em Eat Cake", "The One Where Michael Leaves", "Hand to God", "Sword of Destiny"

==== Gene Parmesan ====
Gene Parmesan (Martin Mull) is a mediocre private detective occasionally hired by Lucille Bluth. Despite his professional incompetence, he is shown to be a master of quick-change. She hires him to find George Sr. in the second-season episode, "¡Amigos!". Parmesan always reports to Lucille by approaching her in a disguise and then dramatically revealing himself; Lucille screams in delight every time, and never recognizes him. He is highly regarded as one of the best detectives by Lucille but is said in the narration, however, to be "far from the best".

The episode "Out on a Limb" has Michael talking briefly to Gene on his cellphone, having hired him to investigate Maggie.

Appears In: "¡Amigos!", "Queen B.", "A New Attitude", "Off the Hook"

==== J. Walter Weatherman ====
J. Walter Weatherman (Steve Ryan) is a one-armed man used by George Bluth to frighten his children into good behavior.

Weatherman is a former employee of George Sr. who lost one arm in a Bluth Company construction accident. George Sr. recruited Weatherman repeatedly to fake accidents in which he loses his "arm" (a fake arm and blood) due to misbehavior from the young Bluth children. The lesson ends with J. Walter turning to the children and saying "and that's why you ...", finishing the sentence with whatever action George Sr. is trying to promote. Examples include: leaving notes and not yelling. When Michael asks his father put him in touch with Weatherman to teach George Michael a lesson, George Sr. tells him that he "killed him when he left the door open with the air conditioner on." (a reference to an unseen 'lesson') This is shown to be untrue when George Sr. hires Weatherman back to teach Michael a lesson about teaching lessons to his son. Buster later uses the same trick on both Michael and George Sr. as well as Gob, using his fake hand, to teach them a lesson about not using amputees to teach lessons.

Appears in: "Pier Pressure", "Motherboy XXX" (archived), "Making a Stand"

==== John Beard ====
John Beard (himself) is the news anchor for the fictional Fox 6 news station, which often covers the Bluth family's problems on the news, and in one case ("Missing Kitty") almost became "part of the story". His announcements of news stories often end with "what that means for your weekend", regardless of whether the story would actually affect the general public's weekend. Beard was news anchor at KTTV, the real-life Fox affiliate for Los Angeles, at the time the show was on Fox; during the first season on Netflix, he was working at WGRZ (an NBC affiliate) in Buffalo, New York and would commute between Buffalo and Los Angeles for filming.

Appears in: "Pilot", "Top Banana", "Key Decisions", "Public Relations", "Missing Kitty", "Let 'Em Eat Cake", "The One Where Michael Leaves", "The One Where They Build a House", "Sad Sack", "Burning Love", "Sword of Destiny", "The Cabin Show", "For British Eyes Only", "Mr. F", "S.O.B.s", "Flight of the Phoenix"

==== Mort Meyers ====
Mort Meyers (Jeff Garlin) is a studio executive who works with Maeby. Although he has a wife, Mort often hits on Maeby, believing that she is older than she really is.

Appears in: "Switch Hitter", "Queen for a Day", "Sword of Destiny", "Spring Breakout", "Righteous Brothers", "Mr. F", "Making a Stand", "Development Arrested"

==== Officers Taylor and Carter ====
Officers Taylor (Jay Johnston) and David Carter (Jerry Minor), are two police officers who frequently appear, memorably at George Bluth's hearings, and at the Bluth Company in search of Kitty Sanchez after her disappearance. They, like Michael Bluth, practice bring-your-daughter-to-work day, mentioning their daughters as named Tammy and Monica who are unseen, having apparently run off (demonstrating their lack of good attention, implying their incompetence in their search mission for Kitty). They are revealed to be a gay couple in the episode "Hand to God", in which lawyer Maggie Lizer pretends to be pregnant, having hired her to have their baby. The baby is in fact carried by Maggie's pregnant client, who gives birth to the child later in the episode.

Appears in: "Missing Kitty", "Not Without My Daughter", "The One Where Michael Leaves", "Out on a Limb", "Hand to God"

==== Sally Sitwell ====
Sally Sitwell (Christine Taylor) is Stan Sitwell's daughter and Michael's childhood sweetheart. In adulthood, she is briefly Michael's girlfriend. Sally and Lindsay were always competitive rivals, as they ran against each other for student body president in high school, and in adulthood Sally was campaign manager for Lucille Austero's run for Congress, while Lindsay worked for her opponent Herbert Love. (Season 4 ends with Lindsay and Sally taking over as the candidates after their employers' incapacitation and disappearance, respectively, mirroring their high school rivalry.) Also in season 4, Sally is in a relationship with Tony Wonder (Christine Taylor and Ben Stiller are married in real life). It is also revealed that she suffers from alopecia, like her father.

Appears in: "Burning Love", "Out on a Limb", "Flight of the Phoenix", "A New Attitude"

==== Stan Sitwell ====
Stan Sitwell (Ed Begley, Jr.) is a real estate tycoon who runs the company Sitwell Enterprises, which competes with the Bluth Company.

He has a disease that prevents him from growing hair on his body, alopecia universalis. Lucille incorrectly refers to him as an alpaca, which turns out to be partially correct when he acknowledges his wig is alpaca hair. Stan Sitwell begins dating Lucille Austero. His outlandish wigs and fake facial hair are a bit of an inside joke, since in real life Ed Begley Jr. is known for his mane of thick blonde hair. Because of his condition he can't actually drive the Corvette that Michael Bluth gave him in return of making a bid on his daughter Sally Sitwell at the Country Club auction because it is a convertible, which causes him to lose his wig and fake eyebrows. When Stan Sitwell fires Gob Bluth from his company, Gob gets revenge on Sitwell by stealing his fake dressy eyebrows. He runs his business in a very straight forward, professional manner in contrast to the lying and manipulation of the Bluths. He is also a generous philanthropist and contributes to numerous charities, contrary to the Bluths as well.

Appears in: "Switch Hitter", "Queen for a Day", "Burning Love", "Ready, Aim, Marry Me!", "Development Arrested", "Flight of the Phoenix"

==== Starla ====
Starla (Mo Collins) is the Bluth company secretary that Gob hires as his "business model" in season two after seeing her at a boat show. Starla often proves to be quite incompetent as a secretary, and claims that she had an affair with producer Quincy Jones, a claim backed up with the display of several of his gold records along the walls of Starla's house but disputed by spokespersons for Mr. Jones. On trying to gain entrance to his grounds, she is supposedly attacked by guard dogs, and is subsequently treated for rabies. Near the end of Season 2, Buster and Starla have a brief relationship, which abruptly ends when Buster misses his old flame Lucille Austero.

Appears in: "The One Where They Build a House", "¡Amigos!", "Switch Hitter", "Queen for a Day", "Ready, Aim, Marry Me!", "Sword of Destiny"

==== Stefan Gentles ====
Stefan Gentles (James Lipton) takes over as the prison warden where George is being detained after the previous warden, James Buck, leaves. He is less strict (though one of his favorite punishments involve beating people with a pillowcase full of batteries), and is a lover of the arts.

Gentles allows Tobias to research his role as Frightened Inmate Number 2 and enthusiastically encourages it. Gentles suggested that shadowing feared prisoner White Power Bill would help Tobias find the inspiration for the role. The warden's enthusiasm for acting is a metafictional joke, since the actor James Lipton is famous as the host of the real-world television series Inside the Actors Studio.

Gentles writes a screenplay called The New Warden, which is rejected by everyone including Maeby while she works as a film executive. With some editing by Lucille Bluth, he is able to get an elementary school to perform the adult-themed story as a school play.

Appears in: "Staff Infection", "Altar Egos", "Missing Kitty", "Prison Break-In", "The B. Team"

==== Tom Saunders ====
Tom Saunders (Tom Saunders) is an employee of the Bluth Company. His sad-sack personality and downtrodden looks (appearing to be a middle-aged man despite only being thirty years old as of season three) are frequently the butt of jokes. In season 4, Tom is revealed to be one of the many registered sex offenders living in Sudden Valley.

Appears in: "Afternoon Delight", "The Cabin Show", "Making a Stand", "Family Ties"

==== Trisha Thoon ====
Trisha Thoon (Stacey Grenrock-Woods) is the field reporter for Fox 6 news throughout season one. She often covers stories pertaining to the Bluth family.

Appears in: "Pilot", "Key Decisions", "Public Relations", "Let 'Em Eat Cake"

==== Wayne Jarvis ====
Wayne Jarvis (John Michael Higgins) is a lawyer who can describe himself in one word: "professional". Michael tries to hire Wayne to replace Barry Zuckerkorn but Wayne refuses once Michael and Lindsay try to use him to get back at their mother. Later Wayne becomes the prosecutor of the Bluth Company; when confronted with an accusation of a conflict of interest he replies, "It's called the PATRIOT Act, read it." Wayne Jarvis is "almost always" serious, a fact that caused him to once be called "the worst audience participant Cirque du Soleil ever had" because he "did not find their buffoonery amusing".

Appears in: "In God We Trust", "Sad Sack", "Righteous Brothers", "Fakin' It", "Exit Strategy"

==== Wife of Gob ====
Wife of Gob (Amy Poehler) is a certified seal salesperson who married Gob as part of an evening of escalating dares (meant to be a one-night stand). He never learned her name, which was a running joke. She is portrayed by Amy Poehler, who was, at the time, married in real life to Will Arnett, who plays Gob. Ironically, they would later divorce. Poehler's real name is used in a scene where Gob talks about the fact that he doesn't know her name and, when he learns it, he will mock it: "Bad example, if her name is Amy, I'll call her Blamey." He guesses her name as "Crindy" and "Saul Zentsman" (the latter turning out to be her lawyer), and when he meets her again misreads the "U.S. Army" label on her uniform as being her name, calling her "Usarmy". She sells trained seals (selling sick ones to third-world countries) and convinces Gob to wear bright, colorful sweaters. Possibly the only fan of Dr. Fünke's 100% Natural Good-Time Family Band Solution, she saw their show in the late '90s and was comforted by the fact that they sang about every side effect she was going through. When she realizes she is in love with Tobias, she decides to end her marriage to Gob to join the United States Army to make use of her propensity for daring behavior. She frequently takes photos while smoking and pointing at crotches, a clear parody of Lynndie England, a central figure in the Abu Ghraib prison scandal. She is seen in season one and does not appear again until the 13th episode of season two in her final appearance. In this appearance, she returns to break up with Gob and to reclaim the seals that she "gave" to him while in the army but is told that he does not have them because he set them free. One of the loose seals recently bit off Buster's left hand. She and Gob finally consummate their marriage just minutes before signing the divorce papers.

Appears in: "Altar Egos", "Justice Is Blind", "Best Man for the Gob", "Whistler's Mother", "Motherboy XXX"

=== In a story arc ===
==== Rebel Alley ====
Rebel Alley (Isla Fisher) is the illegitimate daughter of Ron Howard, introduced in the fourth season. She is an actress whose work consists primarily of Public Service Announcements, directed by her father, advising against her own misdeeds (shoplifting, texting while driving, etc.); however, she has also worked with Terrence Malick and Woody Allen as well as the American remake of Dangerous Cousins. Michael is attracted to Rebel due to her resemblance to his deceased wife Tracey. Despite not knowing her name, after meeting her Michael tries to impress her by bragging that he is a producer. Michael also mistakenly believes her to be the girlfriend rather than daughter of Ron Howard, and only realises the truth when he reveals his feelings for her in front of Ron and Tobias. Meanwhile, Rebel takes interest in George-Michael, intrigued by his Fakeblock software, unaware that he is Michael's son (he goes by the name "George Maharis"). Rebel spends the night with George-Michael when he invites her to his dorm and continues to lie about his fake software. In his own pursuit of Rebel, Michael learns that he and his son are seeing the same woman. When he thinks that they had broken up he runs into George-Michael on his way to see Rebel and they are forced to be honest with each other. She has a son named Lem Depardieu, who lives in France and only stays with her during French pilot season.

Appears in: "Borderline Personalities", "The B. Team", "Double Crossers", "Colony Collapse", "Red Hairing", "Smashed", "A New Attitude", "Señoritis", "It Gets Better"

==== Adelaide ====
Adelaide (Bronwen Masters) falls in love with Buster Bluth for his "limp form", while he is pretending to be in a coma in season 3. She has an Australian accent and has fallen in love with other male coma and paralyzed patients in the past. Adelaide appears in the earlier Season 3 episode "Notapusy" where she and Tony Hale are shown in a scene from the 1941 fake British wartime film "A Thoroughly Polite Dustup". The film is used to explain that, in Britain, calling someone a "Pussy" used to be a term of endearment, and therefore once differed in context to its American use as an insult. The word "Fag" is also used in the film short, which means "cigarette" in the UK. This film is also later parodied in the episode "Exit Strategy" with both actors playing the main characters, Nurse Adelaide and Buster Bluth.

Appears in: "Notapusy" (as 1941 wartime Nurse), "Fakin' It", "Family Ties", "Exit Strategy"

==== Larry Middleman ====
Larry Middleman (Bob Einstein) is a professional surrogate, hired by George Sr. to act as his eyes and ears so that he can continue influencing the family's dealings while under house arrest. "The Surrogate", as Larry is called, is always on the job, wearing a suit and tie at all times, with a baseball cap displaying the word "Surrogate". The cap carries a small camera and microphone, which transmit audio and video feeds in real-time to George Sr's computer and/or television. George Sr. has a voice feed back to the surrogate, so that he can tell Larry what to do, what to say on his behalf, where to go, etc. At one point, he also misinterprets George Sr.'s sarcasm as a compliment ("Another brilliant idea, Einstein").

Larry is a consummate professional, never allowing his own persona to come through except on rare occasions, such as when he sometimes inserts self-promoting comments ("He's worth every penny") among George Sr.'s actual words, and another occasion where he hit GOB for insulting him. Larry does occasionally misinterpret George Sr.'s instructions, usually with amusing consequences, and is challenged when Buster takes control of the microphone in an attempt to reconnect with Gob.

Larry appeared at the beginning of season three in the episode, "Forget-Me-Now" and stayed on for several episodes before being fired remotely in front of a mirror by George Sr. after a very poor judgement call regarding what was meant to have been a sotto voce comment, or perhaps unspoken altogether. He reappeared in "S.O.B.s" as a surrogate for a business associate of George Sr.

Appears in: "Forget-Me-Now", "Notapusy", "Mr. F", "The Ocean Walker", "S.O.B.s"

==== Maggie Lizer ====
Maggie Lizer (Julia Louis-Dreyfus), an attorney who pretends to be blind, is considered to be the most feared prosecuting attorney in all of Orange County, not because she is a particularly skilled prosecutor, but because her faked disability often won the sympathy of both the judge and defendant.

Maggie makes her first appearance in "Altar Egos", which aired on March 17, 2004.

Michael Bluth meets Maggie in a bar. When she introduces herself, she says her name is Maggie Lizer, as in "Maggie lies her ass off". After she mistakes Michael for an attorney, he awkwardly claims that his name is Chareth Cutestory and that he practices maritime law, a reference to a role as a lawyer that Michael held in a school musical, The Trial of Captain Hook. Maggie and Michael return to her home after drinking at the bar. He spends the night and wakes up perplexed as how to proceed. When he realizes she is blind, Michael decides to continue seeing her out of guilt.

Maggie is prosecuting the government's case against the Bluths; Maggie knew who Michael was but chose not to reveal this. Instead she gave him what she described as "a summary of everything the government has against the Bluths so far", which was actually a wish list, in an attempt to manipulate him. Michael continues seeing her despite the conflict of interest. When her guide dog, Justice, is revealed to be actually blind, Michael realizes that she is not blind, but had been faking the condition to pass her law school exams and gain sympathy during trials. As a result of the deception, Maggie is taken off the case.

Maggie returns for two episodes in season 2, eight-and-a-half months pregnant—eight-and-a-half months after her relationship with Michael. She later admits the child is not Michael's, having volunteered to be a surrogate for two homosexual police officers—though this also turns out to be a deception, as she "outsourced" the pregnancy to a client who was suing a restaurant for making her fat. Realizing that the two of them cannot be in a relationship as they crave complications in their lives, they decide to part ways after a final fling. Ironically, a throwaway gag at the end of the episode reveals Maggie became pregnant as a result.

Appears in: "Altar Egos", "Justice Is Blind", "Out on a Limb", "Hand to God"

==== Marta Estrella ====
Marta Estrella is the Colombian soap opera star of El Amor Prohibido that Gob dates in season one. In her first two appearances, Marta was played by Leonor Varela. She was played by Patricia Velásquez for all following episodes with one minor exception: during a flashback in the episode "Forget-Me-Now" of Michael's past experiences with women, she is played by a third actress. She has two sons: Amable (played by Oliver Patrick Sandino) and Cortesio (played by Casey Sandino). Marta is attractive, moral, and holds family to be very important. Although Marta was dating Gob, she and Michael Bluth soon develop feelings for each other. Marta eventually chooses Michael over Gob, but she ends up leaving both of them after she catches them fighting over her.

Appears in:

- Leonor Varela – "Bringing Up Buster", "Key Decisions"
- Patricia Velásquez – "In God We Trust", "My Mother, The Car", "Storming the Castle", "Marta Complex", "Beef Consommé"
- Uncredited Actress, "Forget-Me-Now"

==== Rita Leeds ====
Rita Leeds (Charlize Theron) is an English woman to whom Michael Bluth was attracted and briefly engaged.

Rita first appeared in the second episode of Season 3, "For British Eyes Only".

Rita is later revealed to be a wealthy heiress and owner of all Wee-Britain (and the Wee-Britain in Cleveland)—a fictional town that runs on GMT time and where one drives on the left.

There are a number of somewhat subtle indications that she may have a mental or learning disability throughout episodes 2, 3 and 4 of season 3; however, Michael either misinterprets this as charming eccentricity (attributing certain behavior to her being British) or does not seem to have noticed. Some of these indications include the fact she spends her days at "Slow Brook", a private school, in "Notapusy" she is seen casually walking out of a men's bathroom, and also carries around various stuffed animal-shaped backpacks, including a duck and a seal. In "Forget-Me-Now" Rita is drugged by Gob and left on a bus bench. The bench had an advert for Wee Britain, and the letters covered up by Rita's body leaves the clue that she has a "Wee Brain".

Rita is heavily involved in the "Mr. F" plot arc, wherein the family hears through their new lawyer, Bob Loblaw, that the CIA have a mole inside the Bluth family feeding them information whom they call "Mr. F." Rita wears a bracelet that says "MR F", and unintentionally implies to Michael that Mr. F is her uncle Trevor, who Michael believes is stalking him. At the conclusion of "Mr. F", it is revealed that Mr. F was actually a blunderous Tobias and that "MR F" is in fact an abbreviation for Mentally Retarded Female, confirming that Rita was mentally handicapped. She also was given a proposal of marriage by Michael Bluth.

In "The Ocean Walker", Michael, upon discovering Rita's mental handicap, ends his relationship with her. In the same episode, Trevor tells Rita, "It's not your fault your parents were cousins, but here we are. I've been charged with taking care of you, and I’m bloody well gonna do it."; a tongue-in-cheek reference to George Michael and Maeby's relationship.

It is later revealed that Rita finds a job at a competing movie studio from Maeby's, producing a project called "The Ocean Walker", although the film's development status is arrested. The project name is a result of Rita's belief that people can walk (presumably from America) to England. In one episode, Rita walks across a pool, not knowing that Gob rigged the pool with clear platforms for one of his illusions.

She was last seen in the series finale on the cover of a newspaper.

Appears in: "For British Eyes Only", "Forget-Me-Now", "Notapusy", "Mr. F", "The Ocean Walker"

==== Uncle Trevor ====
Trevor Leeds (Dave Thomas) is an English man and the uncle of Rita Leeds. He helped raise Rita, whose parents were cousins, which he implied might be a cause for her intellectual disability.

Uncle Trevor first appeared in the second episode of Season 3, "For British Eyes Only", in which he is first seen not letting Michael access legal files which are "for British eyes only". After Michael meets Rita, he is seen swerving his Austin-Healey into the Bluth's staircar, threatening Michael with regard to his prior interaction with Rita. Michael misinterprets the threat, thinking it has to do with the search for information regarding his father, and that Trevor has been stalking him.

He is last seen in "The Ocean Walker", the sixth episode of Season 3. In this episode, after learning of Rita's intention to attend a "sleepover" with Michael, he visits the Bluth residence and informs them of Rita's "millions" and her ownership of Wee Britain. He later leaves for England with Rita at the end of the episode.

He also appears to be a fan of cricket, having apparently collected cricket magazines and even being in possession of a cricket bat, which was also seen in the cover of his secret magazine, Bumpaddle.

Appears in: "For British Eyes Only", "Forget-Me-Now", "Notapusy", "Mr. F", "The Ocean Walker"

==== White Power Bill ====
White Power Bill (David Reynolds) is a massive, bald, white supremacist inmate with George Bluth Sr. at the Orange County Prison.

White Power Bill is incensed when confronted with George's jailhouse conversion to Judaism. He is particularly upset at George's gesture of giving Little Justice, an inmate of the prison, a kippah for protection and giving him the new name, David Ben-Avram. He responds by hitting Little Justice with a pipe, knocking off his kippa. George diplomatically states that ."..both of our religions have a lot to offer. There's the Jewish notion of heaven, and that it can be obtained here on earth, and there is your belief in the cleansing power of the pipe."

When Gob incarcerates himself in Orange County Prison (to break out as his greatest trick) he performs an "illusion" on Bill and pulls a quarter out of Bill's ear, thus giving him his new nickname: "Dirty Ears" Bill. Bill becomes furious and later stabs Gob (right after he is finally able to have a game of catch with his father in a prison yard), yelling "White Power", which gets the necessary response of, "...but...I'm white..." from Gob.

Upon meeting Tobias, Bill refers to him as a "little kike." Tobias, oblivious ("It's been quite a while since anyone called me a tyke!"), is at the prison researching the role of "Frightened Inmate #2" in a prison drama. He leads Bill in a counseling session which unintentionally culminates in Bill's suicide after Tobias suggests that Bill's inner rage stems from a hatred of himself ("You hate White Power Bill"); Bill jumps from the cell-block landing, saying "I hate White Power Bill..." and dies.

Appears in: "Key Decisions", "Staff Infection", "Missing Kitty"

==== Argyle Austero ====
Argyle Austero (Tommy Tune) is the flamboyant brother of "Lucille 2" Austero and runs her rehab clinic, Austerity, where he is introduced to Tobias. Tobias, after initially refusing her offer, had decided it would be best to go on a work release program than stay in prison for a sex offense. Tobias convinces Argyle to make a Musical of the Fantastic 4 (written and directed by Tobias) in order to be with his girlfriend DeBrie who had recently joined the rehab group. Argyle was unable to resist the idea of producing a musical and in order to pay for it is he helps his sister by threatening Michael to pay his debt of $700,000. Ultimately, Argyle is forced to step in for DeBrie as the Invisible Girl and performed the musical with Tobias on Cinco de Quatro. In Season 5, Argyle appears as the leader of the "Gay Mafia", and threatens Gob for pretending to be gay, and hints that they killed Tony Wonder for doing the same.

Appears in: "Smashed"

==== Marky Bark ====
Marky Bark (Chris Diamantopoulos), introduced in season 4, is an environmental/political activist Lindsay meets when accompanying Tobias to a methadone clinic he thinks is an acting class. Falling in love with his ideals, Lindsay runs away with him, learning later that he suffers from "face blindness", causing him to be unable to remember what Lindsay looks like, and that he runs an ostrich farm with his mother (Debra Mooney), a lifestyle Lindsay has trouble getting used to. Marky's goal is to bring down right-wing politician Herbert Love. He first creates a blue "glitter bomb" that he intends to go off at a political fundraiser; unfortunately, Lindsay fails to help him get out of the podium he's hiding in, resulting in the bomb going off on him and covering him in blue glitter, after which he is arrested. After he is released from jail, he plans to make an actual bomb to explode near Love at Cinco de Cuatro; however, he plants it in Lindsay's suitcase, and since Lindsay and Tobias have matching luggage, he takes the wrong suitcase and the bomb explodes on the boat he and Tobias are on. He is the son of environmental activist Johnny Bark (Clint Howard).

Appears in: "Indian Takers"

==== Debrie Bardeaux ====
Debrie Bardeaux (Maria Bamford), introduced in season 4, is a recovering drug addict Tobias meets and falls in love with at a methodone clinic he thinks is an acting class. She is a former actress who played Sue Storm in an ultra-low-budget movie adaptation of the Fantastic Four, and Tobias tries to convince her to get back into acting. However, after no success at this, she leaves him and relapses. They meet again at the Austerity rehab center, where Tobias is a court-appointed counselor. Tobias tries to cast her as Sue Storm in his musical adaptation of Fantastic Four, to be staged at Cinco de Cuatro, but her stage fright (and the drugs she sees floating in the harbor the night of the show) lead to her not participating in the end.

Appears in: "Indian Takers"

==== Herbert Love ====
Herbert Love (Terry Crews), introduced in season 4, is a conservative candidate for the House of Representatives who is running against Lucille Austero. He is a parody of 2012 U.S. Republican Party presidential candidate Herman Cain.

==== Ron Howard ====
In addition to voicing The Narrator, Ron Howard has appeared on the show as himself several times. Howard is among the individuals in Maeby's contact list to whom George Michael sends an invitation to her birthday. In his first on-screen appearance at the end of the final episode of season 3, Howard informs Maeby, with a hint of irony, that her life story would be better off being made into a movie as opposed to a TV series. Howard has a more substantial role in season four, in which he hires Michael to help produce a fictional movie based on the Bluths' story.

==== Dr. Norman, China Garden and Heartfire ====
Dr. Norman, China Garden and Heartfire, introduced in season 4, are friends of Oscar Bluth's who live with him on a commune at the U.S./Mexico border. George Sr. meets them while running his "sweat and squeeze" scam with Oscar.

Dr. Norman (John Slattery) is a disgraced anesthesiologist who often gives advice under the influence of ether. Trying to help George Sr. with his impotence, he advises him to get on an MRI machine and "ride it to climax", which George interprets to mean masturbate. Norman later denies ever giving such advice, saying it's something he'd say "with my thinking cap on."

China Garden (Karen Maruyama) is Dr. Norman's girlfriend, whom he met via a prison pen-pal program. She is loud and has a heavy accent. Her mother, Olive Garden, is in prison with Lucille.

Heartfire (Mary Lynn Rajskub) is a mute spiritualist who communicates telepathically through her thoughts, though no one ever interprets her thoughts correctly or hears her. Her thoughts are seen as floating subtitles.

== Fictional characters within Arrested Development ==
=== Franklin Delano Bluth ===
Franklin Delano Bluth is Gob's black puppet.

The character is first introduced in the season 2 episode "Meat the Veals", in a flashback to a Bluth family gathering years before. In an effort to hip-up his act, Gob briefly introduced the puppet in a poorly executed ventriloquist act (Gob's mouth moves every time Franklin speaks, even when Gob abandons actual ventriloquism in favor of an audio recorder hidden in Franklin's mouth). Franklin is a fiery-tempered, adulterous, obscenity-spewing, street-wise puppet.

Gob discarded Franklin up in the attic, most likely due to the severe beating Gob received in a night club in Torrance after performing a show with Franklin. During "Meat the Veals", Gob digs up his old friend and uses Franklin in a kidnapping plot with George Sr. Gob soaks Franklin's lips with ether, so that a kiss will incapacitate his mother, and any witnesses (in this case, Buster). Franklin is again soaked in ether two episodes later in "Righteous Brothers" in order to incapacitate George Sr. It's also revealed in "Meat the Veals" that whoever is in possession of Franklin begins speaking like him (cf. when George Sr. finds Franklin in the attic, he blurts, "Hey, man, you're gonna get your sorry white ass thrown in jail!" and "Get your loser hand out of my ass!" when Gob finds Franklin, and when Buster uses Franklin as a hook replacement and Lucille tells him he can't take Franklin to the country club). This phenomenon appears to be involuntary, and surprises the person holding Franklin as much as those around them, evidenced by the quizzical stare which Buster directs at the puppet following the aforementioned outburst by the usually reserved Buster.

Then Gob records a music CD with Franklin called Franklin Comes Alive, which he hoped would "break down racial barriers and maybe be a crossover hit." The song tracks include "It Ain't Easy Bein' White" and Gob's cover of Bryan Adams' song "(Everything I Do) I Do It for You" which Gob performed especially for Michael. Unfortunately Franklin's musical career is cut short during "Righteous Brothers" when a laundry accident results in Franklin getting bleached. Franklin says, in what is now a stiff, slightly British accent, "You've ruined the act, Gob", and as Gob later tells Michael, Franklin has become "all puckered and white."

Franklin returns in some season 3 episodes, most prominently in "Fakin' It", after he is re-dyed and rested; as a publicity stunt, Gob manages to get Franklin on the witness list for George Sr.'s trial. (A deleted scene reveals that Gob legally adopted Franklin as his son to achieve this.) Gob also finds a way to give Franklin a voice without moving his lips by using voice promos from a magazine advertisement for Mock Trial with J. Reinhold. At the end of the episode, Franklin's dramatic testimonial on the witness stand effectively ends the prosecution's case against the Bluths. Franklin also appears in the next episode "Family Ties" as "Frank", a pimp for whom Nellie works.

Franklin is a portrayal of the 1950s–1980s stereotype of blacks. As part of the political satire, Franklin also wears a "George Bush doesn't care about black puppets" T-shirt in "Fakin' It", a reference to Kanye West's "George Bush doesn't care about black people" remark. No matter who is controlling him, Franklin often curses and uses racial slurs to describe others in the Bluth Family.

The name Franklin Delano Bluth borrows from the 32nd President of the United States Franklin Delano Roosevelt, but the reason for this is that in the 1970s Sesame Street introduced what some claimed to be an "insultingly stereotypical African-American" puppet named Roosevelt Franklin (though the puppet's actual intended ethnicity was ambiguous and its 'skin' was purple); the character was eventually dropped from the show's line-up. Franklin could also be another tribute to the Peanuts cartoons, as this show also featured an African-American character named Franklin. It is also probable Franklin is inspired at least in some way by Chuck's dummy Bob on the television show Soap shown on ABC from 1977 to 1981.

The running gag with Franklin is that despite being a mere puppet, he is actually treated as a real person. This can be seen in "Meat the Veals", where the Security Guard treats him with respect, George Sr. attacks him for kissing Lucille, and the police regarded him as threat despite being immobile at the vehicle in the same episode.

Appears in: "Meat the Veals", "Spring Breakout", "Righteous Brothers", "Forget-Me-Now", "Prison Break-In", "Fakin' It", "Family Ties"

=== Mr. Bananagrabber ===
Mr. Bananagrabber is a Hamburglar-inspired character invented by Gob.

Mr. Bananagrabber was conceived by Gob after his brother, Michael Bluth, told him that he could not have a free Bluth Banana. Dejected, Gob decides to get a candy apple at one of the other shops on the boardwalk. When Gob bites into the candy apple, it breaks his tooth and Gob develops a whistle anytime he says a word with an "s" in it (a key characteristic of Bananagrabber). Gob and Michael then meet again, and Michael says Gob can have a free Bluth Banana and in exchange, Gob gives Michael the animation rights to Mr. Bananagrabber (Michael makes Mr. Banana Grabber look a lot like Gob from his hair, to his missing-tooth whistle, to his Segway. When Gob sees the commercial, he says "I never should have given up animation rights.").

Mr. Bananagrabber appeared in Season 4, Episode 13: Sit Down, Shut Up! in a nightmare/flashback sequence.

Michael Bluth discussing the Mr. Bananagrabber character: "I guess it would just be a guy who, you know, grabs bananas and runs. Or a banana that grabs things. I don't know. Why would a banana grab another banana? I mean those are the kind of questions I don't want to answer."

Mr. Bananagrabber's first appearance was in "Charity Drive". At the end of the episode, we see the first incarnation of Mr. Bananagrabber as an animated character. The short animation clip scene was designed and animated by Evan Spiridellis, one half of the animation duo JibJab. Mr. Bananagrabber also appears briefly in the episodes "Whistler's Mother", "The Immaculate Election" and "Spring Breakout", as well as a brief cameo in the main titles of the "Scandalmakers" program, as seen in season 2. Although images do not exist, a Mrs. and Baby-Bananagrabber are mentioned by Gob.

Like Gob, Mr. Bananagrabber rides around on a Segway human transporter, which is referred to as "Gob's scooter" on the show.

Appears in: "Charity Drive", "Whistler's Mother", "The Immaculate Election", "Spring Breakout"

=== Mrs. Featherbottom ===
Phylidia Featherbottom is an alter-ego of Tobias Fünke, dressed in drag and speaking in falsetto with an English accent.

Tobias, having moved out of the model home due to his marital problems with Lindsay, returns disguised (poorly) as a British nanny to spend time with his daughter and prove to his wife that he has what it takes to become an actor. The disguise fools no one, and the performance is comically unrealistic, but the Bluths play along with the charade because Mrs. Featherbottom is an excellent cleaner, working for free.

Narration explains that the idea behind Mrs. Featherbottom is lifted directly from the film Mrs. Doubtfire, with elements of Mary Poppins. She comes from the fictional Blackstool (a play on the English town Blackpool, Lancashire) and has previously worked for "the Roger Moores". Mrs. Featherbottom's faux-British speech combines with Tobias's penchant for homosexual innuendo: "Who'd like a banger in the mouth?"

Mrs. Featherbottom is introduced in "The Immaculate Election" and is seen additionally working for Lucille at her home at the end of this episode. At the beginning of "Sword of Destiny", Tobias's "desire to be discovered as himself was becoming bothersome", and he was pretending to be Mrs. Featherbottom while unshaven and without makeup. However, Lindsay is still reluctant to expose him, because Mrs Featherbottom "is the only one who can hand-wash [her] delicates". In "Meat the Veals", Mrs. Featherbottom injures her ankle by "attempting an entrance that he hoped would enchant his daughter", jumping from the halfway down the staircase to the ground floor with an umbrella in his hand, collapsing and destroying the coffee table. Mrs. Featherbottom loses her wig and is finally exposed at the conclusion of "Meet the Veals", to no one's surprise.

The name 'Featherbottom' is also used by Maeby and Lindsay in season 4.

Appears in: "The Immaculate Election", "Sword of Destiny", "Meat the Veals"

=== Surely Fünke/Woolfbeak ===
Surely Fünke is Maeby Fünke's imaginary twin and second identity that she uses to raise sympathy from the public and thus swindle money from them at fraudulent fundraising events.

In Maeby's many schemes she often uses the alter-ego, Surely (the word being an antonym of maybe), to fool schoolmates and the community, in an attempt to make money from fundraisers for Surely, who Maeby presents as an ill wheelchair user, suffering from the imaginary rare, debilitating illness, "B.S." Posters are seen at the school in episode "Shock and Aww", but it isn't until several episodes later that Maeby's grift is revealed. In "Altar Egos", George Michael attends the fundraiser for Surely Fünke, where he discovers that Maeby has been posing as the fictional dying girl. Maeby says she plans to kill Surely to give the students something to be sad about at the end of the year.

In "Notapusy", Maeby pretends to be Surely Woolfbeak and enters an inner beauty pageant to prove there really is no such thing as a true inner beauty pageant. Surely Woolfbeak was essentially the same as Surely Fünke (who was apparently "killed off" two seasons earlier, as per Maeby's plan). The only real difference between them was that as Woolfbeak, Maeby wore the ugly prosthetic nose worn by Nicole Kidman in "The Hours" that actor Jamie Kennedy had purchased for her at an auction, in hopes that she would use him in a remake of a film she was producing.

== Brief characters ==
These are more or less minor characters, appearing usually for only one episode or so.

=== Cindi Lightballoon ===
Cindi Lightballoon (Jane Lynch) is an undercover agent working for the federal government to uncover George's secret dealings. Posing as a fan of his Torah videos (which she actually is), she eventually falls in love with George, who only enjoys tweaking her nipples.

Appears in: "Shock and Aww", "Altar Egos", "Justice Is Blind"

=== Ice ===
Ice (Malik Yoba) is a bounty hunter and professional caterer.

Ice is initially employed by Gob to follow Michael, although a recurring joke is that Gob views Ice as his friend. (Michael later pays Ice to spend the weekend with Gob).

Ice commits a series of blunders and is easily persuaded by money. He first follows Michael to Mexico while under the employment of Gob, and then is hired by Michael to find George Sr. Ice is given a blueprint with a picture of George Sr. on it, but is confused and tackles Tobias because he is wearing blue paint, and thus resembles the blue tint of the picture. Ice then returns to tracking Michael until Michael finally pays him to spend time with Gob and resume the search for George Sr. In the following episode, Ice ascertains that George Sr. was killed by a prison guard in Mexico.

Throughout these events, Ice consistently ignores or is oblivious to Lindsay's attempts to attract him. At one point, Lindsay pretends to be talking to George Sr. on the phone so that Ice will follow her to get to George Sr., but this plan proves futile.

When Ice notifies the family of George Sr.'s plight, he displays his party-planning talents by catering the event and leaves a business card with them to help jumpstart his alternate career of party-planning, referred to as his "first love."

Carl Weathers mentions to Tobias in season 2 that, in a show called Scandal Makers that he was directing to portray the Bluths, he had decided to play Ice.

Appears in: "¡Amigos!", "Good Grief"

=== "Uncle" Jack ===
"Uncle" Jack Dorso (Martin Short) is not related to the Bluth family, and was actually a friend of George Sr.'s dad. He gave George Sr. the money to buy the first tract of land for the Bluth development company in exchange for what is implied to be sexual favors from Lucille.

Jack Dorso achieved stardom as the sidekick in the radio show "Red McGibbon and Bullet: Nazi Hunters." After his partner was imprisoned for being a communist sympathizer, Jack was unable to get work as an actor. He opened a chain of fitness centers, and came to be known for his annual "Birthday Feats of Strength." He lost the use of his legs on his 70th birthday when he attempted to squat 350 lb (5 lb for each year of his life).

Now a 90-year-old paraplegic fitness buff, he refuses the use of a wheelchair. Instead he gets around by being carried like a child by a large man named Dragon who is hard of hearing. Dragon's hearing impairment causes him difficulty in following Jack's directions.

Uncle Jack agrees to give the Bluth family more money in exchange for a date with Lindsay, a woman more than half a century his junior. Lindsay was convinced to go on the date by Michael telling her the date was with Dragon, but that Dragon has to work, thus explaining Jack's presence.

Appears in: "Ready, Aim, Marry Me!"

=== James Buck ===
James Buck (Rocky McMurray) is warden of George's prison until he is replaced by Stefan Gentles. Buck is aggressive and unappreciative of the Bluths, though he allows Gob to try to perform an escape act from the prison, which largely fails, leading Gob to write a "strongly worded letter" to Buck, for which he is detained against the trailer George Sr. and Lucille are having sex in.

Appears in: "Key Decisions", "Visiting Ours"

=== Phillip Litt ===
Phillip Litt (Zach Braff) is the director of the film series Girls With Low Self-Esteem (a parody of Girls Gone Wild); while the series is often referenced in the show, Litt only appears after Gob's failed magic act is included in the newest release. He, along with Tobias, is a never-nude. Braff was likely cast due to his resemblance to Girls Gone Wild creator Joe Francis.

Appears in: "Spring Breakout", "S.O.B.s" (briefly)

=== Frank Wrench (Moses Taylor) ===
Frank Wrench (Rob Corddry) is the protagonist of Wrench, a fictional television series about a rule-abiding police detective. He is played by actor Moses Taylor, who is also a vocal gun activist, frequently brandishing a realistic prop gun that shoots out a flag imprinted with the Second Amendment. Lindsay briefly begins an affair with Taylor which is interrupted when she is tranquilized. From the perspective of a group of onlookers, Taylor, who is holding his prop gun, looks like he has murdered her; he quickly carries her to a bench where he leaves her and flees the scene. His voice is later heard outside the door to the bathroom on the set of Wrench, which Tobias has entered, believing it to have a real, functioning toilet.

Appears in: "Burning Love", "Sword of Destiny"

=== Tracey Bluth ===
Tracey Bluth is Michael's deceased wife, and George Michael's deceased mother. She died of ovarian cancer before the series. She is briefly seen in a flashback/fake ad in season 4, played by Maria Thayer.

Appears in: "It Gets Better"

=== Nellie ===
Nellie, played by Justine Bateman, is a prostitute who Michael mistakes for his sister. He also mistakenly believes that she is a business consultant (her job title, if read carefully, is "conslutant") and hires her to work at the Bluth Company.

Although Michael and Nellie turn out not to be related, Jason and Justine Bateman are siblings in real life.

Appears in: "Family Ties"
