= Not Without My Daughter (Arrested Development) =

- Arrested Development episode
- Episode no.: Season 1 Episode 21
- Directed by: Lee Shallat Chemel
- Written by: Mitchell Hurwitz; Richard Rosenstock
- Cinematography by: Greg Harrington
- Editing by: Robert Bramwell
- Production code: 1AJD20
- Original air date: April 25, 2004
- Running time: 22 minutes

Guest appearances
- Henry Winkler as Barry Zuckerkorn; Justin Lee as Annyong Bluth; Kevin McDonald as Detective Streudler

Episode chronology
← Previous "Whistler's Mother"	Next → "Let 'Em Eat Cake"
- Arrested Development season 1

"Not Without My Daughter" is the twenty-first episode of the first season of the American television satirical sitcom Arrested Development. It was written by series creator Mitchell Hurwitz and co-executive producer Richard Rosenstock, and directed by Lee Shallat Chemel. It originally aired on Fox on April 25, 2004.

The series, narrated by Ron Howard, follows the Bluths, a formerly wealthy, dysfunctional family, who made their money from property development. The Bluth family consists of Michael, his twin sister Lindsay, his older brother Gob, his younger brother Buster, their mother Lucille and father George Sr., Michael's son George Michael, and Lindsay and her husband Tobias' daughter Maeby. In the episode, Michael breaks with tradition and takes his niece Maeby to Take Your Daughter to Work Day, but he regrets this when he is questioned by police investigating Kitty's disappearance. Lindsay, embarrassed to be working at a clothing store, claims that she is shoplifting. This becomes a personal challenge for magician Gob.

== Plot ==
As Michael heads off to work, George Michael, reminds him it is "Take Your Daughter to Work Day". Long ago, Michael brought George Michael as a joke and has done so every year since, but now Michael wants the tradition to end. Maeby plans to join Tobias in watching entertainment news. Gob comes in with the new Girls with Low Self-Esteem tape, filmed when he made the family yacht disappear. (Note: As seen in "Missing Kitty.") Michael comments on a new outfit Lindsay says she stole, but she actually works at the shop and is too embarrassed to admit it. Michael takes Maeby to work to show her a good role model. Lucille gets Oscar to pretend to be George Sr. at Annyong's soccer game.

George Michael is upset about Maeby taking his place, Gob is insecure at Lindsay apparently being better at sleight-of-hand than he is, and Tobias wants to find a job that will prove he is a man and impress his daughter, so the three head to the mall. Tobias gets a job as a security guard while Gob and George Michael purchase mice at the pet store. Michael challenges Maeby to go one day without telling a lie, which she agrees to for $50 and Michael's promise to do the same. Two police officers arrive, investigating the disappearance of Kitty, who was last seen flashing Michael at a restaurant. (Note: As seen in "Missing Kitty.") However, Kitty is seen on the yacht that Gob blew up on a Girls with Low Self-Esteem tape. Buster visits George Sr. in prison and tells him that Oscar escorted Lucille to the soccer game, so George Sr. makes him promise to get rid of Oscar. Michael and Maeby go to the police station to answer questions about Kitty, where they meet with Barry Zuckerkorn, who suggests Michael lie about the tape showing Kitty on the yacht.

Lindsay calls to check on Maeby as Gob arrives with George Michael with the box of mice. Gob knocks the box onto the floor, releasing the mice, and starts stuffing shirts into George Michael's pants to shoplift. Lindsay, on the phone with Michael, loudly proclaims that she is a shoplifter, so Tobias tackles Lindsay. Gob and George Michael are caught by the daughter of the head of security. Buster goes to Oscar's camper where he tells Oscar he is not wanted there. At the police station, Michael is questioned, as the detectives know Kitty had evidence against George Sr. Michael gets a call from George Michael, telling him there is an emergency at the mall. After being hit in the head by a soccer ball, Buster runs through the crowd of players, knocking them all over before firing the ball directly at Annyong. Michael arrives at the mall, where Lindsay admits that she worked there but had just been fired because they thought she was helping Gob shoplift. George Michael is still upset that Michael spent time with Maeby instead of him. Michael remembers that Maeby, still committed to truth-telling, is at the police station, where she has seen Kitty alive and discovered that the police were bluffing. Tobias loses his security job by shooting at Gob's mice, Lindsay shoplifts clothes, and Annyong attacks Buster as revenge.

== Production ==
"Not Without My Daughter" was directed by Lee Shallat Chemel, and written by series creator Mitchell Hurwitz and co-executive producer Richard Rosenstock. It was Shallat Chemel's third directing credit, Hurwitz's seventh writing credit and Rosenstock's fifth writing credit. It was the twentieth and penultimate episode of the season to be filmed after the pilot, and the eighth of Fox's second episode order for the season.

== Reception ==
=== Viewers ===
In the United States, the episode was watched by 5.66 million viewers on its original broadcast.

=== Critical reception ===
The A.V. Club writer Noel Murray praised the episode, saying "Arrested Development makes the most of a largely forgotten and meaningless feel-good event [of Take Your Daughter To Work Day]". In 2019, Brian Tallerico from Vulture ranked the episode 69th out of the whole series, calling it "The most forgettable episode of the first season" and is "the rare early episode that feels like it’s merely treading water, perhaps saving the good stuff for the season finale."
