= Missing Kitty =

- Arrested Development episode
- Episode no.: Season 1 Episode 16
- Directed by: Joe Russo
- Written by: Mitchell Hurwitz; John Levenstein
- Cinematography by: Greg Harrington
- Editing by: Steven Sprung
- Production code: 1AJD15
- Original air date: March 28, 2004
- Running time: 22 minutes

Guest appearances
- James Lipton as Warden Stefan Gentles; Judy Greer as Kitty Sanchez; Justin Lee as Annyong Bluth; David Reynolds as White Power Bill; John Beard as himself; B.W. Gonzalez as Lupe

Episode chronology
← Previous "Staff Infection"	Next → "Altar Egos"
- Arrested Development season 1

"Missing Kitty" is the sixteenth episode (Note: The episode is listed as the sixteenth episode of the season on the DVD collection, but originally aired as the eighteenth episode.) of the first season of the American television satirical sitcom Arrested Development. It was written by series creator Mitchell Hurwitz and co-executive producer John Levenstein, and directed by producer Joe Russo. It originally aired on Fox on March 28, 2004.

The series, narrated by Ron Howard, follows the Bluths, a formerly wealthy, dysfunctional family, who made their money from property development. The Bluth family consists of Michael, his twin sister Lindsay, his older brother Gob, his younger brother Buster, their mother Lucille and father George Sr., Michael's son George Michael, and Lindsay and her husband Tobias' daughter Maeby. In the episode, Michael and George Sr. argue over the firing of Kitty, Michael's assistant and George's mistress. Gob announces his intentions to sink the company yacht in a magic act on the beach, inspiring George Michael's admiration.

== Plot ==
While on spring break, Gob teaches George Michael some unsuccessful magic tricks and tells Michael that he plans to make the family yacht disappear with George Michael's help. Michael and Lindsay discuss the office secretary, Kitty, who has been on sick leave. Lindsay wonders why she has not gotten Maeby's annual birthday check from Nana, Lucille's mother, so she and Maeby go to Nana's home. It takes them a while before they realize the woman who lives there is not Nana. Meanwhile, Tobias, still researching his role of Frightened Inmate #2, has been traded by George Sr. to White Power Bill for a pack of cigarettes. Michael arrives at work to find that Kitty has gotten breast implants. She says she is taking a vacation week, but Michael forbids it and then fires her when she starts to walk out anyway.

George Sr. tells Michael that he cannot fire Kitty, and Michael realizes that George Sr. paid for Kitty's implants. Kitty, who was sleeping with George Sr., has access to a lot of information, so George Sr. pleads with Michael to hire her back. Lucille has decided to use Annyong as her purse, and Lindsay consults her mother about Nana. Lucille says she is on a cruise. In fact, Lucille's mother has been dead for six months, and Lucille fears that the family will come after the inheritance when they find out. Gob performs magic on the yacht with George Michael. Michael, looking for Kitty, suggests that George Michael work for him at the office and tells Gob to leave his son alone. At the prison, Tobias plays therapist to White Power Bill and gets him to realize that he hates himself, leading him to commit suicide. The other inmates hail Tobias, thinking he intentionally killed White Power Bill. Michael tries to re-hire Kitty, but ends up re-firing her instead.

George Michael starts filling in for Kitty. Lindsay discusses Nana with Michael, fearing that Lucille has sent her to a retirement home. Maeby convinces George Michael to find out how Gob makes the yacht disappear, but Gob sends him away. Tobias, now in a position of power at the prison, confronts George Sr. about his hatred for him. On the beach, Gob makes the yacht disappear, but tells the family that he sank it, so now they can collect the insurance. Lucille, seeing a chance, announces Nana was on the yacht, but Lindsay says that she has found out about Nana's death and Lucille's attempts to hide it. Lucille reveals that the inheritance money from Nana has been put in a trust fund for Annyong. For a minute, everyone thinks George Michael was on the yacht, but he returned to the office to work as Michael suggested. Kitty, however, was on the yacht trying to recover blackmail material, and floats out to sea, clutching a cooler of evidence.

== Production ==
"Missing Kitty" was directed by producer Joe Russo, and written by series creator Mitchell Hurwitz and co-executive producer John Levenstein. It was Russo's seventh directing credit, Hurwitz's fifth writing credit and Levenstein's fourth writing credit. It was the fifteenth episode of the season to be filmed after the pilot, and the third of Fox's second episode order for the season.

== Reception ==
=== Viewers ===
In the United States, the episode was watched by 5.51 million viewers on its original broadcast, a decrease of over 1.5 million viewers from the previously aired episode, "Justice Is Blind".

=== Critical reception ===
The A.V. Club writer Noel Murray praised the episode, saying "“Missing Kitty” seems snappier than “Staff Infection” to me, though it’s not as tightly woven." In 2019, Brian Tallerico from Vulture ranked the episode as the ninth best of the whole series.
