= Public Relations (Arrested Development) =

- Arrested Development episode
- Episode no.: Season 1 Episode 11
- Directed by: Lee Shallat Chemel
- Written by: Courtney Lilly
- Cinematography by: James Hawkinson; Greg Harrington (uncredited)
- Editing by: Lee Haxall
- Production code: 1AJD10
- Original air date: January 25, 2004
- Running time: 22 minutes

Guest appearances
- Jill Ritchie as Jessie; Carl Weathers as himself; John Beard as himself; B.W. Gonzalez as Lupe; Stacey Grenrock-Woods as Trisha Thoon

Episode chronology
← Previous "Pier Pressure"	Next → "Marta Complex"
- Arrested Development season 1

"Public Relations" is the eleventh episode of the first season of the American television satirical sitcom Arrested Development. It was written by Courtney Lilly and directed by Lee Shallat Chemel. It originally aired on Fox on January 25, 2004.

The series, narrated by Ron Howard, follows the Bluths, a formerly wealthy, dysfunctional family, who made their money from property development. The Bluth family consists of Michael, his twin sister Lindsay, his older brother Gob, his younger brother Buster, their mother Lucille and father George Sr., as well as Michael's son George Michael, and Lindsay and her husband Tobias' daughter Maeby. In the episode, Michael hires a publicist for the family, but she turns against them when he decides they should not date in the interest of George Michael.

== Plot ==
Michael takes George Michael for an interview at the prestigious Milford School. Its credo is that children should be neither seen nor heard. The dean is unwilling to associate the school with the tarnished Bluth name, producing a recent newspaper headlining Lucille's brawl with Lindsay at a restaurant. Fearing the family's bad press could affect George Michael's future, Michael hires Jessie, a publicist whom he met at the gym, to improve the family's image. Jessie tells the Bluths that Michael, as the most likeable one, will become the face of the Bluth family, Gob will start doing charity work, Lindsay will get a job promoting a fancy vodka, Tobias will get his medical license back, and Buster will stay out of the public eye.

Tobias, on his way to a medical-license review in Boston, meets actor Carl Weathers on the ride-share van to the airport. Instead of going to Boston, Tobias petitions Carl to teach him acting for $1,100 (the amount Michael gave Tobias for his plane ticket). Carl accepts. Meanwhile, Michael takes Jessie out for dinner, where she indicates her romantic intentions. George Michael, who hopes the public relations plan will fail because he does not want to attend a different school from Maeby, indicates that he dislikes Jessie. Concerned by George Michael's doubts, Michael suggests to Jessie that they take a step back, and she quits as the Bluth's publicist. Michael gets a call from Gob saying he needs Jessie to spin a story for him. During his charity magic show at a retirement home, Gob made Earl Milford, founder of the Milford School, disappear into the Aztec Tomb permanently.

The next day, Gob unloads his equipment and discovers Earl Milford hiding in one of his trunks in order to escape from the home. Gob holds a press conference to reveal Earl Milford's return. Jessie drops by the banana stand and blames George Michael for destroying her relationship with Michael, threatening to portray the Bluths as the worst family in town. Later that night, Tobias and Carl, hoping to get free food, visit Lindsay at the restaurant where she works, and where Michael is meeting Jessie to patch things up. Lindsay and Lucille want to fight Jessie because they saw the planted story in that day's paper. Michael tries to hold them back. When he learns that Jessie threatened George Michael though, Michael steps back, and a free-for-all breaks out. Back home, Michael reassures George Michael that he can be honest with him and asks him if he is disappointed that he will not get to go to Milford. George Michael tells him that he is not and that Michael can date whoever he wants. He says it is sad that Michael is not taking more chances with women, prompting Michael to ask him to be less honest.

== Production ==
"Public Relations" was directed by Lee Shallat Chemel and written by Courtney Lilly. It was Shallat Chemel's first directing credit and Lilly's first writing credit. It was the tenth episode of the ordered season to be filmed after the pilot.

== Reception ==
=== Viewers ===
In the United States, the episode was watched by 6.37 million viewers on its original broadcast.

=== Critical reception ===
The A.V. Club writer Noel Murray praised the episode, saying "the issue of how the Bluths “play” in the media makes for another stellar episode, completing a four-episode run of excellence that in and of itself would cement Arrested Development’s reputation as one of the all-time greats." In 2019, Brian Tallerico from Vulture ranked the episode 23rd out of the whole series.
