= Whistler's Mother (Arrested Development) =

- Arrested Development episode
- Episode no.: Season 1 Episode 20
- Directed by: Paul Feig
- Written by: John Levenstein; Jim Vallely
- Cinematography by: Greg Harrington
- Editing by: Steven Sprung
- Production code: 1AJD19
- Original air date: April 11, 2004
- Running time: 22 minutes

Guest appearance
- Amy Poehler as Wife of Gob

Episode chronology
← Previous "Best Man for the Gob"	Next → "Not Without My Daughter"
- Arrested Development season 1

"Whistler's Mother" is the twentieth episode of the first season of the American television satirical sitcom Arrested Development. It was written by co-executive producer John Levenstein and consulting producer Jim Vallely and directed by Paul Feig. It originally aired on Fox on April 11, 2004.

The series, narrated by Ron Howard, follows the Bluths, a formerly wealthy, dysfunctional family, who made their money from property development. The Bluth family consists of Michael, his twin sister Lindsay, his older brother Gob, his younger brother Buster, their mother Lucille and father George Sr., Michael's son George Michael, and Lindsay and her husband Tobias' daughter Maeby. In the episode, the family each beg Michael for money when the company funds become unfrozen. George Sr.'s twin brother Oscar shows up to attempt an affair with Lucille, and Michael makes a bad business deal with him. Lindsay protests the Iraq War after her stylist is deployed.

== Plot ==
Michael makes plans for some Bluth Company funds that became available and is approached by family members, each wanting some of that money. Lindsay wants it to start an affair, but Michael suggests she take up charity work again. Lucille wants it to pay for Buster's operation on his clicking jaw, but Michael suggests she stop coddling him. Tobias wants it for acting lessons and Gob just wants it, so Michael suggests Gob and Tobias come up with a business idea to make money themselves. Meanwhile, George Michael spots a man who looks just like George Sr. but with hair and tells Maeby, but she does not believe him. George Sr.'s twin brother Oscar is in town, and George Sr. calls Michael to ask him to give Oscar $10,000, but Michael refuses.

Maeby, working at the banana stand, spots the same man George Michael saw. Lindsay finds out her hair stylist has been called up to serve in the Iraq War and decides to protest the war as her charity work. Michael encounters Gob and Tobias at a coffee shop and assumes they are planning to invest in such a shop, telling them to write a proposal. Oscar comes in after Gob and Tobias leave to ask for money then offer to sell some lemon grove land to Michael. Maeby and George Michael discuss seeing the man they believe is their grandfather in a wig and visit the prison to see if George Sr. is still there. Michael, now aware that the land he purchased is worthless because the government has an easement on it, tries unsuccessfully to contact Oscar. Gob and Tobias approach Michael with their investment idea, "Gobias Industries". Michael, embarrassed about his own poor investment, lies to them and says George Sr. made the deal and that no more investment money is available.

Lindsay joins a group of protesters at a military base, all of whom are herded into a large cage. Meanwhile, Maeby and George Michael mention the lemon grove purchase to George Sr. Michael blames the lemon grove purchase on George Sr. to the Bluth Company board, but a potential whistleblower board member points out that George Sr. cannot legally conduct business from jail. George Sr. calls to discuss the deal with Michael. Lindsay and the protesters gets the attention of some local residents, who hose them down and play loud disco music. All the protesters except Lindsay run off, so she defiantly shouts "no hair for oil" and does a pole dance. Lindsay tells Tobias she wants to be a cage dancer. Michael visits his mother to discuss the bad investment. Lucille comforts him, saying she will "take care of it." She visits Oscar at his trailer in the lemon grove and makes him buy the land back, which he does because he loves her. She uses the money to buy the whistleblower board member off the board and puts herself in his place, solving the Bluth Company's problems but creating a problem for Michael.

== Production ==
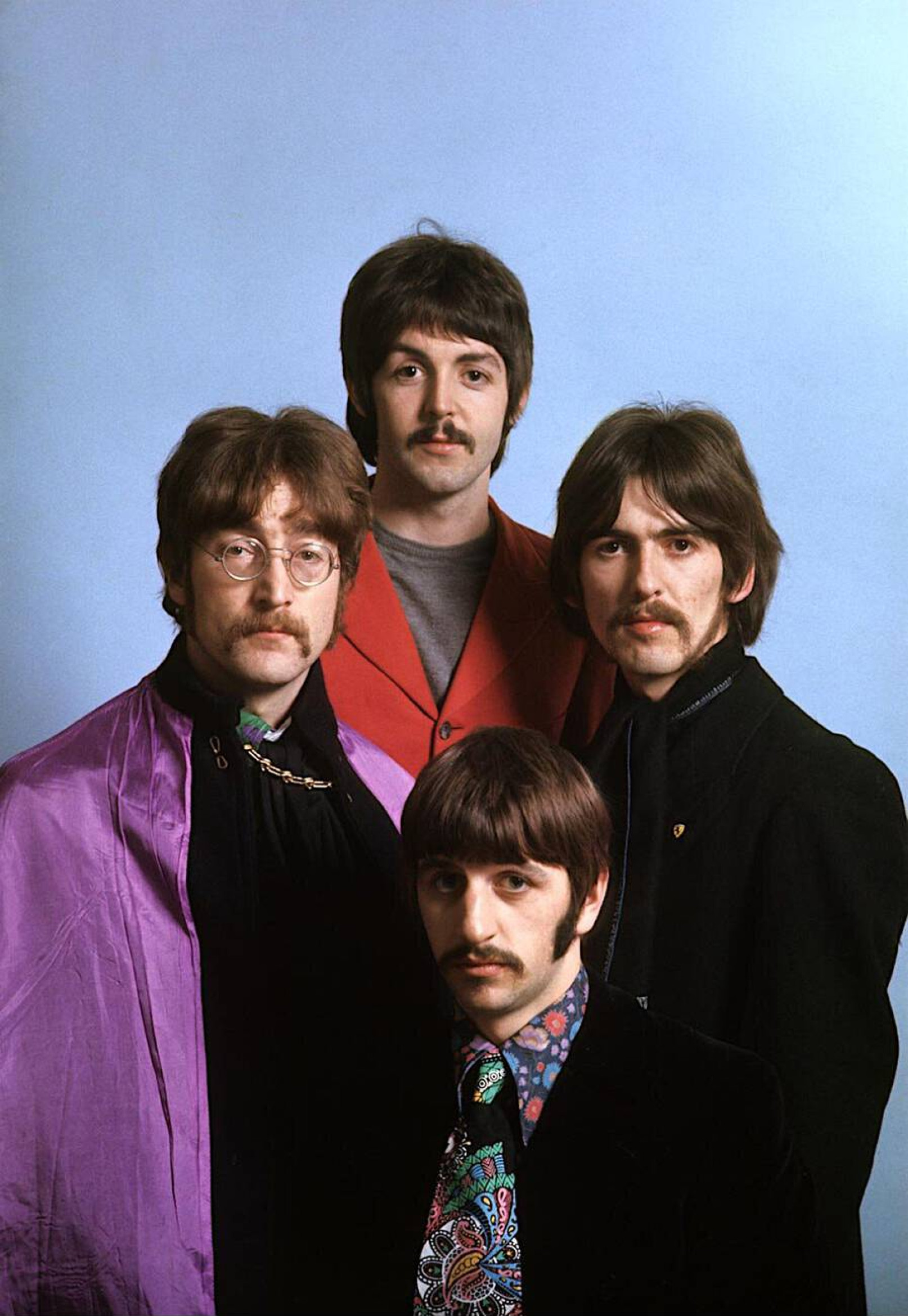
The song "All You Need Is Smiles" is a parody of the Beatles (pictured) song "All You Need is Love".

"Whistler's Mother" was directed by Paul Feig, and written by co-executive producer John Levenstein and consulting producer Jim Vallely. It was Feig's first directing credit, Levenstein's fifth writing credit and Vallely's fourth writing credit. It was the nineteenth episode of the season to be filmed after the pilot, and the seventh of Fox's second episode order for the season.

== Reception ==
=== Viewers ===
In the United States, the episode was watched by 5.39 million viewers on its original broadcast.

=== Critical reception ===
The A.V. Club writer Noel Murray praised the episode, saying while it "isn’t anywhere near as funny overall as “The Best Man For The Gob,” though this episode does contain what is easily one of the best bits in the entire run of Arrested Development: the box of whistles." Murray notes that "What holds “Whistler’s Mother” back a bit is that the main plot-driver is an overfamiliar one for this season: Michael has found new investment capital for The Bluth Company, and his family members are angling to get some for themselves." In 2019, Brian Tallerico from Vulture ranked the episode 50th out of the whole series.
