= Altar Egos (Arrested Development) =

- Arrested Development episode
- Episode no.: Season 1 Episode 17
- Directed by: Jay Chandrasekhar
- Written by: Barbie Feldman Adler
- Cinematography by: Greg Harrington
- Editing by: Lee Haxall
- Production code: 1AJD16
- Original air date: March 17, 2004
- Running time: 22 minutes

Guest appearances
- Julia Louis-Dreyfus as Maggie Lizer; James Lipton as Warden Stefan Gentles; Amy Poehler as Wife of Gob; Jane Lynch as Cindi Lightballoon; Henry Winkler as Barry Zuckerkorn

Episode chronology
← Previous "Missing Kitty"	Next → "Justice Is Blind"
- Arrested Development season 1

"Altar Egos" is the seventeenth episode (Note: The episode is listed as the seventeenth episode of the season on the DVD collection, but originally aired as the sixteenth episode.) of the first season of the American television satirical sitcom Arrested Development. It was written by producer Barbie Feldman Adler and directed by Jay Chandrasekhar. It originally aired on Fox on March 17, 2004, and was the highest watched episode of the series, with 9.62 million viewers.

The series, narrated by Ron Howard, follows the Bluths, a formerly wealthy, dysfunctional family, who made their money from property development. The Bluth family consists of Michael, his twin sister Lindsay, his older brother Gob, his younger brother Buster, their mother Lucille and father George Sr., Michael's son George Michael, and Lindsay and her husband Tobias' daughter Maeby. In the episode, Michael has a deceitful one-night stand with Maggie, a blind prosecutor who is arguing against his father, while Gob marries a woman (Will Arnett's then-wife Amy Poehler) he has just met, and George Sr. uses an undercover FBI agent who has fallen for him for information on the case.

== Plot ==
Michael and the family gather to discuss George Sr.'s upcoming trial. Lawyer Barry Zuckerkorn reveals that they have received a plea offer, which Lucille, speaking for George Sr., wants to accept. Cindi Lightballoon, an undercover FBI agent, falls in love with George Sr. Lindsay receives a letter from Maeby's school saying that her daughter is failing, so she and Tobias hire George Michael to tutor Maeby.

Michael sits down to read the plea, but Gob suggests he have a one-night stand with a lawyer instead. As Michael reads the plea, Maggie Lizer bumps into him, and he introduces himself as "Chareth Cutestory," a maritime lawyer, eventually going home with Maggie. The following morning, Michael realizes that Maggie is blind. George Sr. presses Cindi for information about his case. Lucille catches him and storms away. When Michael comes home, Gob tells him that he has gotten married during a series of escalating dares.

Michael has a second date with Maggie. George Sr. is approached by Cindi, who tells him she knows for a fact he will be set free. It is then revealed, however, that she understood George Sr.'s statement "faith is a fact" as a philosophical assertion, when it was simply a speech error; he meant to say "faith is a facet". At the high school, Maeby pays George Michael to do an essay for her then runs off. George Michael then attends the fundraiser for "Surely Fünke," where he discovers that Maeby has been collecting charity money by posing as a dying girl in a wheelchair. At the courthouse, Michael meets up with his family, but neither he nor Barry have read the plea deal. George Sr. decides to take the plea even though no one has read it, and the hearing gets underway. Maggie is the prosecutor. Michael later visits Maggie, and she hands him the Bluth case file so he can advise her about it.

== Production ==
"Altar Egos" was directed by Jay Chandrasekhar and written by producer Barbie Feldman Adler. It was Chandrasekhar's third directing credit and Feldman Adler's second writing credit. It was the sixteenth episode of the season to be filmed after the pilot, and the fourth of Fox's second episode order for the season.

== Reception ==
=== Viewers ===
In the United States, the episode was watched by 9.62 million viewers on its original broadcast, an all time high for the series, and an increase of over 4 million viewers from the previously aired episode, "Staff Infection".

=== Critical reception ===
The A.V. Club writer Noel Murray praised the episode and its follow up, "Justice Is Blind", saying "they're a prime example of how [Arrested Development]'s writers, cast and crew can sustain an intricate, comedically fertile, largely self-contained story for longer than just 22 minutes." In 2019, Brian Tallerico from Vulture ranked the episode as the 15th best of the whole series, saying it "serves up hysterical performances and characteristically ridiculous plots".
