= Best Man for the Gob =

- Arrested Development episode
- Episode no.: Season 1 Episode 19
- Directed by: Lee Shallat Chemel
- Written by: Mitchell Hurwitz; Richard Rosenstock
- Cinematography by: Greg Harrington
- Editing by: Lee Haxall
- Production code: 1AJD18
- Original air date: April 4, 2004
- Running time: 22 minutes

Guest appearances
- Amy Poehler as Wife of Gob; Michael Hitchcock as Ira Gilligan; Justin Lee as Annyong Bluth; B.W. Gonzalez as Lupe

Episode chronology
| ← Previous "Justice Is Blind" | Next → "Whistler's Mother" |
- Arrested Development season 1

"Best Man for the Gob" is the nineteenth episode of the first season of the American television satirical sitcom Arrested Development. It was written by series creator Mitchell Hurwitz and co-executive producer Richard Rosenstock, and directed by Lee Shallat Chemel. It originally aired on Fox on April 4, 2004.

The series, narrated by Ron Howard, follows the Bluths, a formerly wealthy, dysfunctional family, who made their money from property development. The Bluth family consists of Michael, his twin sister Lindsay, his older brother Gob, his younger brother Buster, their mother Lucille and father George Sr., Michael's son George Michael, and Lindsay and her husband Tobias' daughter Maeby. In the episode, Michael offers to plan Gob a bachelor party after his drunken wedding appears to have stuck. Gob refuses, saying George Sr. is his best man, so Michael tries to plan a fishing trip with George Michael for the same weekend. George Sr. plans to use the party in an elaborate attempt to scare an accountant out of testifying against him. Tobias tries to convince Lindsay to re-form a pharmaceutical-jingle-based family band.

== Plot ==
Michael meets with the company's accountant Ira Gilligan, who informs him that the company is missing money and if asked to testify, he will not lie. George Sr. recently told Gob that getting married was stupid, so Gob hopes Michael can help him get rid of his wife. Tobias comes in with his own problem, wanting Michael's help in recruiting Lindsay and Maeby back into "Dr. Fünke's 100% Natural Good-Time Family Band Solution", a folk band that Tobias set up in the mid-1990s to subsidize his struggling psychiatric practice. Michael asks George Sr. about the missing money. George Sr. says he probably stole it and tells Michael that he will get Gob to try to win Ira Gilligan over so he will not testify against him. The family gathers to welcome Gob's wife at Lucille's apartment, where Buster and Annyong still are not getting along.

Michael tries to convince Lindsay to rejoin Tobias' band, but she declines; however, Maeby is excited, as when her parents are together, they leave her alone. Gob's wife is excited to meet Tobias because she caught a Dr. Fünke performance years ago and loved it. Later, Gob tells Michael he wants to stay married and wants a bachelor party and a wedding with George Sr. as best man. Gob visits George Sr. the next day to discuss the wedding, but George Sr. instead discusses his plan to make their accountant think he has killed a stripper at Gob's bachelor party and blame him for the missing money when he inevitably leaves the country. The Dr. Fünke band reunion does not go well and breaks up when George Michael tries to join in on woodblock. Michael, determined to prove that he is fun, books a fishing trip for himself and George Michael. Lucille hears about Gob's bachelor party and insists he invite Buster.

As Michael and George Michael check into the hotel, Gob and Buster arrive to set up for the party. Meanwhile, the Fünkes prepare for their show, but an unhappy Lindsay walks off, followed by Maeby. George Michael, concerned that he cannot fall asleep with the sun still up, suggests that he go watch the Fünkes' band while Michael drops in on the bachelor party. Gob's wife plays Lindsay's instrument and sings along with Tobias. George Michael joins them on woodblock. At the bachelor party, Ira arrives but refuses to drink. Buster finds the giant cake in the next room and disturbs the narcoleptic stripper within, who bursts from the cake and knocks him out. Michael arrives as Ira sees the stripper run out and realizes that Gob was trying to set him up. He vows to testify against George Sr. In the aftermath, Gob and Michael share a tender, brotherly moment that is interrupted when Gob's wife comes in and says she wants out because she is in love with his brother. Angry at another betrayal, Gob knocks Michael out, only to find that his wife meant his brother-in-law, Tobias. Buster believes he killed Michael, who finds out that Ira had been signatory to the stolen money transfers.

== Production ==
"Best Man for the Gob" was directed by Lee Shallat Chemel, and written by series creator Mitchell Hurwitz and co-executive producer Richard Rosenstock. It was Shallat Chemel's second directing credit, Hurwitz's sixth writing credit and fourth writing credit. It was the eighteenth episode of the season to be filmed after the pilot, and the sixth of Fox's second episode order for the season.

== Reception ==
=== Viewers ===
In the United States, the episode was watched by 5.51 million viewers on its original broadcast.

=== Critical reception ===
The A.V. Club writer Noel Murray praised the episode, saying it is "one of [Arrested Development]’s tightest and funniest, even though—or perhaps because—it doesn’t do much to advance the season’s master-plot." In 2019, Brian Tallerico from Vulture ranked the episode as the 19th best of the whole series, saying "Two equally funny subplots fight for screen time" and "is one of those episodes that’s more over-the-top than most, but the cast makes it work, particularly Tony Hale."
