= Shock and Aww =

- Arrested Development episode
- Episode no.: Season 1 Episode 14
- Directed by: Joe Russo
- Written by: Jim Vallely; Chuck Martin
- Cinematography by: Greg Harrington
- Editing by: Steven Sprung
- Production code: 1AJD13
- Original air date: March 7, 2004
- Running time: 22 minutes

Guest appearances
- Heather Graham as Beth Baerly; Jane Lynch as Cindi Lightballoon; Iqbal Theba as Nazhgalia; Justin Lee as Annyong

Episode chronology
← Previous "Beef Consommé"	Next → "Staff Infection"
- Arrested Development season 1

"Shock and Aww" is the fourteenth episode of the first season of the American television satirical sitcom Arrested Development. It was written by consulting producer Jim Vallely and supervising producer Chuck Martin, and directed by producer Joe Russo. It originally aired on Fox on March 7, 2004.

The series, narrated by Ron Howard, follows the Bluths, a formerly wealthy, dysfunctional family, who made their money from property development. The Bluth family consists of Michael, his twin sister Lindsay, his older brother Gob, his younger brother Buster, their mother Lucille and father George Sr., as well as Michael's son George Michael, and Lindsay and her husband Tobias' daughter Maeby. In the episode, Michael moves on to George Michael's ethics teacher before realizing he and his son share an attraction to her. Lucille's newly adopted Korean son, Annyong, arrives.

== Plot ==
Michael shares his bed with Buster, while George Michael develops a crush on his ethics teacher Beth Baerly. Lucille's adoption application has been accepted, with her accidentally adopting a young Korean boy. Lindsay misinterprets George Michael's crush on his teacher as a desire to set up a date for Michael, who is meeting up with Gob for an unsuccessful double date. Gob's date is an 18-year-old high school student, and Michael's is a masculine woman called Nazhgalia. At a parent-teacher conference, Michael sees Beth and asks her out for a drink. Meanwhile, George Sr. is visited by Cindi Lightballoon, a woman who claims to be a fan of his self-improvement tips.

Lucille calls Michael to say that the Korean boy, named Annyong (Korean for "hello"), is in her apartment. Lucille initially wants to get rid of Annyong, but after noticing Buster's jealousy over Annyong, she decides she will keep him, leading Buster to burn down his room. Michael and Beth have a second date and spend the night together. The next morning Michael sees Nazhgalia just leaving after having spent the night with Gob. George Michael comes down and reveals that he is in love with Beth before Michael can tell him about him and Beth. When George Michael sees Beth come down the stairs, he is devastated, so Michael tells him that Gob slept with her.

Meanwhile, George Sr. prepares for an evening with Cindi, who turns out to be an undercover FBI agent planning to catch George Sr. incriminating himself on tape. She presses him for details, and when he tries to fondle her through the fence, the agents in the surveillance van panic, thinking he has found their camera. Meanwhile, Michael visits Beth to say he cannot see her anymore because George Michael is in love with her. At the school dance, Beth tells Michael he has to tell his son the truth if he wants to see her again, while George Michael confronts Gob about sleeping with Beth. Michael finally tells his son the truth about Beth, and Gob gloats he slept with her too (he actually slept with the much-older civics teacher). Miss Baerly overhears Michael talking to George Michael, decides that Michael is moving too fast, and breaks off all contact, going off with another student.

== Production ==
"Shock and Aww" was directed by producer Joe Russo, and written by consulting producer Jim Vallely and supervising producer Chuck Martin. It was Russo's sixth directing credit, and Vallely and Martin's third writing credits. It was the thirteenth episode of the season to be filmed after the pilot, and the first of Fox's second episode order for the season.

== Reception ==
=== Viewers ===
In the United States, the episode was watched by 6.42 million viewers on its original broadcast, an increase of almost 1 million viewers from the previous episode, "Beef Consommé".

=== Critical reception ===
The A.V. Club writer Noel Murray praised the episode, calling it "littered with those call-forwards", and saying "we start to see more seeds being planted for jokes that won’t pop up for weeks". In 2019, Brian Tallerico from Vulture ranked the episode 45th out of the whole series, saying it "feels like a restart to the season."
