= Joe Russo =

Joe Russo may refer to:

- Joe Russo (baseball) (1944–2019), American baseball coach
- Joe Russo (director) (born 1971), American film and television director
- Joe Russo (musician) (born 1976), American jazz/rock drummer
- Joe Russo (racing driver) (1901–1934), American racecar driver active in the 1930s
