= Justice Is Blind =

- Arrested Development episode
- Episode no.: Season 1 Episode 18
- Directed by: Jay Chandrasekhar
- Written by: Abraham Higginbotham
- Cinematography by: Greg Harrington
- Editing by: Robert Bramwell
- Production code: 1AJD17
- Original air date: March 21, 2004
- Running time: 22 minutes

Guest appearances
- Julia Louis-Dreyfus as Maggie Lizer; Amy Poehler as Wife of Gob; Henry Winkler as Barry Zuckerkorn; Justin Lee as Annyong Bluth

Episode chronology
← Previous "Altar Egos"	Next → "Best Man for the Gob"
- Arrested Development season 1

"Justice is Blind" is the eighteenth episode (Note: The episode is listed as the eighteenth episode of the season on the DVD collection, but originally aired as the seventeenth episode.) of the first season of the American television satirical sitcom Arrested Development. It was written by Abraham Higginbotham and directed by Jay Chandrasekhar. It originally aired on Fox on March 21, 2004.

The series, narrated by Ron Howard, follows the Bluths, a formerly wealthy, dysfunctional family, who made their money from property development. The Bluth family consists of Michael, his twin sister Lindsay, his older brother Gob, his younger brother Buster, their mother Lucille and father George Sr., Michael's son George Michael, and Lindsay and her husband Tobias' daughter Maeby. In the episode, George Sr. wants Gob to sneak into Maggie's house for evidence, but he instead sends Tobias, who breaks in while Maggie is still home, hoping to sneak around her. Michael finds out her seeing-eye dog is blind, so Maggie must have been able to see all this time. George Michael confronts Maeby for posing as a terminally ill twin sister Surely.

== Plot ==
At school, George Michael questions Maeby about her second identity, her ‘twin’ Surely, a wheelchair-using sick girl suffering from "B.S." Meanwhile, Michael wrestles over whether to read Maggie's case file. Gob comes in wanting to destroy the file, but Michael points out that it is merely a list of what the prosecution has against George Sr. Lindsay works on her newest cause of getting the Ten Commandments statue removed from the courthouse. Michael decides to return Maggie's file unopened. Over drinks, Michael confesses his identity to Maggie, who already knew. They agree that they cannot ethically continue their relationship, but Michael goes home with her anyway.

The next day, Michael and Maggie leave her house and encounter a police officer, due to Maggie being needed at the office to interview a surprise witness, Buster. Buster offers inside evidence in exchange for George Sr. being kept in prison and Annyong being sent back to Korea, but Maggie quickly realizes he knows nothing. Michael, left with Maggie's seeing-eye dog Justice, discovers that the dog, not Maggie, is blind. At the prison, George Sr. meets with Gob, Barry Zuckerkorn, and Lucille. Gob had earlier swapped files with Michael, saying there are "boxes of evidence" stashed at Maggie's house. George Sr. says Gob should break in and steal the evidence, but Gob passes the assignment to Tobias.

Tobias sneaks into Maggie's house just as she returns home and runs to the bathroom to put on her perfume to cloak his scent. Maggie, wanting to keep up the charade of being blind, hinders Tobias's attempts to steal the evidence boxes for a while until she finally gets enough and attacks him with a bat. He panics and sprays her eyes with perfume, temporarily blinding her. As the family gathers at the courthouse, Surely Fünke addresses a crowd about injustice, while Lindsay's group cheers the removal of the Ten Commandments. As the statue is lifted out by a crane, it falls on Barry's car. In court, Michael attempts to expose Maggie by throwing the Bible at her, figuring she will instinctively duck and blow her cover, but she still cannot see because of the perfume, so the Bible smacks her in the face and Michael is led away. George Michael decides not to expose Maeby's lie because she credits him as her inspiration. Michael reunites with Maggie. She has decided to drop the blind pretense and say being struck with the Bible has restored her sight. Maggie is replaced with a new prosecutor.

== Production ==
"Justice Is Blind" was directed by Jay Chandrasekhar and written by Abraham Higginbotham. It was Chandrasekhar's fourth and final directing credit, and Higginbotham's second writing credit. It was the seventeenth episode of the season to be filmed after the pilot, and the fifth of Fox's second episode order for the season.

== Reception ==
=== Viewers ===
In the United States, the episode was watched by 7.02 million viewers on its original broadcast, a decrease of over 2 million viewers from the previous episode, "Altar Egos", which had an all time high for the series.

=== Critical reception ===
The A.V. Club writer Noel Murray praised the episode and its predecessor, "Altar Egos", saying "they're a prime example of how [Arrested Development]'s writers, cast and crew can sustain an intricate, comedically fertile, largely self-contained story for longer than just 22 minutes." In 2019, Brian Tallerico from Vulture ranked the episode 37th out of the whole series, saying the subplot "is hilarious in concept, but underdeveloped."
