= Gymnophobia =

Fear of or prejudice against nudity

- Specialty: Psychiatry
- Symptoms: Fear of nudity

Gymnophobia is a fear (phobia) of or prejudice against nudity.

== Symptoms ==
Gymnophobics experience anxiety from nudity, even if they realize their fear is irrational. They may worry about seeing others naked, being seen naked, or both. Their fear may stem from body dysmorphia, trauma, fear of sexual assault, or a general anxiety about sexuality, from a fear that they are physically inferior, or from a fear that their nakedness leaves them body shamed, exposed and unprotected.

Gymnophobia refers to an actual fear of nudity, but most sufferers with the condition learn how to function in general society despite the condition. They may, for example, avoid ill fitted, poor quality and revealing clothes, changing rooms, washrooms, showers, gyms, hostels, hotel rooms, medical facilities, security facilities, pools and beaches. It applies to any place where one-way mirrors and hidden cameras can be put, and phones or recording devices could be used; however, the condition can be regarded as hypochondriasis or an anxiety disorder if the person cannot control the phobia or it is interfering with their daily life and medical examinations.

== Non-medical usage ==
Gymnophobia has also been used to describe those that are prejudiced against naked people or nudists.

== Etymology ==
The term gymnophobia comes from the Greek γυμνός - gumnos, "naked" and φόβος - phobos, "fear". A phobia that has a significant amount of overlap with gymnophobia is dishabiliophobia, which is the fear of undressing in front of others.

== See also ==
- Antisexualism
- Erotophobia
- List of phobias
