= Hering =

Hering may refer to:

- Hering (surname)
- Hering son of Hussa (late 6th century-early 7th century), Bernician prince
- Cia. Hering, a Brazilian textile and retail company

== See also ==
- Häring, a surname
- Haring, a surname
- Harring, a surname
- Herring (disambiguation)
- Ihering
