= Herring (disambiguation) =

The herring is a type of fish. The term may also refer to herring as food.

Herring or Herrings may also refer to:

== People and fictional characters ==
- Herring (surname)
- Herring Shangpliang, Indian football head coach and former player

== Places ==
=== United States ===
- Herring, Iowa, a ghost town
- Herrings, New York
- Herring, West Virginia, an unincorporated community
- Herring Bay, Maryland

=== Antarctica ===
- Herring Nunataks
- Herring Point

=== Multiple ===
- Herring Island (disambiguation)

== Military ==
- Operation Herring, the last World War II combat air drop in Europe
- USS Herring (SS-233), a World War II submarine
- HMS Herring, several Royal Navy ships

== Other uses ==
- Herring Bank, a bank based in Amarillo, Texas
- Herring Hotel, Belle Plaine, Iowa, on the National Register of Historic Places
- Herring Hotel, Amarillo, Texas, on the National Register of Historic Places
- Herring Motor Car Company Building, Polk County, Iowa, on the National Register of Historic Places

== See also ==
- Red herring (disambiguation)
- Battle of the Herrings, a 1429 battle in France
