= Hering (surname) =

Hering is a German surname. Notable people with the surname include:

- Carl Hering (1860-1926), American engineer
- Constantine Hering (1800–1880), German-born American homeopath
- Daniel Webster Hering (1850–1938), American physicist
- Erich Martin Hering (1893–1967), German entomologist
- Ewald Hering (1834–1918), German physiologist
- Frank E. Hering (1874–1943), American football player and coach
- Gottlieb Hering (1887–1945), German Nazi SS extermination camp commandant
- Harold Hering (born 1936), American Air Force officer
- Henry Hering (1874–1949), American sculptor
- Henry Hering (rower) (born 1968), Canadian rower
- Joshua W. Hering (1833–1913), American politician, physician and banker
- Jutta Hering (1924–2011), German film editor
- Jutta Hering-Winckler (born 1948), German lawyer and patron of music
- Kathleen Hering, German bobsledder
- Kristof Hering (born 1989), German singer
- Loy Hering (1484–1564), German Renaissance sculptor
- Mandy Hering (born 1984), German handball player
- Jeanie Hering, pseudonym of Marion Jean Catherine Adams-Acton (1846–1928), Scottish novelist
- Robert Hering (born 1990), German sprinter
- Rudolph Hering (1847–1923), American civil engineer

== See also ==
- Haring (surname)
- Häring
- Ihering
