= National Biscuit Company Building =

National Biscuit Company Building may refer to:

- Biscuit Company Lofts, formerly the National Biscuit Company Building, designated as a Los Angeles Historic-Cultural Monument
- National Biscuit Company Building (Des Moines, Iowa), listed on the National Register of Historic Places in Polk County, Iowa
- National Biscuit Company Building (Houston, Texas), listed on the National Register of Historic Places in Harris County, Texas
