= Red herring (disambiguation) =

A red herring is a figurative expression referring to a logical fallacy in which a clue or piece of information is or is intended to be misleading, or distracting from the actual question.

Red herring may also refer to:

== Animals ==
- Red herring (fish), a type of kipper made from dried, smoked, and salted fish

== Art, entertainment, and media ==
- Red Herring (magazine), a former magazine focused on new technology businesses; now a website devoted to same
- Red Herring, a character in the cartoon series A Pup Named Scooby-Doo
- Red Herring, a 2012 film starring Holly Valance
- Red Herring (play), a 2000 play by Michael Hollinger
- "Red Herring", a trance single by the band Union Jack
- Red Herring Artists, an artist's collective based in Brighton, England
- Boxer James Red Herring was also known in the ring simply as Red Herring.

== Business ==
- Red herring prospectus, a preliminary financial prospectus offering a new stock (in red type)
- Red Herring Surf, a brand of surfwear in Tasmania, Australia

== See also ==
- Red Hairing, an episode of Arrested Development
