= Herring Island (disambiguation) =

Herring Island can refer to:

- Herring Island
- Herring Island (Victoria) in South Yarra, Victoria
- Herring Island (Queen Anne's County, Maryland) in Queen Anne's County, Maryland
- Herring Island (Elk River), in the Elk River, Maryland
- Herring Island (Talbot County, Maryland) in Talbot County, Maryland
