= Häring =

Häring or Haering is a German surname. Notable people with the surname include:

- Bernhard Häring (1912–1998), German theologian
- Hugo Häring (1882–1958), German architect
- Harold Haering (1930–2014), American politician
- Norbert Häring (born 1963), German journalist

== See also ==
- Bad Häring, Austria
- Herink, Czech Republic
- Harring
- Haring
- Hering (disambiguation)
- Hearing, type of sensory perception
