= Haring =

Haring is a surname of Austrian origin. The name may refer to:

== People ==
=== Surname ===
- Abram P. Haring (1840–1915), American soldier and Medal of Honor recipient
- Bas Haring (born 1968), Dutch writer of popular science and children's literature, television presenter and professor
- Bob Haring (1895–1975), American popular music bandleader
- Chris Haring (born 1970), Austrian dancer and choreographer
- Clarence H. Haring (1885–1960), American historian of Latin America
- Florence Haring (born 1985), French tennis player
- Inez M. Haring (1875–1968), American botanist
- John Haring (1739–1809), American lawyer and delegate to the Continental Congress
- José Haring (1940–2023), German Roman Catholic prelate
- Keith Haring (1958–1990), American artist
- Martin Haring (born 1986), Slovak cyclist
- Paul Haring (born 1937), American politician in Texas
- Peter Haring (born 1993), Austrian footballer
- Robin Haring, German epidemiologist
- Ruth Haring (1955–2018), American chess player
- Scott Haring, American game designer

=== Given name ===
- Haring Harinxma (1323–1404), Frisian chieftain

=== Middle name ===
- Firth Haring Fabend, American novelist and historian

=== Variant usage ===
- Tori Haring-Smith, American academic
- Daniël Haringh (1636–1713), 18th-century painter from the Northern Netherlands

== Places ==
- Haring Township, Michigan, a charter township of Wexford County
  - Haring, Michigan, an unincorporated community within Haring Township

== See also ==
- Häring (disambiguation)
- Hering (disambiguation)
- Harring (disambiguation)
- Herring (disambiguation)
- Haring House (disambiguation), historic houses
