= Standard Glass and Paint Company Building =

- U.S. National Register of Historic Places
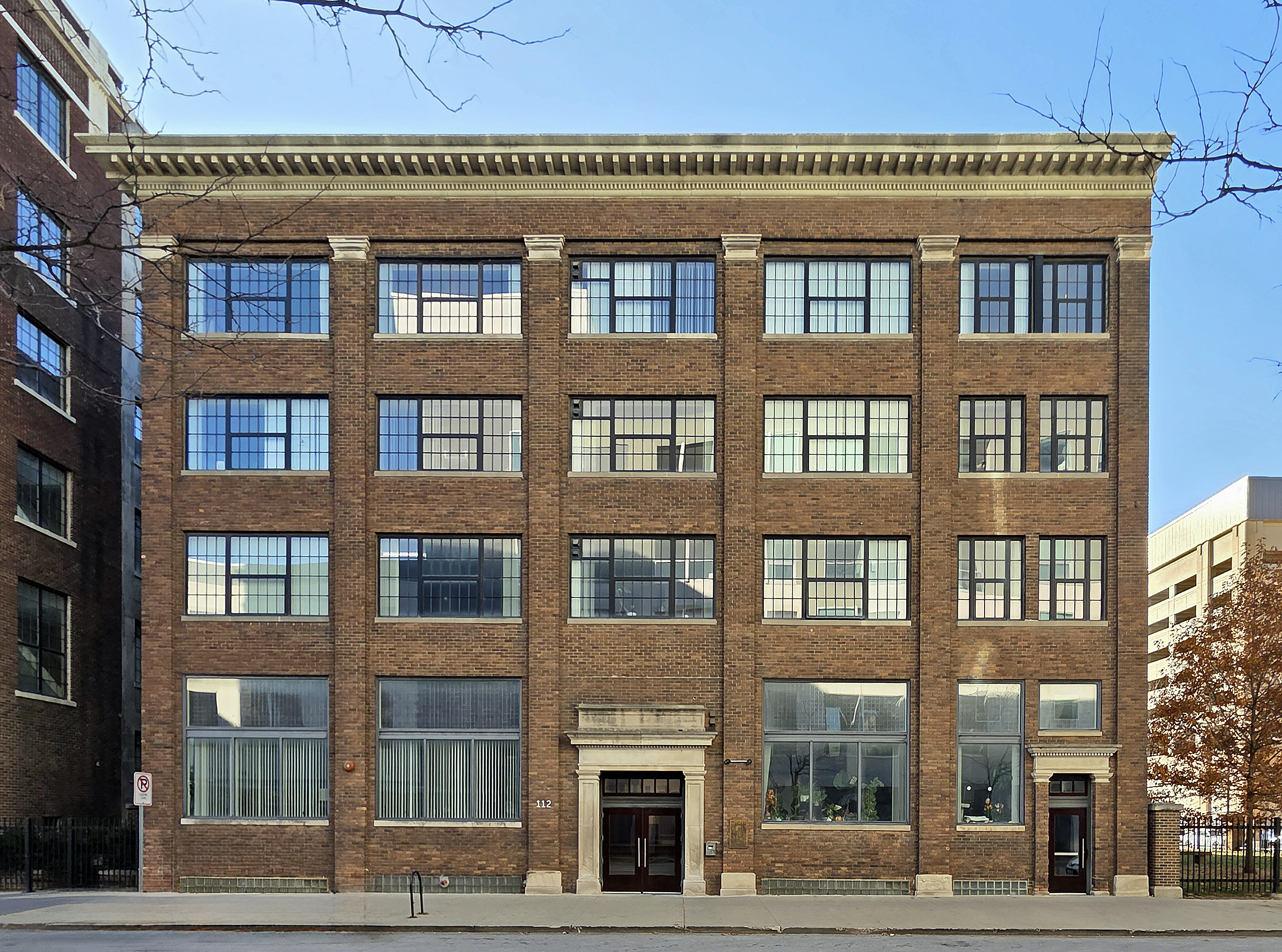
- The Standard Glass and Paint Company Building from the east-northeast

- Location within Iowa Location within the United States
- Location: 112 10th Street, Des Moines, Iowa
- Coordinates: 41°35′0.6″N 93°37′45.8″W
- Area: less than one acre
- Built: 1913
- Built by: J.E. Lovejoy
- Architectural style: Neoclassical
- NRHP reference No.: 04001323
- Added to NRHP: December 6, 2004

The Standard Glass and Paint Company Building, also known as 10th Street Lofts, is a historic building in downtown Des Moines, Iowa, United States. Ashton and Ross Clemens, who were brothers, had the building built in 1913 to house their company, which was said to be the largest glass and paint business west of Chicago. Local contractor J.E. Lovejoy was responsible for its construction. It was one of several warehouse buildings on the southwest corner of the downtown area. Established by the Clemens brothers, Standard Glass and Paint Company was in existence from 1903 to 1979. It was Des Moines' leading wholesale and retail supplier of a variety of building and remodeling supplies. The company remained in this building until the mid-1920s when they moved to the Clemens Automobile Company Building, which was owned by the same family. After it sat empty until 1931 various wholesale companies occupied this building over the succeeding years. Along with the neighboring Herring Motor Car Company Building it has been converted into loft apartments. It was listed on the National Register of Historic Places in 2004.
