= Harring =

Harring is a surname. Notable people with the surname include:

- Harry K. Harring (1871–1928), American zoologist
- Laura Harring (born 1964), Mexican actress
- Michael Harring (born 1979), American film director
- Roger Harring (1932–2021), American football player and coach

== See also ==
- Haring
