= Oak Harbor, Washington =

City in Washington, United States

Oak Harbor
- City
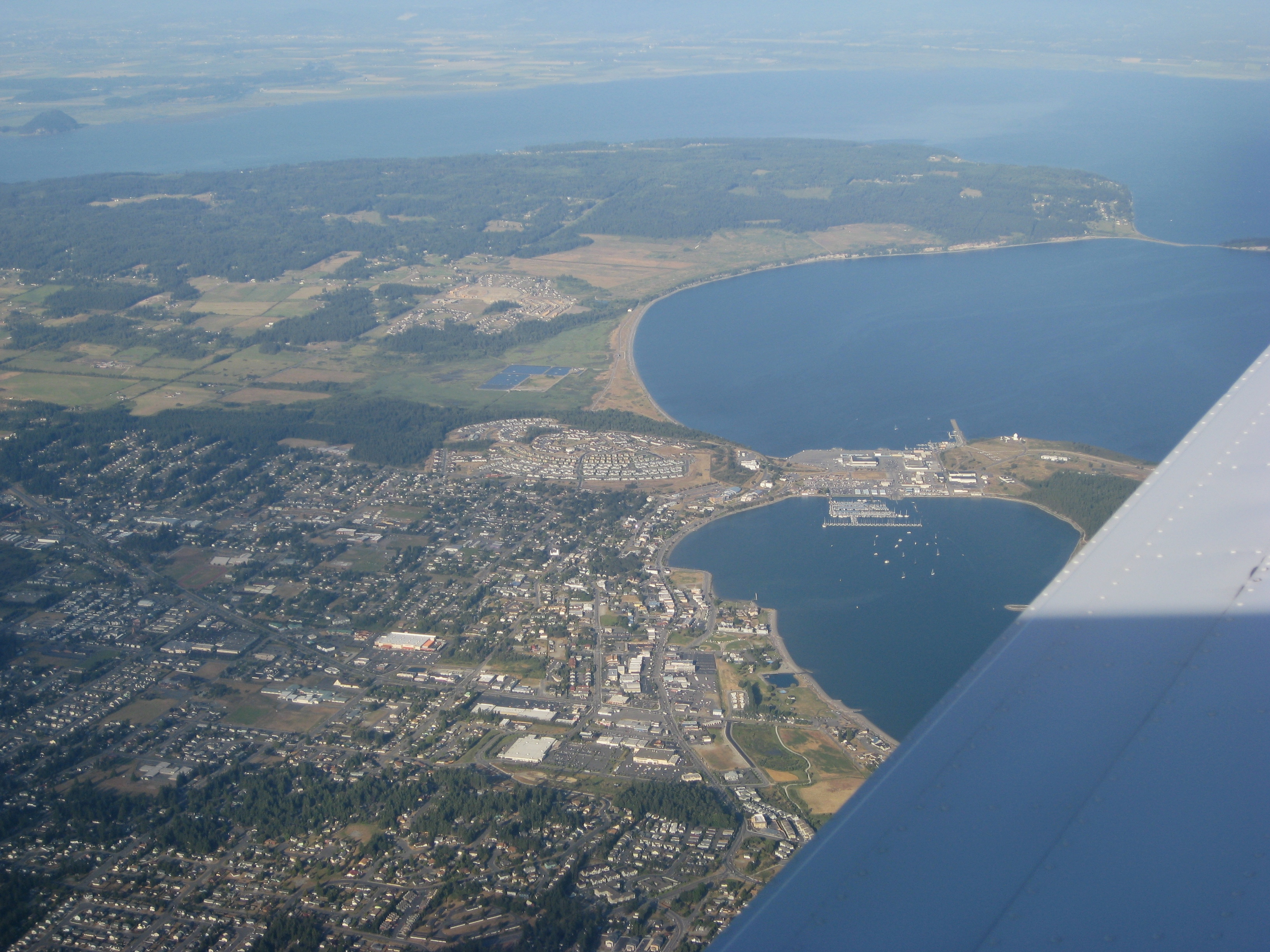
- Aerial view of Oak Harbor

- Location of Oak Harbor, Washington
- Coordinates: 48°17′38″N 122°36′23″W
- Country: United States
- State: Washington
- County: Island
- City: May 14, 1915

Government
  - Type: Mayor–council
  - Mayor: Ronnie Wright

Area
  - City: 12.32 sq mi (31.90 km^{2})
  - Land: 9.65 sq mi (25.00 km^{2})
  - Water: 2.66 sq mi (6.90 km^{2})
- Elevation: 177 ft (54 m)

Population (2020)
  - City: 24,622
  - Density: 2,550.8/sq mi (984.88/km^{2})
  - Metro: 86,857 (US: 48th)
- Demonym: Oak Harborite
- Time zone: UTC-8 (Pacific (PST))
  - Summer (DST): UTC-7 (PDT)
- ZIP Codes: 98277–98278
- Area code(s): 360, 564
- FIPS code: 53-50360
- GNIS feature ID: 2411287
- Website: oakharbor.gov

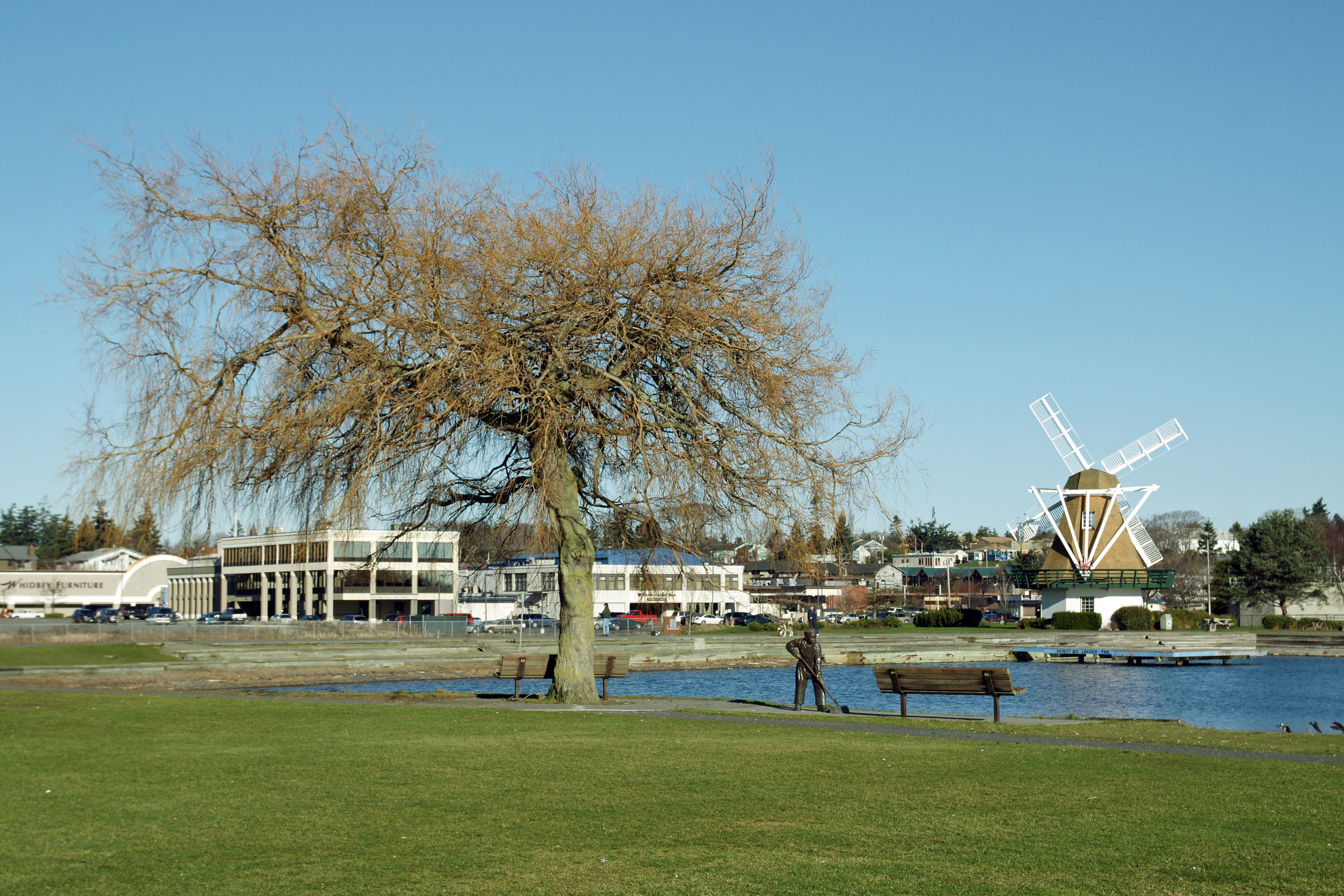
Windjammer Park in Oak Harbor, taken before the windmill seen in the background was torn down.

Oak Harbor is a city located on Northern Whidbey Island in Island County, Washington, United States. The population was 24,622 at the 2020 census. Oak Harbor was incorporated on May 14, 1915.

== History ==
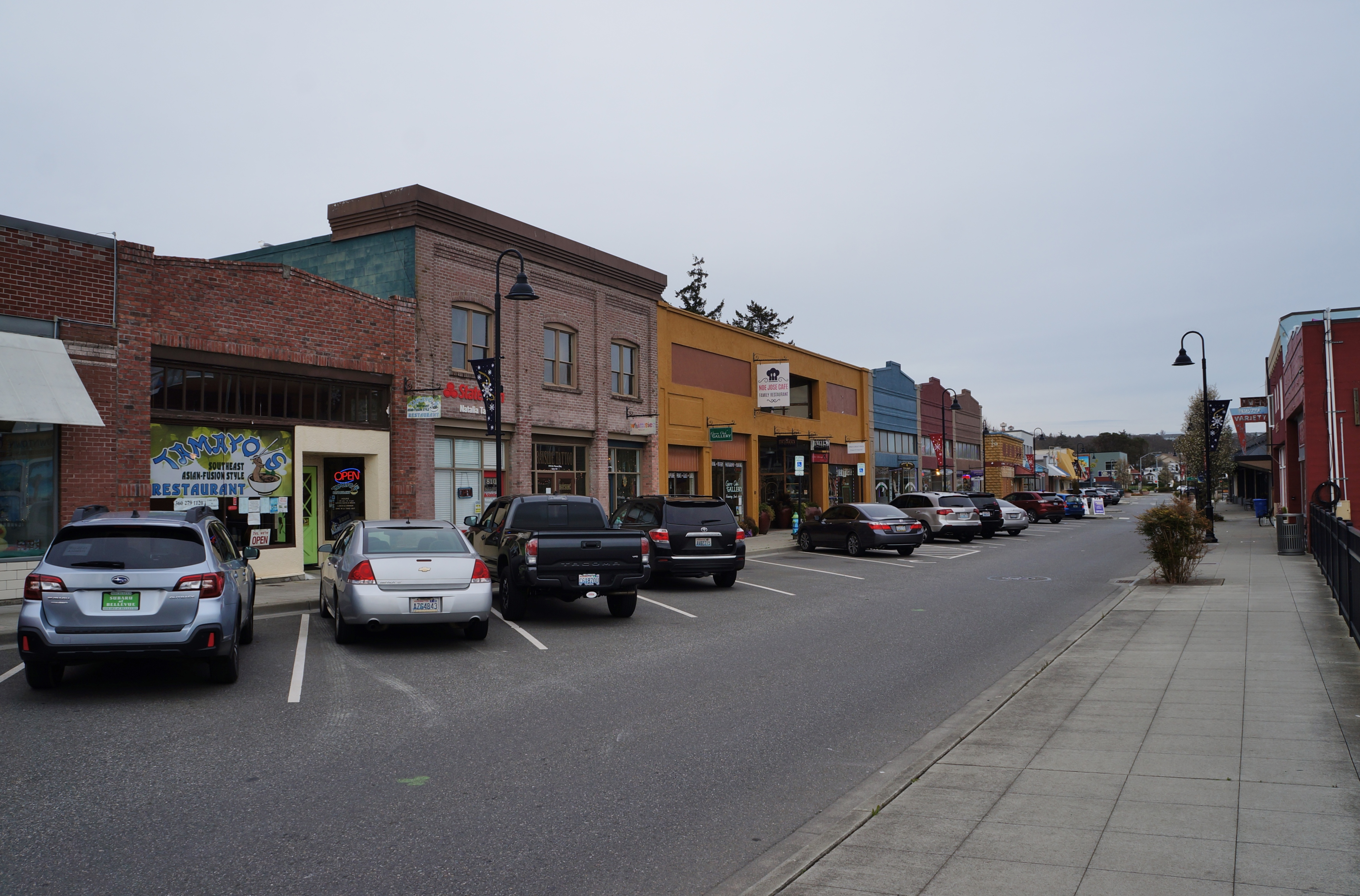
Pioneer Way in downtown Oak Harbor

The Lower Skagit people have inhabited Oak Harbor (Lushootseed: təqucid) and the nearby Crescent Harbor (Lushootseed: č̓itusəb) since time immemorial. There were several villages in the vicinity, and the modern settlement of Oak Harbor was built over one such village.

In the early 1850s, two settlers staked claims where the city now stands—Zakarias Martin Toftezen, a shoemaker from Norway; C.W. Sumner from New England. Irish and Dutch immigrants also arrived and settled in the area. Oak Harbor was named for the area's Garry Oak trees and was incorporated in 1915 with a population of 401. Houses and businesses sprouted up along the shores of Oak Harbor as the pioneers relied entirely on water transportation until the 1900s. For the next 30 years, steamers and freighters carried passengers and freight from the Island to the mainland and back as well as Fidalgo Island to the north. The city grew following the completion of Deception Pass Bridge on July 31, 1935, and Naval Air Station Whidbey Island on September 21, 1942. The bridge, which linked Whidbey Island to Fidalgo Island and the mainland, was a Public Works Administration project built by the Civilian Conservation Corps. A nearby state park with 4,100 acres (17 km^{2}) of forest, campsites, and trails was also developed.

== Geography ==
According to the United States Census Bureau, the city has a total area of 9.47 square miles (24.53 km^{2}), of which 9.42 square miles (24.40 km^{2}) is land and 0.05 square miles (0.13 km^{2}) is water. Access to the island by land is only available by driving through Deception Pass. Other ways to travel to Whidbey Island include flying or utilizing a ferry service. The Mukilteo–Clinton ferry provides service connecting the southern end of Whidbey Island to the area immediately north of Seattle, while the Coupeville-Port Townsend ferry connects to the Olympic peninsula.

Surveys of shorelines throughout the Puget Sound region have indicated that 58% are "unstable". Average retreat rates range from one to eight centimeters per year and shores in the Puget Sound area, composed of unconsolidated sediment, erode 10 to 100 times faster than rocky shoreline.

=== Climate ===
Oak Harbor has a Mediterranean climate (Köppen Csb) characterized by warm, dry summers and cold, though not severe, damp winters. Due to the Olympic rain shadow, the region is much drier than most of the Pacific Northwest west of the Cascades.

Climate data for Oak Harbor, Washington
Month	Jan	Feb	Mar	Apr	May	Jun	Jul	Aug	Sep	Oct	Nov	Dec	Year
Record high °F (°C)	62 (17)	69 (21)	78 (26)	81 (27)	85 (29)	92 (33)	95 (35)	98 (37)	91 (33)	79 (26)	67 (19)	62 (17)	98 (37)
Mean daily maximum °F (°C)	47 (8)	50 (10)	54 (12)	59 (15)	64 (18)	68 (20)	73 (23)	74 (23)	69 (21)	59 (15)	51 (11)	46 (8)	60 (15)
Mean daily minimum °F (°C)	37 (3)	36 (2)	39 (4)	42 (6)	46 (8)	50 (10)	52 (11)	52 (11)	49 (9)	44 (7)	39 (4)	35 (2)	43 (6)
Record low °F (°C)	3 (−16)	5 (−15)	14 (−10)	26 (−3)	28 (−2)	35 (2)	40 (4)	38 (3)	29 (−2)	20 (−7)	6 (−14)	3 (−16)	3 (−16)
Average precipitation inches (mm)	2.50 (64)	1.75 (44)	1.88 (48)	1.67 (42)	1.83 (46)	1.33 (34)	0.86 (22)	0.77 (20)	1.27 (32)	1.97 (50)	3.15 (80)	2.53 (64)	21.51 (546)

== Demographics ==
Historical population
Census	Pop.	Note	%±
1920	337		—
1930	362		7.4%
1940	376		3.9%
1950	1,193		217.3%
1960	3,942		230.4%
1970	9,167		132.5%
1980	12,271		33.9%
1990	17,176		40.0%
2000	19,795		15.2%
2010	22,075		11.5%
2020	24,622		11.5%
U.S. Decennial Census; 2018 Estimate

=== 2020 census ===
As of the 2020 census, Oak Harbor had a population of 24,622. The median age was 31.3 years. 25.8% of residents were under the age of 18 and 12.5% of residents were 65 years of age or older. For every 100 females there were 98.2 males, and for every 100 females age 18 and over there were 95.7 males age 18 and over.

98.8% of residents lived in urban areas, while 1.2% lived in rural areas.

There were 9,532 households in Oak Harbor, of which 36.6% had children under the age of 18 living in them. Of all households, 51.8% were married-couple households, 18.4% were households with a male householder and no spouse or partner present, and 23.8% were households with a female householder and no spouse or partner present. About 26.1% of all households were made up of individuals and 10.0% had someone living alone who was 65 years of age or older.

There were 10,057 housing units, of which 5.2% were vacant. The homeowner vacancy rate was 1.3% and the rental vacancy rate was 5.1%.

Racial composition as of the 2020 census
Race	Number	Percent
White	15,704	63.8%
Black or African American	1,530	6.2%
American Indian and Alaska Native	256	1.0%
Asian	2,524	10.3%
Native Hawaiian and Other Pacific Islander	225	0.9%
Some other race	995	4.0%
Two or more races	3,388	13.8%
Hispanic or Latino (of any race)	3,366	13.7%

=== 2010 census ===
As of the 2010 census, there were 22,075 people, 8,677 households, and 5,789 families living in the city. The population density was 2,343.4 inhabitants per square mile (904.8/km^{2}). There were 9,553 housing units at an average density of 1,014.1 per square mile (391.5/km^{2}). The racial makeup of the city was 72.6% White, 4.9% African American, 0.9% Native American, 10.2% Asian, 1.0% Pacific Islander, 2.7% from other races, and 7.8% from two or more races. Hispanic or Latino residents of any race were 9.3% of the population.

There were 8,677 households, of which 38.6% had children under the age of 18 living with them, 51.7% were married couples living together, 11.4% had a female householder with no husband present, 3.5% had a male householder with no wife present, and 33.3% were non-families. 26.9% of all households were made up of individuals, and 8.5% had someone living alone who was 65 years of age or older. The average household size was 2.53 and the average family size was 3.09.

The median age in the city was 29 years. 28.3% of residents were under the age of 18; 12.3% were between the ages of 18 and 24; 31.9% were from 25 to 44; 17% were from 45 to 64; and 10.3% were 65 years of age or older. The gender makeup of the city was 49.2% male and 50.8% female.

=== 2000 census ===
As of the 2000 census, there were 19,795 people, 7,333 households, and 5,265 families living in the city. The population density was 2,175.0 people per square mile (839.9/km^{2}). There were 7,772 housing units at an average density of 854.0 per square mile (329.8/km^{2}). The racial makeup of the city was 74.9% White, 5.5% African American, 9.6% Asian, 1.2% Native American, 0.8% Pacific Islander, 2.4% from other races, and 5.6% from two or more races. Hispanic or Latino residents of any race were 6.6% of the population.

There were 7,333 households, out of which 43.4% had children under the age of 18 living with them, 59.0% were married couples living together, 9.7% had a female householder with no husband present, and 28.2% were non-families. Also, 22.2% of all households comprised individuals and 7.2% had someone living alone who was 65 years of age or older. The average household size was 2.68 and the average family size was 3.18.

In the city, 31.6% of the population was under the age of 18, 11.6% was from 18 to 24, 34.4% from 25 to 44, 13.4% from 45 to 64, and 9.0% was 65 years of age or older. The median age was 28 years. For every 100 females, there were 98.7 males. For every 100 females age 18 and over, there were 95.2 males.

The median income for a household in the city was $36,641, and the median income for a family was $41,579. Males had a median income of $29,498 versus $21,633 for females. The per capita income for the city was $16,830. About 8.1% of families and 9.3% of the population were below the poverty line, including 11.2% of those under age 18 and 5.4% of those age 65 or over.

== Government ==
Oak Harbor has favored Republican candidates in each presidential election in the 21st century, though by less than a percentage point in 2020. Kamala Harris ultimately flipped the city in 2024.

Oak Harbor city vote by party in presidential elections
Year	Democratic	Republican	Third Parties
2024	49.42% 4,607	47.02% 4,383	3.56% 332
2020	46.81% 4,660	47.53% 4,731	5.66% 563
2016	39.07% 3,006	50.14% 3,857	10.79% 830
2012	42.00% 3,219	53.80% 4,123	4.20% 322
2008	43.21% 3,183	56.79% 4,183	0.00% 0
2004	33.17% 2,226	64.02% 4,296	2.80% 188
2000	37.20% 2,058	57.94% 3,206	4.86% 269

== Education ==
The city is served by the Oak Harbor School District. At the beginning of the 2025-26 school year, there were 5,628 enrolled students in the district, as well as 375 teachers.

== Notable people ==
- Shayla Beesley – actress
- Lamont Brightful – player in the NFL and Canadian Football League
- Michael Harring – filmmaker
- Marti Malloy – Olympic Judo medalist
- Patricia McPherson – actress
- Jerod Turner – golfer
- Chad Veach - evangelical pastor, founder of Zoe Church
- Robert Lee Yates - serial killer
