= Ellen José =

Australian photographer (1951–2017)

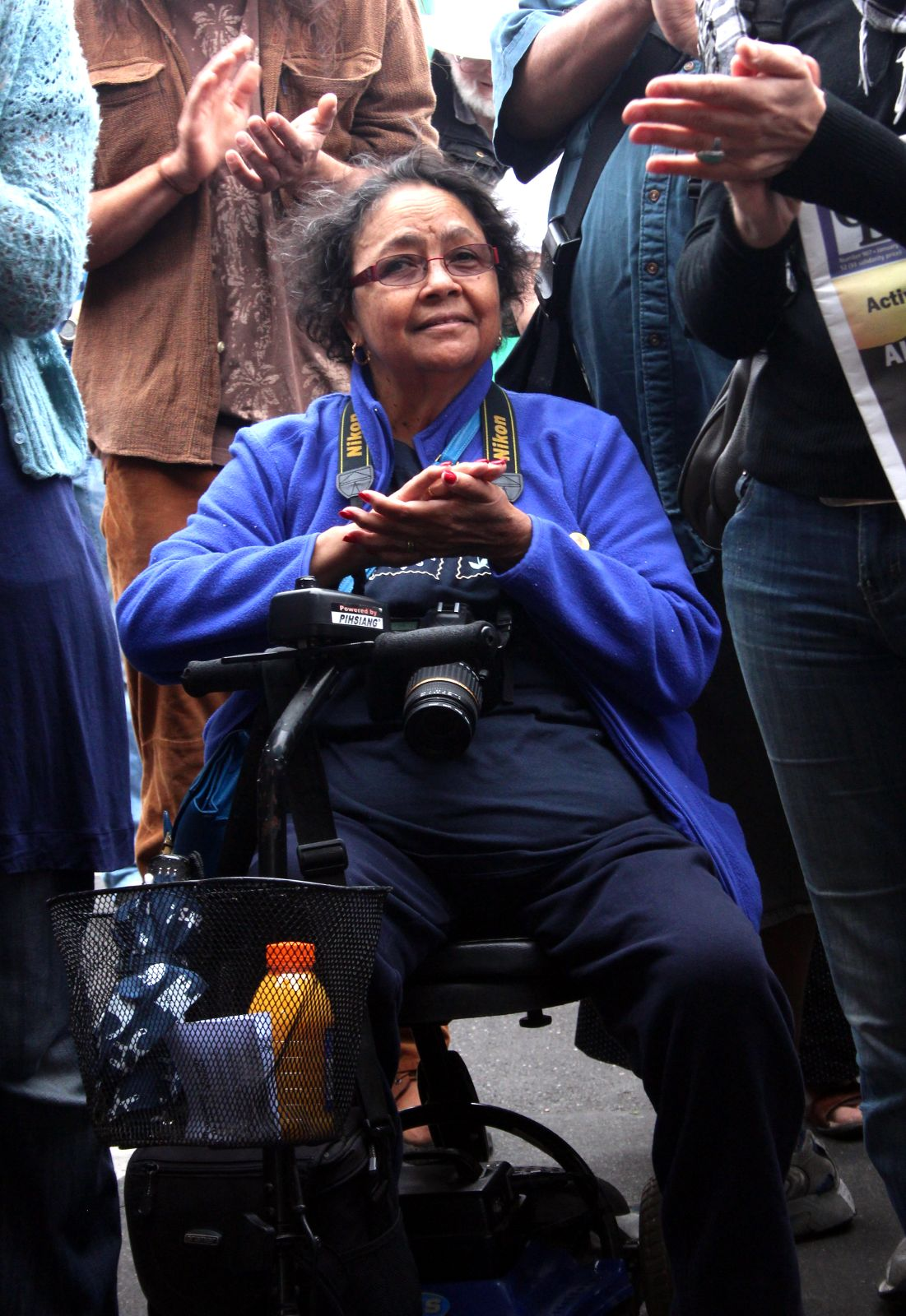
- José in 2012
- Born: 1951; Cairns, Queensland, Australia
- Died: 2 June 2017 (aged 66)

Ellen José (1951 – 2 June 2017) was an Australian Indigenous artist, photographer and anarchist. She was a Torres Strait Islander descendant from Murray, Darnley and Horn Islands who lived in Melbourne with husband and fellow anarchist Joseph Toscano.

== Education and career ==
Ellen José completed a Certificate of Applied Art at Seven Hills Art College, Brisbane in 1976. After moving to Melbourne in 1977 she completed a Diploma of Fine Art at Preston Institute of Technology in 1978. In 1979 she was awarded a Diploma of Education from Melbourne State College.

After graduating Ellen José worked with the Victorian Aboriginal Education Service. She has worked as a lecturer at Monash University (from 1986), Deakin University (1991–1994). In 1996 she was appointed to the Aboriginal and Torres Strait Islander Arts Board of the Australia Council.

== Art and exhibitions ==
Ellen José's photographic and printmaking works are held and exhibited by the National Gallery of Australia, Australian National Gallery, Canberra; Art Gallery of New South Wales, Sydney; Australian War Memorial, Canberra; National Gallery of Victoria, Melbourne; National Museum of Australia, Canberra; State Library of Victoria, Melbourne; State Library of New South Wales, Sydney; and many more collections. Since 1987, José has held around sixteen solo exhibitions, including ten with William Mora Galleries.

In 1986 Ellen José participated in the NAIDOC '86 Exhibition of Aboriginal and Islander Photographers at the Aboriginal Artists Gallery, Sydney. During 1985 and 1986 she contributed distinctive logos and poster designs for the Australian Anarchist Centenary Celebrations held in Melbourne around 1 May 1986.

During 1988 José had photographs included in the Inside Black Australia exhibition that toured Australia.

In 1993 José collaborated with Marshall White on a 2-minute 40-second animation video, In the Balance, incorporating cultural imagery and music from Ellen José's Indigenous background. It was one of the earliest examples of an indigenous artist embracing digital and computer animation for their art.

Her 1997 sculpture Tanderrum can be found in the Herring Island Environmental Sculpture Park, and was restored in January 2008.

From 2002 she attended the 3 December anniversary of the Eureka Rebellion in Ballarat, and photographed the anniversary events.

In 2008 Ellen José featured in an exhibition of modern indigenous art at the Heide Museum of Modern Art in Melbourne . She was also a committee member and photographer of the Tunnerminnerwait and Maulboyheenner Commemoration Committee.

== Legacy ==
=== Ellen José Memorial Foundation ===
The Ellen José Memorial Foundation was established in 2018 to ensure Ellen José's legacy continues. Ellen's wish was to promote reconciliation and to assist young female artists.

=== Ellen José Student Reconciliation Awards ===
Beginning in 2018, the Ellen José Student Reconciliation Awards are aimed at Bayside primary and secondary school students and bring awareness of reconciliation to young people through art and writing. Entrants are asked to interpret "What Reconciliation means through their eyes" in their artwork or writing piece and the finalist pieces are displayed at Bayside City Council.

=== Ellen José Art Award for Young Women ===
In 2022 the inaugural Ellen José Art Award for Young Women was held at Bayside Gallery. It is a triennial, non-acquisitive art award and is a joint initiative of the Ellen José Memorial Foundation and Bayside City Council to promote young female artists (18–35 years) during a critical time in their career.

The finalists for the 2022 Ellen José Art Award for Young Women were Moorina Bonini, Elham Eshraghian-Haakansson, Hannah Gartside, Nadia Hernández, Annika Romeyn and Emma Singer. The awards were judged by Max Delany, Artistic Director & CEO, Australian Centre for Contemporary Art (ACCA) and Professor Marcia Langton AM, Associate Provost at the University of Melbourne, the joint winners were Moorina Bonini and Elham Eshraghian-Haakansson.

The finalists for the 2025 Ellen José Art Award for Young Women are MeiMei Hodgkinson, Clare Jaque Vasquez, Casey Jeffery, Jenna Lee, Amalia Lindo and Jacqui Shelton. The awards are to be judged by Kelly Gellatly, independent curator, and Sophie Gerhard, Curator, Australian and First Nations Art, National Gallery of Victoria.

=== Rising festival ===
In June 2024, Ellen José's work Reach out and touch – distance and time was featured on a "First Peoples Melbourne Art Tram", presented as part of the RISING: festival in Melbourne.

== See also ==
- Anarchism in Australia
