= HMS Herring =

At least three ships of the Royal Navy have borne the name HMS Herring, after the herring, a species of fish:

- HMS Herring (1804) was a 4-gun Ballahoo-class schooner launched in 1804 that foundered in July 1813.
- HMS Herring (1856) was an Albacore-class wooden screw gunboat launched in 1856 and broken up in 1865.
- HMS Herring (T 307) was an anti-submarine warfare trawler launched in December 1942 and sunk in April 1943 in a collision with the French merchant vessel Cassard north-east of Blyth.
