= Michael Harring =

American film director

- Born: January 31, 1979 (age 47); Oak Harbor, Washington
- Occupations: film director, screenwriter, actor, producer
- Years active: 2001-present

Michael Harring (born January 31, 1979) is an American independent filmmaker, sometimes associated with the independent film movement known as "Mumblecore". His films include Cardinal (2001), Driving Around, Following Strangers (2005), Small Little Thing (2006), and the feature The Mountain, the River and the Road (2009).

== Biography ==
Michael Harring was born in Oak Harbor, Washington, and currently resides in Seattle, WA.

== Filmography (as director) ==
- The Mountain, the River and the Road (2009)
- Small Little Thing (2006)
- Driving Around, Following Strangers (2005)
- Cardinal (2001)
