= Harry K. Harring =

American zoologist

Harry K. Harring (1871–1928) was a zoologist specializing in the study of Rotatoria. He was born in Nykjobing, Denmark and emigrated to the United States in 1893. He wrote The Rotifers of Wisconsin with Frank Jacob Myers. He was awarded the honorary title of Custodian of the Rotatoria in the Division of Marine Invertebrates of the United States National Museum (USNM) in 1914.
