= Red Herring Surf =

Retail company in Tasmania, Australia

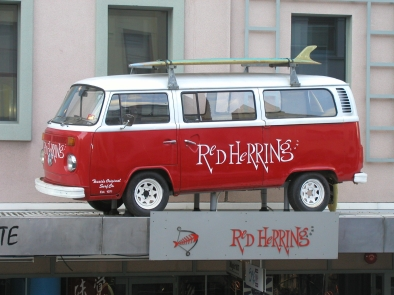
Red Herring Headquarters

Red Herring Surf is a brand of surfwear in Tasmania, Australia. It is strongly involved in local youth culture, sponsoring a local band and taking part in surf events. Tasmanian surfer Bill Thwaites founded the company in 1971, originally naming his store Seaworld. The store name was changed to its present form as more stores opened in the 1990s. Red Herring Surf was the first surf store opened in Tasmania, and now has over fifty employees. Since beginning operation in Hobart in 1971, the company has expanded with four stores now open, within the cities of Burnie, Launceston, Glenorchy, and Hobart.
