= Kathleen Hering =

German bobsledder

Medal record

Women's Bobsleigh

Representing Germany

World Championships
Gold medal – first place	2000 Winterberg	Two-woman

Kathleen Hering (born 24 June 1976) is a German bobsledder who competed in the late 1990s and early 2000s. She won the gold medal in the debut two-woman event at the 2000 FIBT World Championships in Winterberg.

She was also an accomplished discus thrower, winning a silver medal in that event at the 1997 European U23 Championships.
