= Red Herring Artists =

Artists' collective based in Brighton and Hove, England

Red Herring is an artists' collective based in Brighton and Hove, England, founded in 1984. It is a non-profit making company, the group was set up to provide affordable Studio space for artists with the aim of increasing public awareness of the visual arts. In keeping with its aims the group has always sought to achieve a balance of varied practises across the arts and crafts, and a balance of gender.

== Background ==
Red Herring was founded in 1984 and opened its first studios in 1985.

As part of its stated aims, Red Herring Studios has provided affordable studio space for professional artists. This has been achieved by renting available industrial and commercial premises (previously, often identified for redevelopment) and dividing the space provided into working areas. In the past, in order to encourage cross disciplinary discussion, interaction and collaboration individual artists' spaces have been kept open and interconnected.

In 1993 the studio group became an Industrial and provident society with charity-like structure and aims. The studio group is funded by its members, in the form of subscriptions for the use of space and is run on a voluntary basis by the members.

Throughout the first decade the Red Herring ran a gallery space within its premises, this was discontinued when several members set up Fabrica, an artist-run contemporary art gallery and commissioner of new work, housed in the former Holy Trinity Church in Brighton City centre.

In 2017 Red Herring were faced with eviction from their Westerman Complex home in Hove, when plans were made to demolish it and build houses on the site. They found a new site in the suburb of Portslade in January 2019.

== Artists ==
From its inception in 1985, Red Herring moved between different premises in Brighton & Hove and the membership consequently varied in number, from approximately 33 to 16. Over the years it has housed several hundred artists as members.

The term "Red Herring Artists" refers both to individual members and the Artists group as a whole. As a group Red Herring Artists have been involved in countless collaborations and group projects, many of which are public art projects and festival events.

In October 2020 Red Herring artists designed and created a mural in Wish Park, Hove, celebrating the work of NHS staff during the COVID-19 pandemic.
