= Herring Motor Car Company Building =

- U.S. National Register of Historic Places
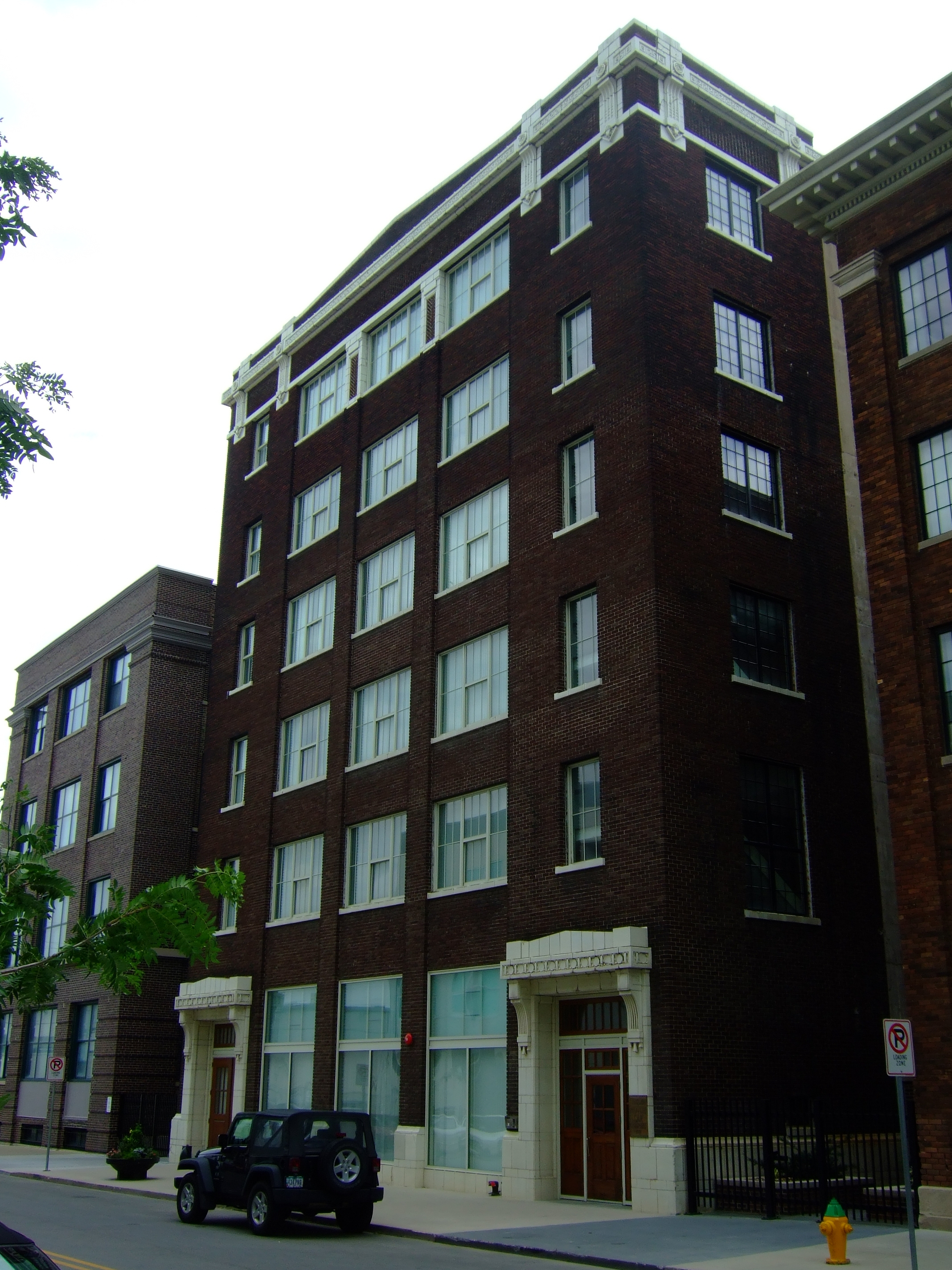

- Location within Iowa Location within the United States
- Location: 110 W. 10th St. Des Moines, Iowa
- Coordinates: 41°34′59.8″N 93°37′45.5″W
- Area: less than one acre
- Built: 1912-1913
- Architect: Proudfoot, Bird & Rawson
- Architectural style: Classical Revival
- NRHP reference No.: 04001325
- Added to NRHP: December 6, 2004

The Herring Motor Car Company Building, now known as 10th Street Lofts, is a historic building located in downtown Des Moines, Iowa. The building is a six-story brick structure rising 90 feet (27 m) tall. It was designed by the Des Moines architectural firm of Proudfoot, Bird & Rawson in the Classical Revival style. Clyde L. Herring had the building built in 1912 and it was completed the following year. It was originally a four-story building with two more floors added 18 months after it was originally built. By 1915, the company was building 32 Ford automobiles a day, and had delivered “more automobiles than any other one automobile agency in the United States.” Along with the neighboring Standard Glass and Paint Company Building, today it is part of the same loft apartment complex. The National Biscuit Company Building on the other side of the building has likewise been converted into an apartment building. It was listed on the National Register of Historic Places in 2004.
