= Herring Island (Elk River) =

Island in Maryland, United States

Herring
- Location within Maryland

Geography
- Location: Elk River
- Coordinates: 39°30′59″N 75°52′30″W
- Area: 2 ha (4.9 acres)
- Highest elevation: 1 m (3 ft)

Administration
- United States
- State: Maryland

Herring Island is a private island in Randalia, Cecil County, Maryland. It has played a considerable role in local history, with local native tribes hunting there and the English camping there during the War of 1812.

Herring Island formed during the 17th century with the erosion of Herring Creek's peninsula into an island. From the early 20th century until the 1970s it was a Boy Scout camp, consisting of numerous log cabins. Following a fire that destroyed the main cabin the property was purchased by a family, and has been a private residence since.
