= Herink =

- Municipality
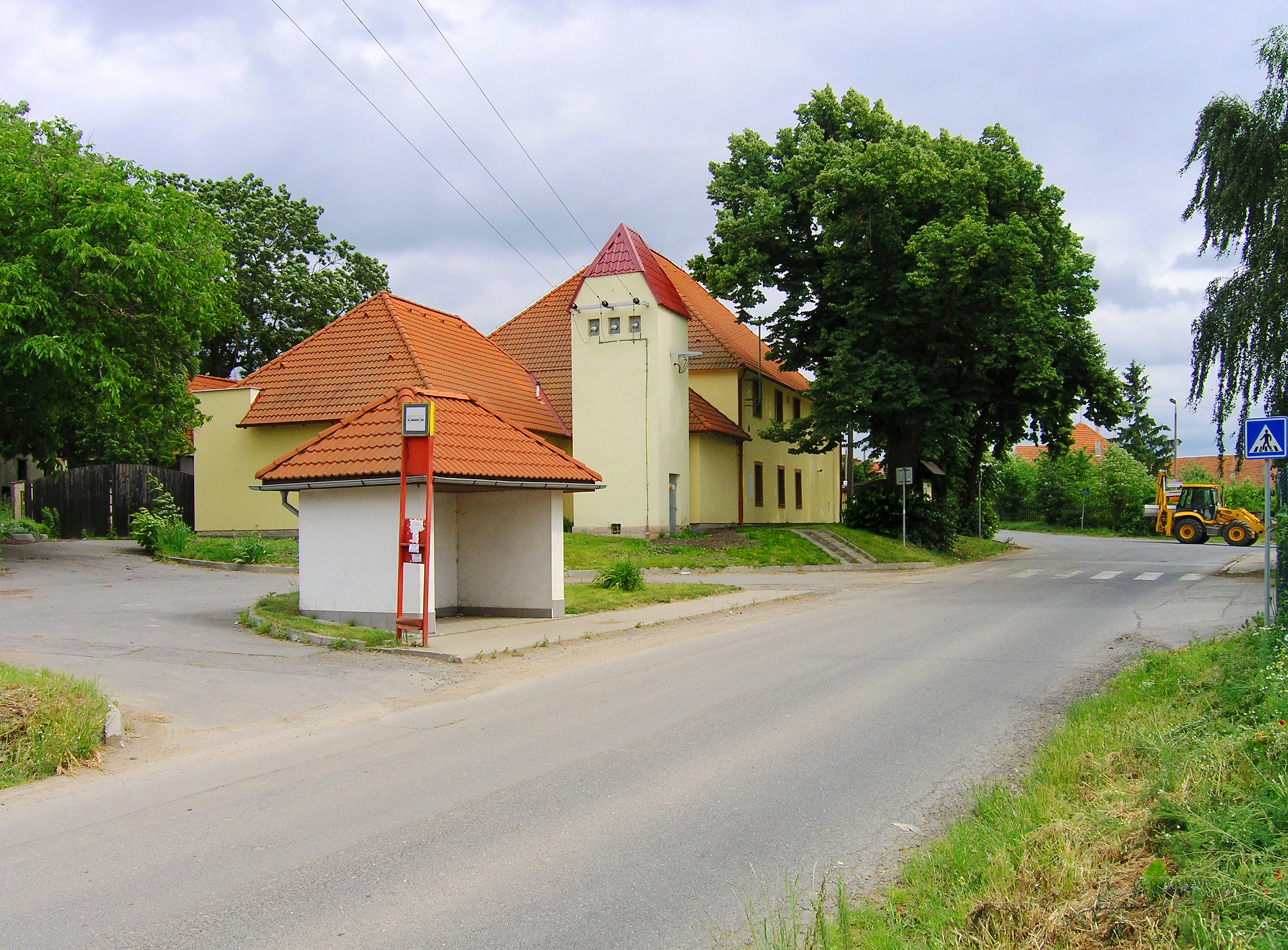
- Common in Herink

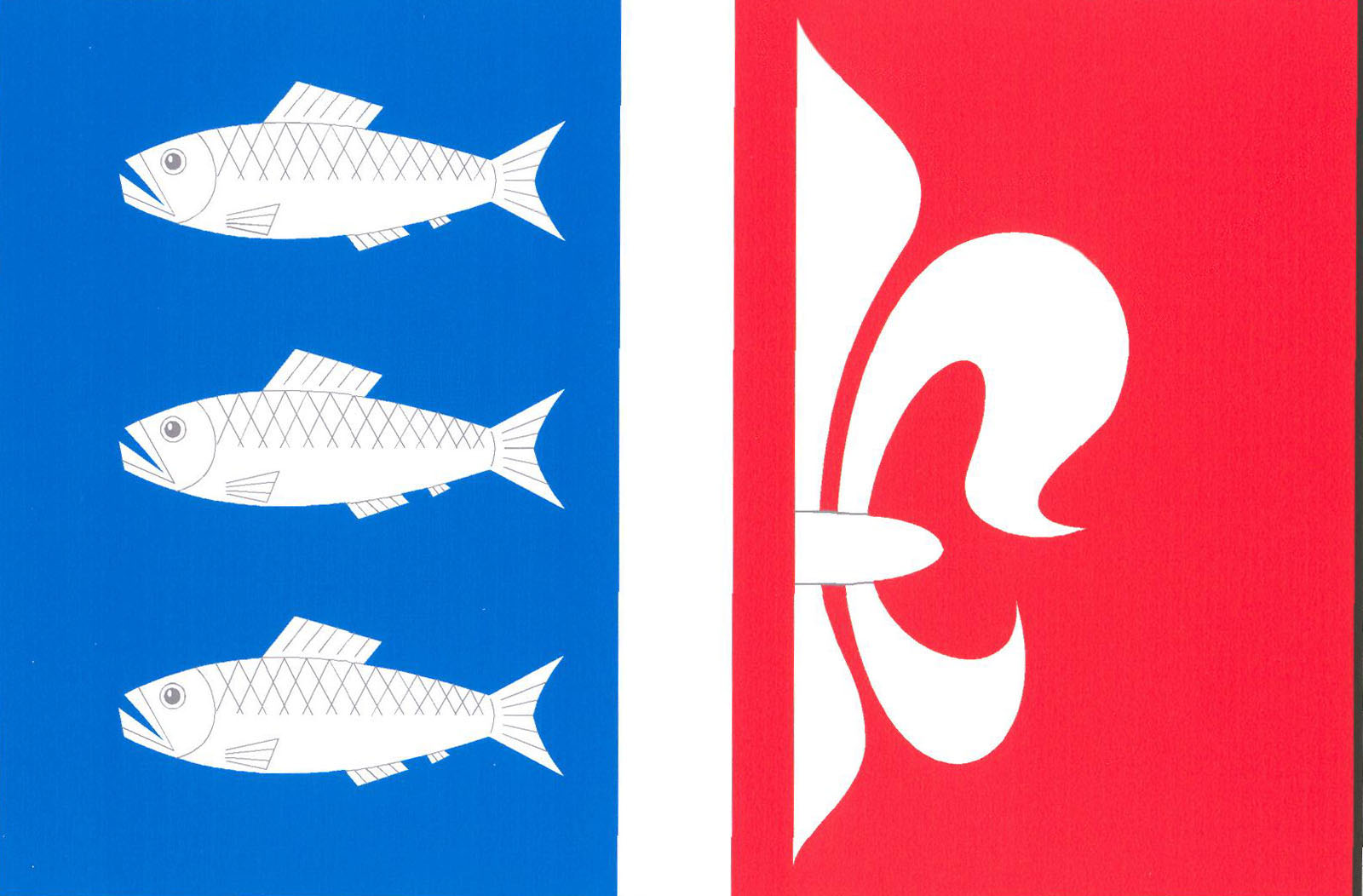
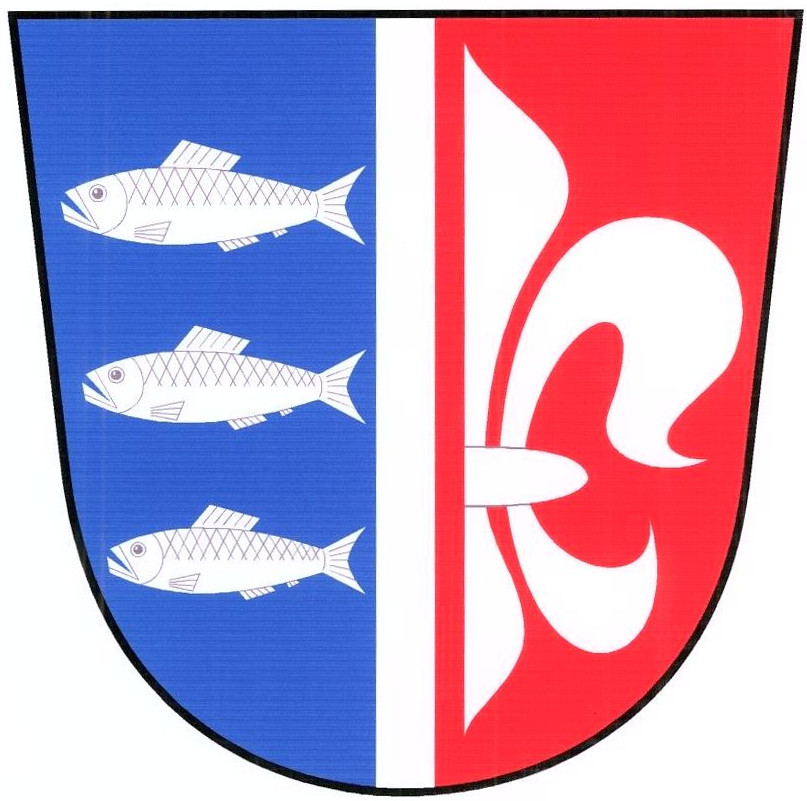
- Flag Coat of arms

- Location in the Czech Republic
- Coordinates: 49°58′0″N 14°34′30″E
- Country: Czech Republic
- Region: Central Bohemian
- District: Prague-East
- First mentioned: 1422

Area
  - Total: 2.74 km^{2} (1.06 sq mi)
- Elevation: 362 m (1,188 ft)

Population (2026-01-01)
  - Total: 1,215
  - Density: 443/km^{2} (1,150/sq mi)
- Time zone: UTC+1 (CET)
  - Summer (DST): UTC+2 (CEST)
- Postal code: 251 70
- Website: www.herink.cz

Herink is a municipality and village in Prague-East District in the Central Bohemian Region of the Czech Republic. It has about 1,200 inhabitants. In the 21st century, it is one of the fastest-growing municipalities in the country.

== Etymology ==
The village was named after a settled whose surname was Hering.

== Geography ==
Herink is located about 10 kilometres (6 mi) southeast of Prague. It lies in an agricultural landscape on the border between the Prague Plateau and Benešov Uplands. The highest point is at 417 m (1,368 ft) above sea level.

== History ==
The first written mention of Herink is from 1422.

== Demographics ==
In 2001, Herink had 72 inhabitants and therefore it is one of the fastest-growing municipalities in the country in the 21st century.

Historical population

Year	Pop.	±%
1869	166	—
1880	162	−2.4%
1890	161	−0.6%
1900	175	+8.7%
1910	154	−12.0%

Year	Pop.	±%
1921	164	+6.5%
1930	167	+1.8%
1950	109	−34.7%
1961	111	+1.8%
1970	93	−16.2%

Year	Pop.	±%
1980	88	−5.4%
1991	75	−14.8%
2001	72	−4.0%
2011	417	+479.2%
2021	1,106	+165.2%

Source: Censuses

== Transport ==
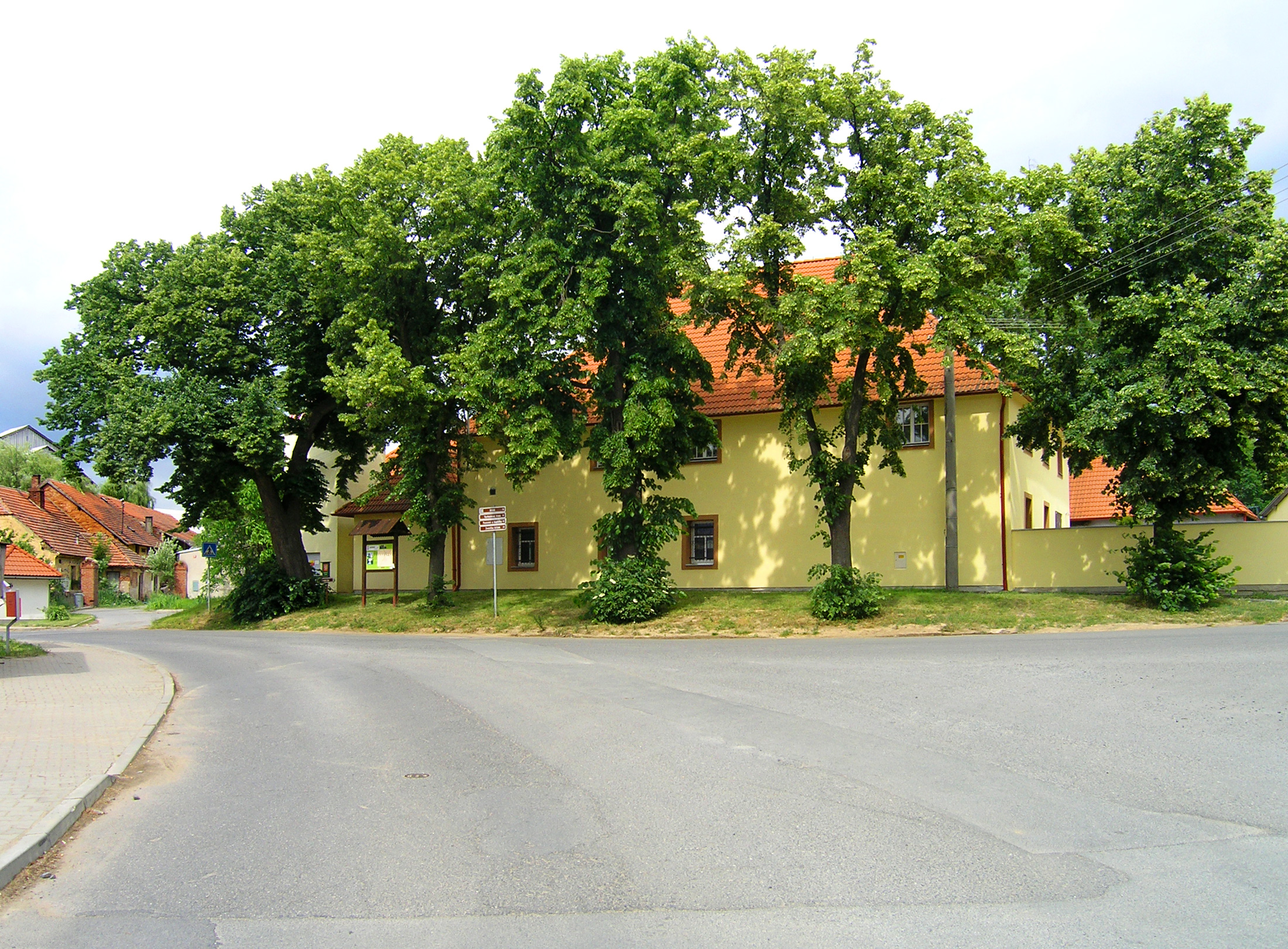
Protected linden tree

The D0 motorway (part of the European route E50) runs through the municipal territory.

== Sights ==
There are no protected cultural monuments in the municipality.
