= Ihering =

Ihering is a surname. Notable people with the surname include:

- Hermann von Ihering (1850–1930), German-Brazilian naturalist
- Herbert Ihering (1888–1977), German theater critic
- Rodolpho von Ihering (1883–1939) Brazilian zoologist, son of Hermann von Ihering
- Rudolf von Jhering (1818–1892), German jurist

== See also ==
- Jhering
- Hering (surname)
