= Herring Hotel (Belle Plaine, Iowa) =

- U.S. National Register of Historic Places
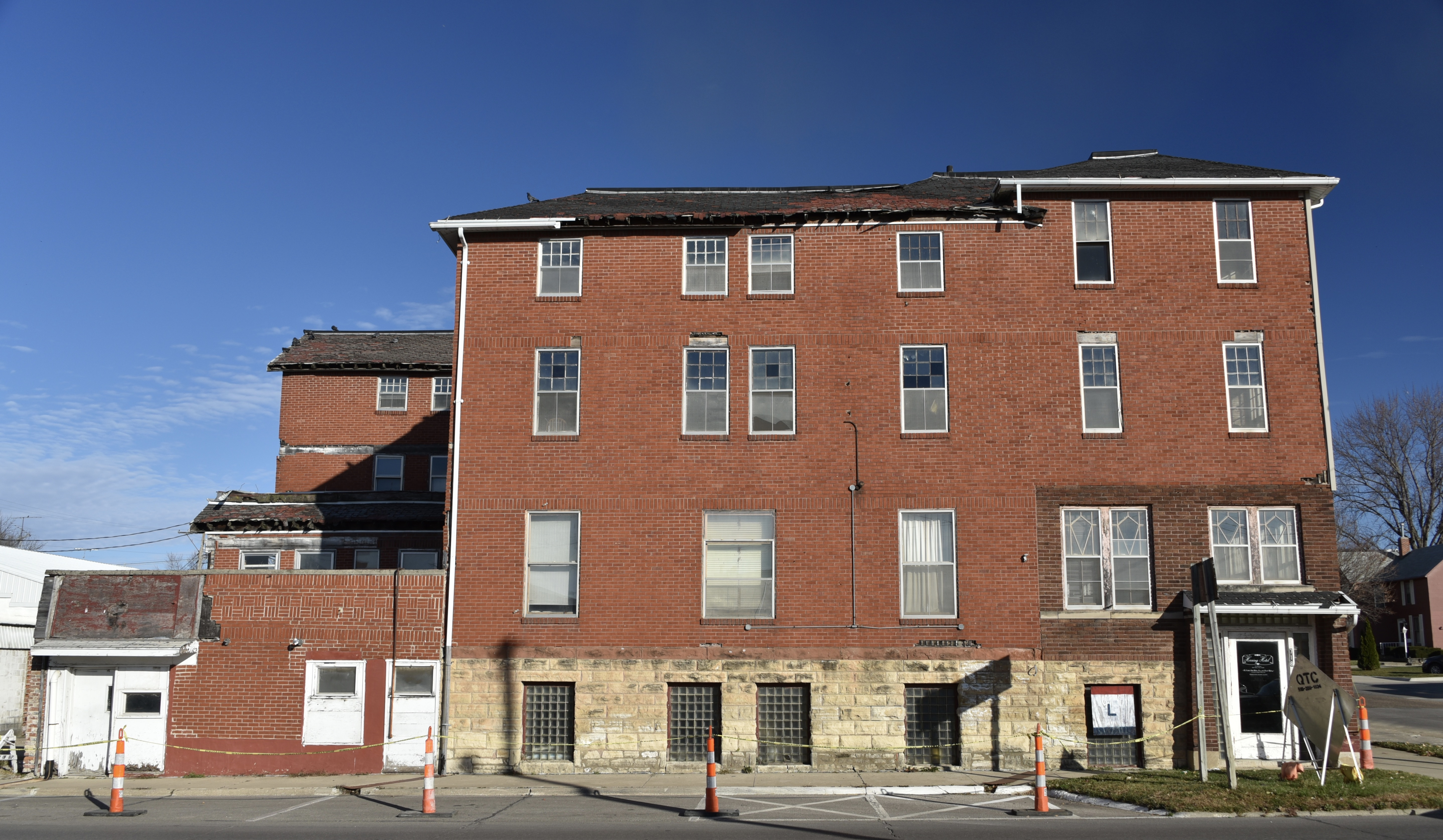

- Location within Iowa Location within the United States
- Location: 718 13th St. Belle Plaine, Iowa
- Coordinates: 41°53′50″N 92°16′36″W
- Built: 1900
- Built by: James Park
- Architect: Charles A. Dieman
- Architectural style: American Craftsman
- NRHP reference No.: 08001250
- Added to NRHP: December 31, 2008

The Herring Hotel, also known as the Herring Cottage, The Herring, Hotel Herring, and The Graham House Hotel, is a historic building located in Belle Plaine, Iowa, United States. Built in 1900, the American Craftsman style frame building replaced an earlier hotel with the same name that had been destroyed in a massive fire that destroyed most of the central business district in 1894. Will Herring built his namesake hotel and he had owned the previous hotel, which had been built by his father-in-law William Blossom as the Tremont House. The building was designed by Cedar Rapids architect Charles A. Dieman, and constructed by local contractor James Park.

The hotel served passengers from the Chicago and North Western Railroad depot two blocks away. Motorists on the Lincoln Highway, which was routed by the hotel, would also use the hotel after it was established in 1913. This hotel was also the victim of a fire in 1914, which destroyed the attic and roof. The third floor was added during the renovations. Herring built a service station next door in 1919, making this a one-stop roadside business. Additions were made to the station later on to house his son Edward's car dealership. U.S. Route 30 was routed along the Lincoln Highway in 1926, and motorist from that highway continued to stay here until 1937 when the highway was routed north of town. An indoor garage that could house up to thirty autos was added in 1927. Will Herring, who was known for his exceptional service, died in 1937. The faux brick veneer was added to the building sometime in the 1940s to early 1950s. The Herring family continued to own the hotel until 1960, although others ran it. The building, which is still a hotel, was listed on the National Register of Historic Places in 2008.
