= National Biscuit Company Building (Des Moines, Iowa) =

- U.S. National Register of Historic Places
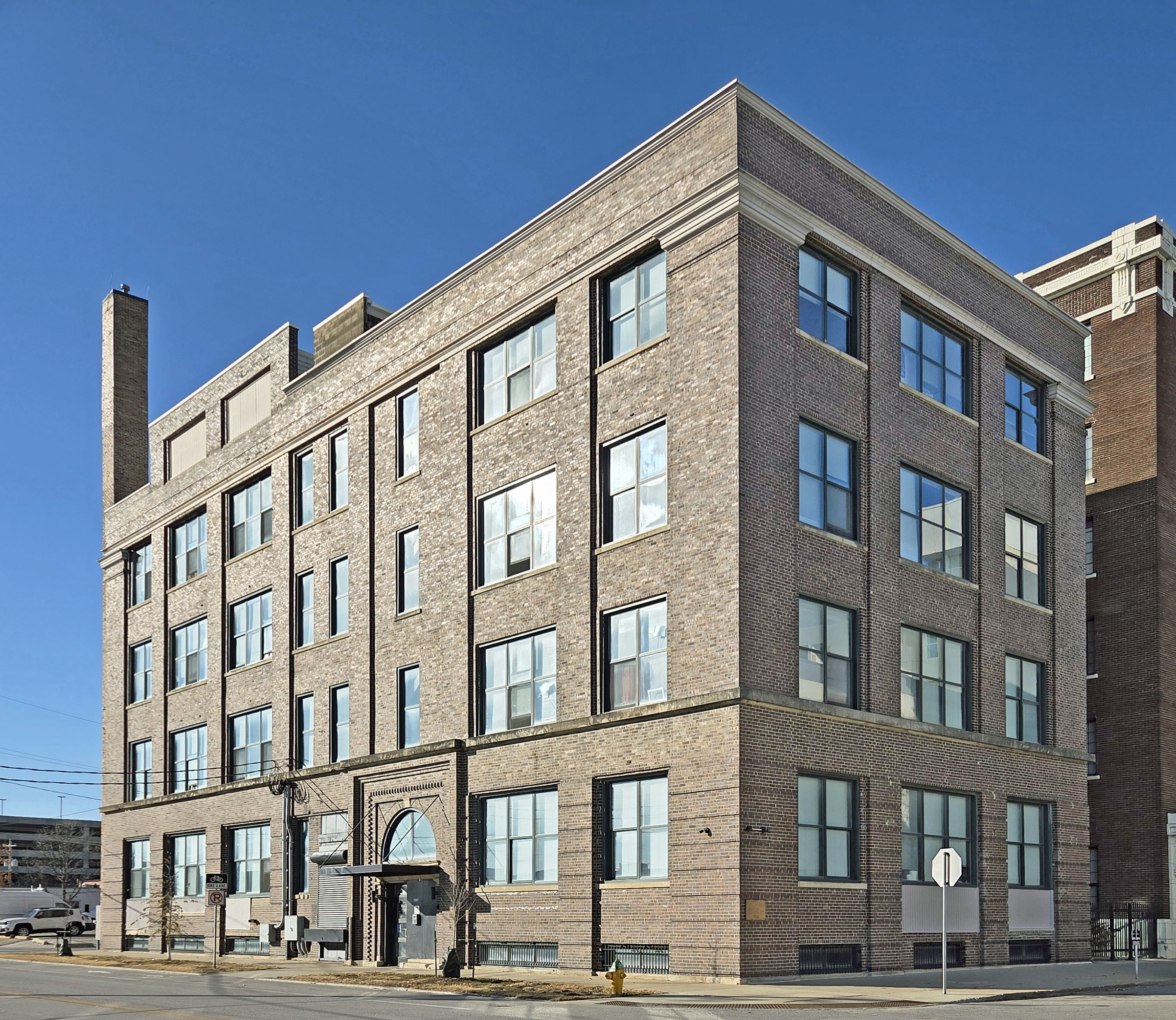
- The National Biscuit Company Building from the east

- Location within Iowa Location within the United States
- Location: 1001 Cherry St. Des Moines, Iowa
- Coordinates: 41°34′59″N 93°37′45″W
- Area: less than one acre
- Built: 1906
- Built by: Benson & Marxer
- Architect: William F. Wilmouth
- Architectural style: Classical Revival
- NRHP reference No.: 09000273
- Added to NRHP: May 6, 2009

The National Biscuit Company Building, also known as National Biscuit Company Flats, is a historic building located in downtown Des Moines, Iowa, United States. The heavy timber and masonry building was built in 1906. Only half of the planned building was completed, and the north half of the property was later sold. It initially served as a production and distribution facility for the National Biscuit Company. Architect William F. Wilmouth, who designed the company's buildings, is presumed to be the architect of this four-story Neoclassical building. Benson & Marxer served as the contractors. Des Moines was the third largest sales territory for the company. It was one of a few bakeries in the company that produced the Uneeda Biscuit, and it was one of three that produced a corn cracker in the mid-1920s.

The National Baking Company would use this building until 1940. Boyt Harness Company, Firestone Tire and Rubber Company, and Look magazine used it for a warehouse. Carpenter's Local #106 acquired the building in 1981 and used it for meetings and as a place to train apprentices. In 1995 the building was converted into a 54-unit apartment building. The neighboring Herring Motor Car Company Building has also been converted into loft apartments. It was listed on the National Register of Historic Places in 2004.

== See also ==
- National Biscuit Company Building (Houston)
- National Register of Historic Places listings in Des Moines, Iowa
