= National Biscuit Company Building (Houston) =

Historic building in Houston, Texas, U.S.

- U.S. National Register of Historic Places
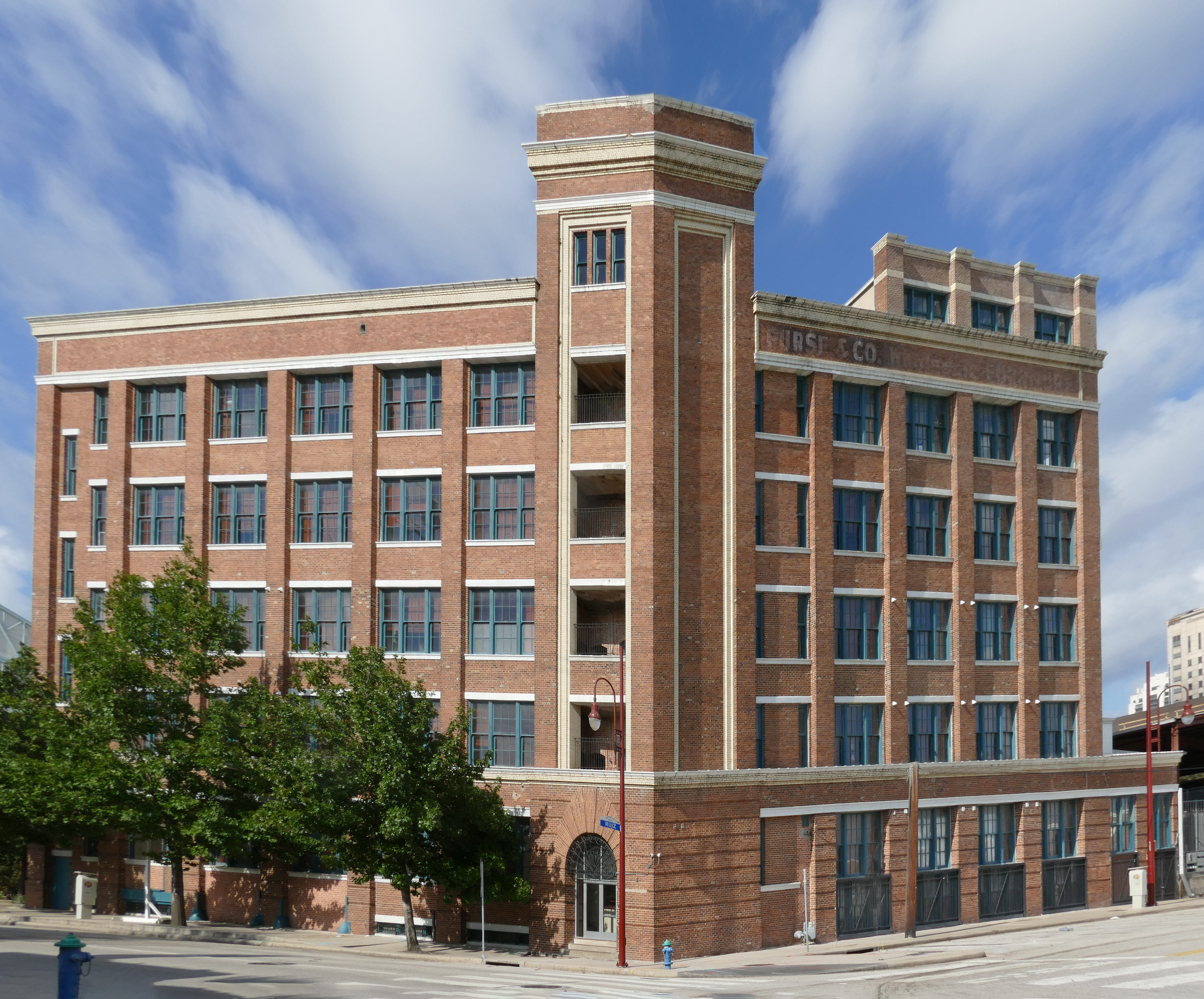
- The building's exterior in 2012

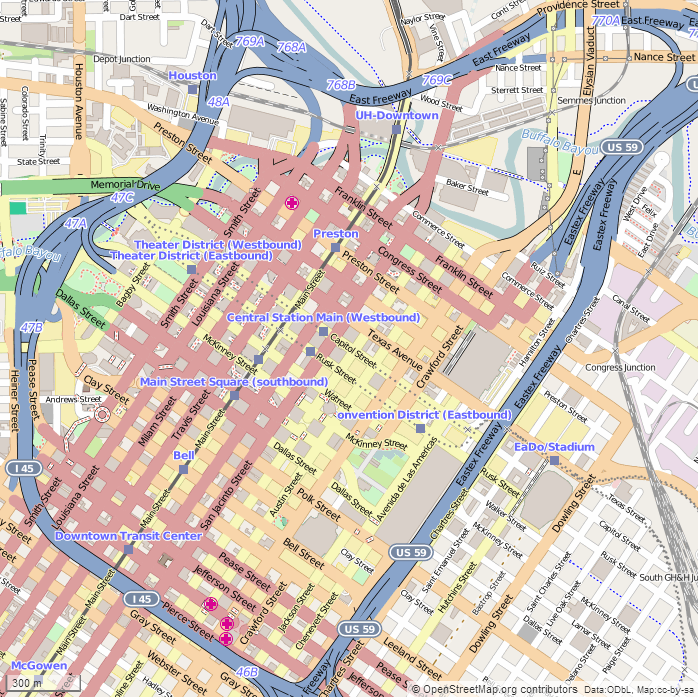
- Location within Houston Downtown Location within Texas Location within the United States
- Location: 15 N. Chenevert, Houston, Texas
- Coordinates: 29°45′36″N 95°21′8″W
- Area: less than one acre
- Built: 1910
- Architect: Albert G. Zimmerman, AIA
- Architectural style: Chicago
- NRHP reference No.: 98000141
- Added to NRHP: February 20, 1998

The National Biscuit Company Building, located at 15 North Chenevert in Houston, Texas, was built for Nabisco in 1910, and listed on the National Register of Historic Places on February 20, 1998. The structure was converted to apartments and is now known as City View Lofts.

== History ==
American snack company Nabisco was founded in 1898 and expanded rapidly during its early years. It built a new production facility in Houston, designed by in-house architect Albert G. Zimmerman. Nabisco operated within the facility until 1949, at which point it moved out and Purse & Co., a wholesale furniture distributor, took over the building.

In the 2000s, the building was redeveloped to include over 50 loft-style apartment units. It currently operates as City View Lofts.

== See also ==
- National Register of Historic Places listings in Harris County, Texas
- National Biscuit Company Building (Des Moines, Iowa)
