= Robin Haring =

Robin Haring is a German epidemiologist, author and Professor of Public Health. In 2014, Robin Haring was appointed as full professor at the European University of Applied Sciences and in 2016, as adjunct professor at Monash University, School of Public Health and Preventive Medicine.

== Academic career ==
Robin Haring studied demography at the University of Rostock (Diploma, 2006) and completed his Dissertation on “Metabolic and Endocrine Determinants of Mortality” at the University of Greifswald in 2010. He obtained his Post-Doc at Boston University in the Framingham Heart Study as a fellow of the Alfried Krupp von Bohlen und Halbach Foundation in 2010/11. His habilitation on the role of testosterone as men’s health biomarker was completed in 2013 at the University of Greifswald.

== Research ==
- Testosterone & Men’s Health
- Biomarker of healthy aging
- Digital Healthcare
- Global Health

== Books ==
- Der überforderte Patient: Gesund bleiben im Zeitalter der Hightech-Medizin. C.H.Beck, München 2014, ISBN 3406667066.
- Die Männerlüge: Wie viel Testosteron braucht der Mann? Braumüller, Wien 2015, ISBN 3991001462.
- mit Johannes Wimmer: Fragen Sie Dr. Johannes. Ihr Weg zur besten Medizin. Ullstein, Berlin 2015, ISBN 3548376207.
- mit Johannes Wimmer und Matthias Augustin: Alles über die Haut: Wie Sie gesund natürlich und schön bleiben. Ullstein, Berlin 2016, ISBN 3864930448.
- Läuft bei mir! Wie man auch ohne Erfolgsregeln entspannt Karriere macht. Redline, München 2017, ISBN 3868816755.
- mit Johannes Wimmer: Ein Schnupfen ist kein Beinbruch. Warum weniger Medizin oft gesünder ist. Ullstein, Berlin 2018, ISBN 3548377122.
- Evidenzbasierte Praxis in den Gesundheitsberufen. Springer, Heidelberg 2017, ISBN 978-3-662-55376-3.
- Gesundheit digital: Perspektiven zur Digitalisierung im Gesundheitswesen. Springer, Heidelberg 2018, ISBN 978-3-662-57610-6
- Gesundheitswissenschaften. Springer Reference, Heidelberg 2019, ISBN 978-3-662-54179-1.
- Handbook of Global Health. Major Reference Work. SpringerNature, New York 2020.
