= Herring Island (Victoria) =

Island in Victoria, Australia

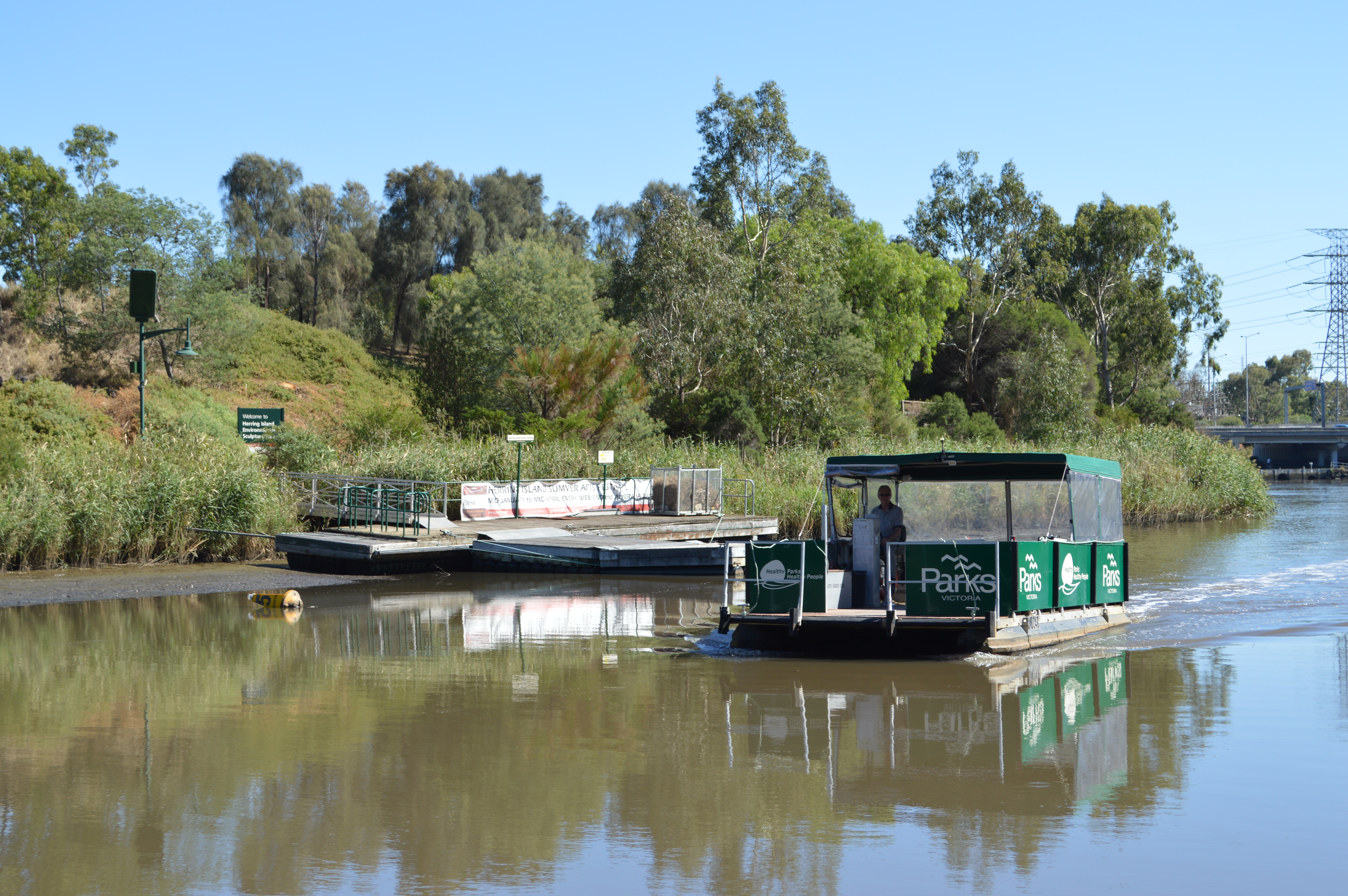
- The punt that runs between the island and Como Landing

- Location within Victoria

Geography
- Location: South Yarra, Victoria
- Coordinates: 37.8332°S 145.0031°E
- Area: 0.032 km^{2} (0.012 sq mi)

Administration
- Australia

Demographics
- Population: 0

Herring Island is a small 3.2 hectares (7.9 acres) artificial island located in Melbourne's Yarra River at South Yarra, approximately 3 kilometres (1.9 mi) from the city centre. It is the only island in the Yarra River.

Herring Island was formed in 1928 by cutting a channel through an old basalt quarry. The island was leased for many years by the scout movement, who named it after their patron, Sir Edmund Herring, the Lieutenant-Governor of Victoria and Chief Justice of the Supreme Court of Victoria. The Island contains indigenous vegetation, and provides important habitat for native fauna, particularly birds. It is currently managed by Parks Victoria and used as a sculpture park. Sculptures include works by Jill Peck, Ellen Jose, and Andy Goldsworthy.

== History ==
Herring Island is an artificial island that was formed in 1928 by cutting a new path for the Yarra River through an old basalt quarry, as part of a plan to control flooding of the river. The new island, which was initially called Como Island, was built up with silt dredged from the river. Levee banks were constructed up on the island, and trees and shrubs were planted; but they were swept away by a major flood in November 1934.

After the flood waters receded, new trees and shrubs were planted, and the levees were built up with more river silt. The island was leased by the scouts in the 1950s and 1960s. They renamed the island after their president, Sir Edmund Herring, who was also the Lieutenant-Governor of Victoria, and Chief Justice of the Supreme Court of Victoria. In 1994, Parks Victoria assumed control of the island, and turned it into a wildlife reserve and recreational park. The Friends of Herring Island have assisted Parks Victoria in re-establishing native vegetation on the island.

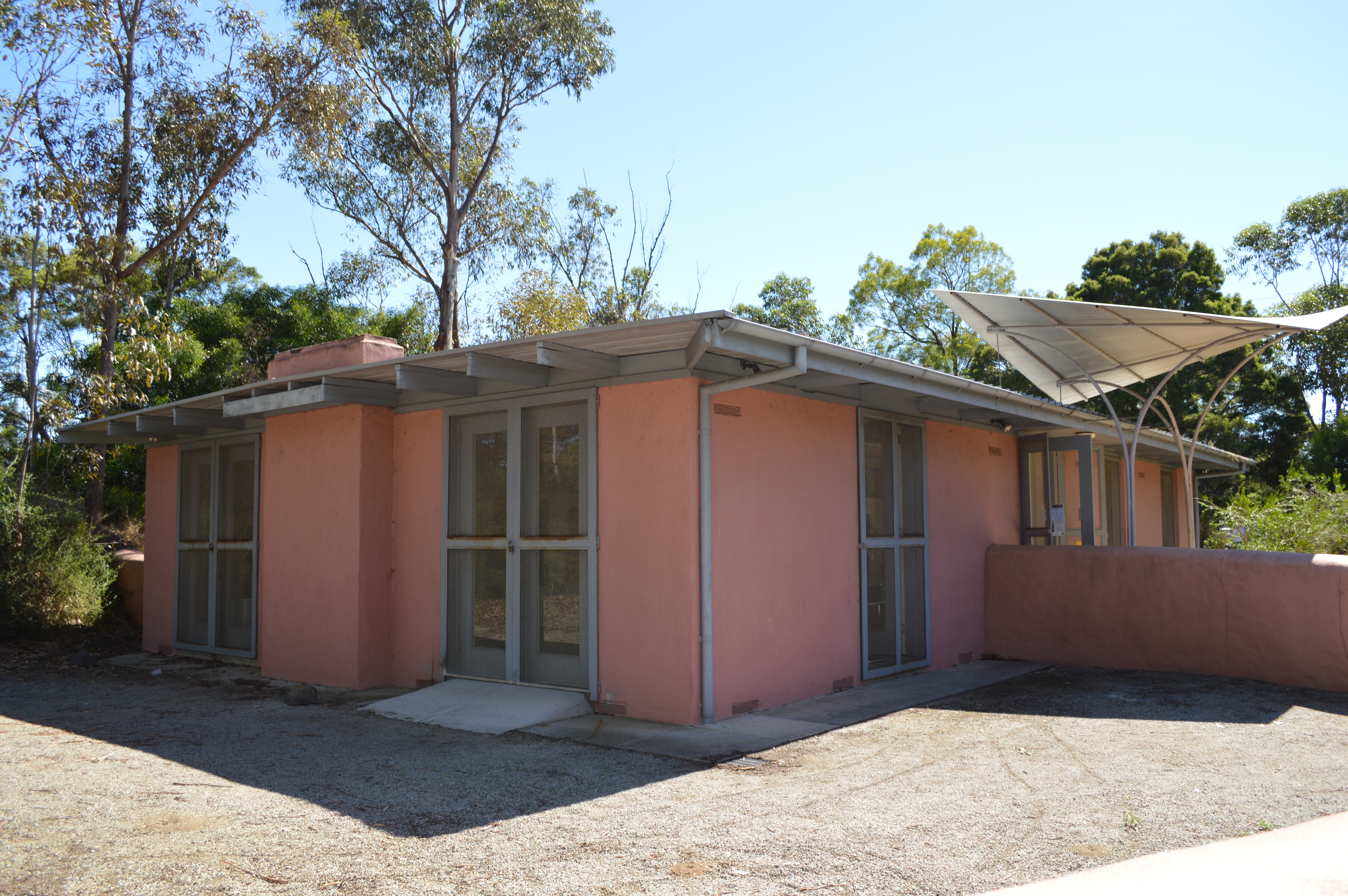
The Herring Island Gallery

Herring Island is an important environmental and recreational asset in Melbourne's inner suburbs, and forms an important focus for the linear parkland proposed for the lower reaches of the Yarra River. The Island contains indigenous vegetation, and provides important habitat for native fauna, particularly birds and insect eating bats. Grey headed flying foxes (megabats) visit at night in search of flowering and fruiting native trees. Such areas are rare in the inner suburbs, and are a valuable ecological resource. Herring Island is also an important recreational resource which provides opportunities for nature study, passive recreation and adventure play. A former scout building was renovated to become the Herring Island Gallery in 1997.

There is also a small permanent exhibition installed by Friends of Herring Island in consultation with Wurundjeri elder Joy Wandin Murphy which consists of historical drawings, paintings and photographs by aboriginal and European artists which depict the collision of indigenous Australian and colonial European worlds in the 19th century.

Herring Island is little known to the people of Melbourne despite its prominent position in the Yarra River. For years, the Island had been used as a depository for silt dredged from the Yarra River and has experienced periods of neglect. This has left a legacy of land degradation, particularly soil salting, tree dieback, and weed invasion.

Access to the island is from a punt service that leaves from Como landing. The punt service operates on Saturdays, Sundays and some public holidays from January through April. Visitors can also travel down the Yarra River in their own boat, but swimming in the Yarra is prohibited.

== Flora and fauna ==
Plants on the island include Allocasuarina verticilata (drooping sheoke) river red gums, silver wattle, acacia paradoxa (hedge wattle)manna gum, southern mahogany and wallaby and spear grass. Two species of native saltbush were reintroduced to the island in the late 1990s and have become the dominant understorey in much of the island. Saltbush is a habitat for insects and small birds and use useful for out competeing and suppressing exotic weeds.The island is inhabited by several species of birds, including superb fairy wrens, honeyeaters, spotted pardelotes, willie wagtails, grey fantails, red rumped parrots, crested pigeons, cormorants, kookaburras, magpies, wattlebirds and white-faced herons. Water birds such as Pacific black ducks, black Swan, dusky moorhen and maned ducks can be found in the surrounding waters. The island is also home to some species of possums and reptiles, including snakes and lizards. Micro-bats and grey-headed flying foxes (pteropus poliocephalus) visit at night in search of food. There have been very rare visits to the island by solitary swamp wallabies.

== Sculpture park ==
Herring Island Environmental Sculpture Park
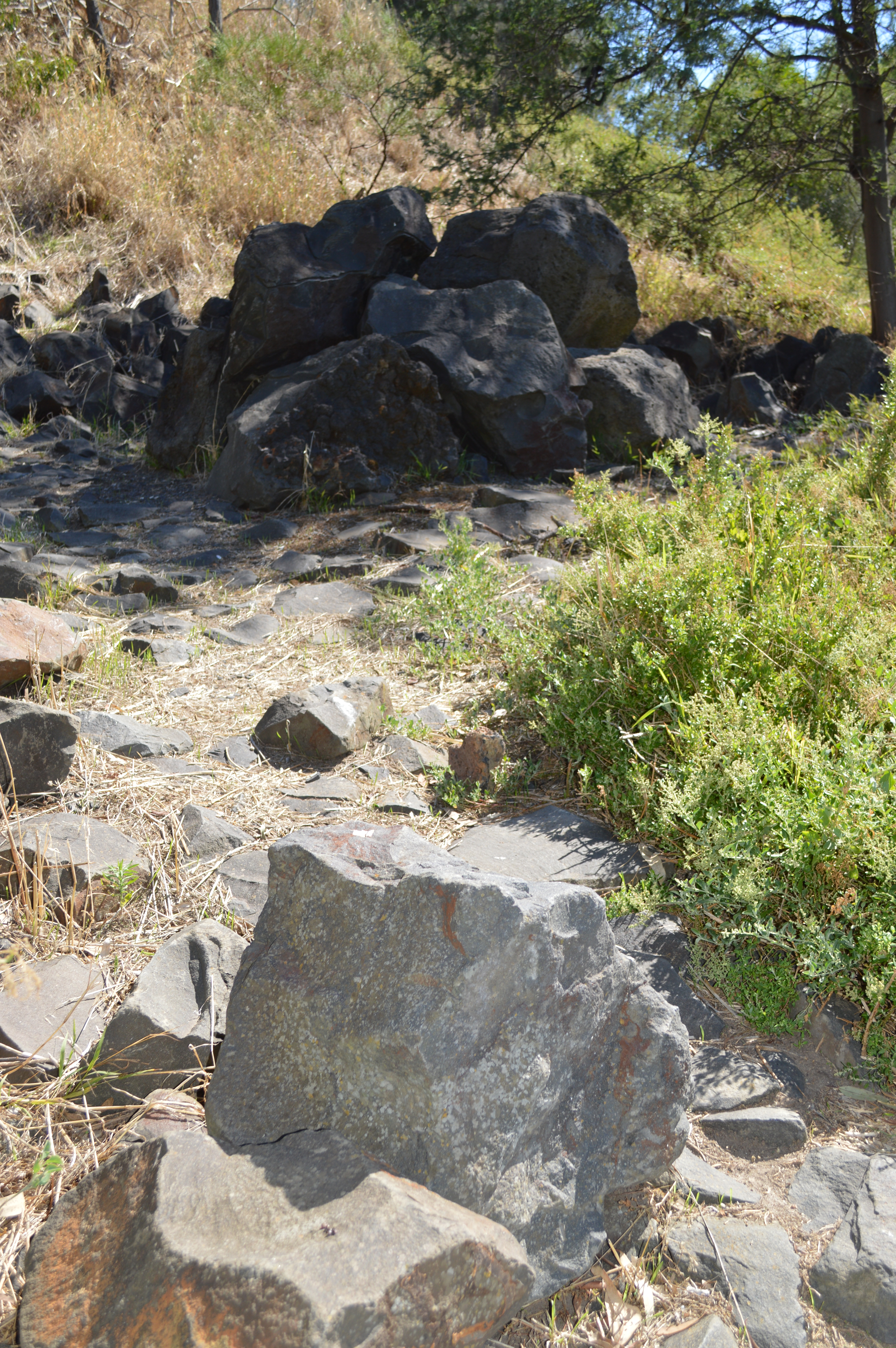
Audience (1997) by Julie Collins

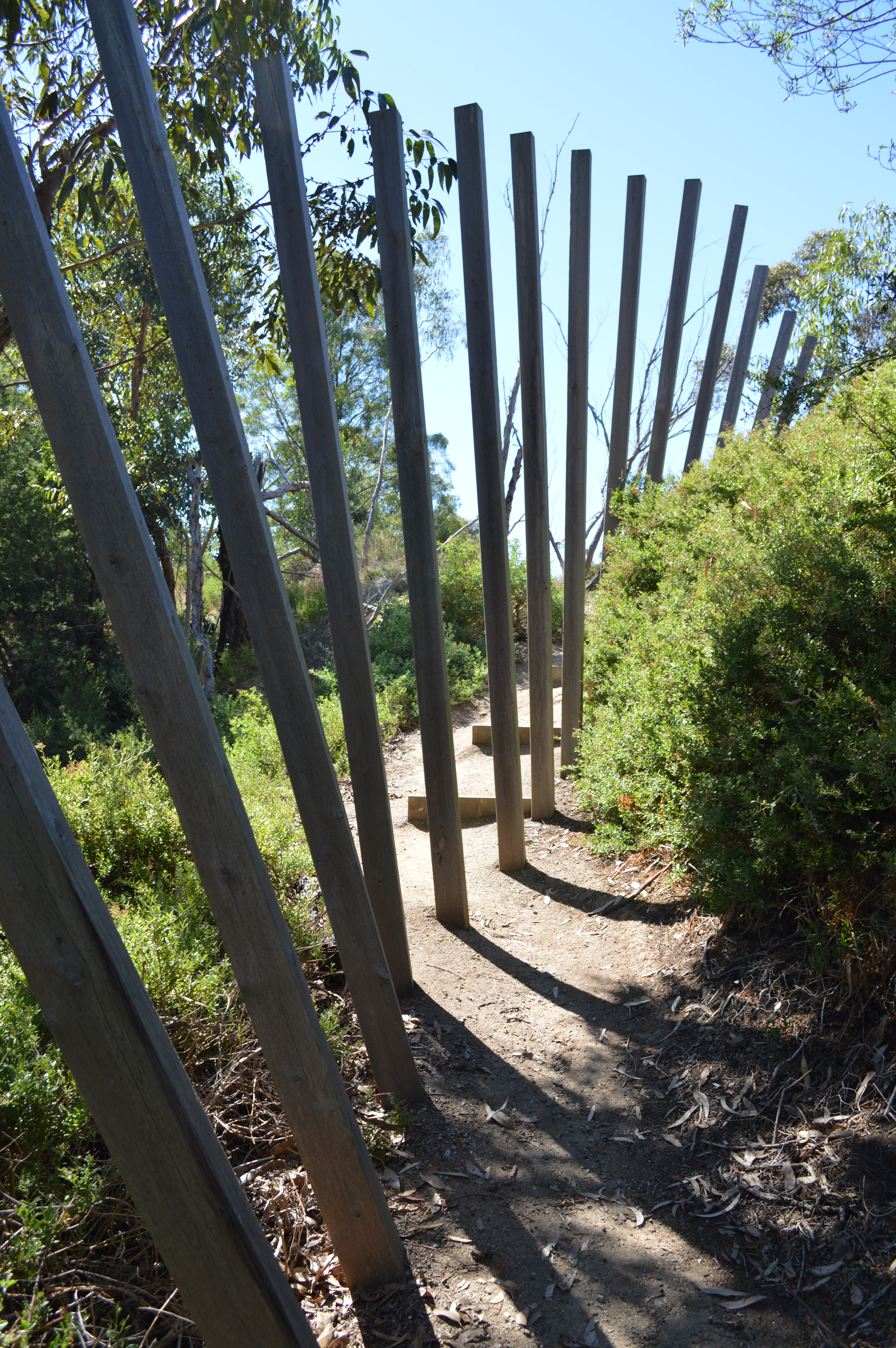
Falling Fence (2001) by John Gollings and Samantha Slicer

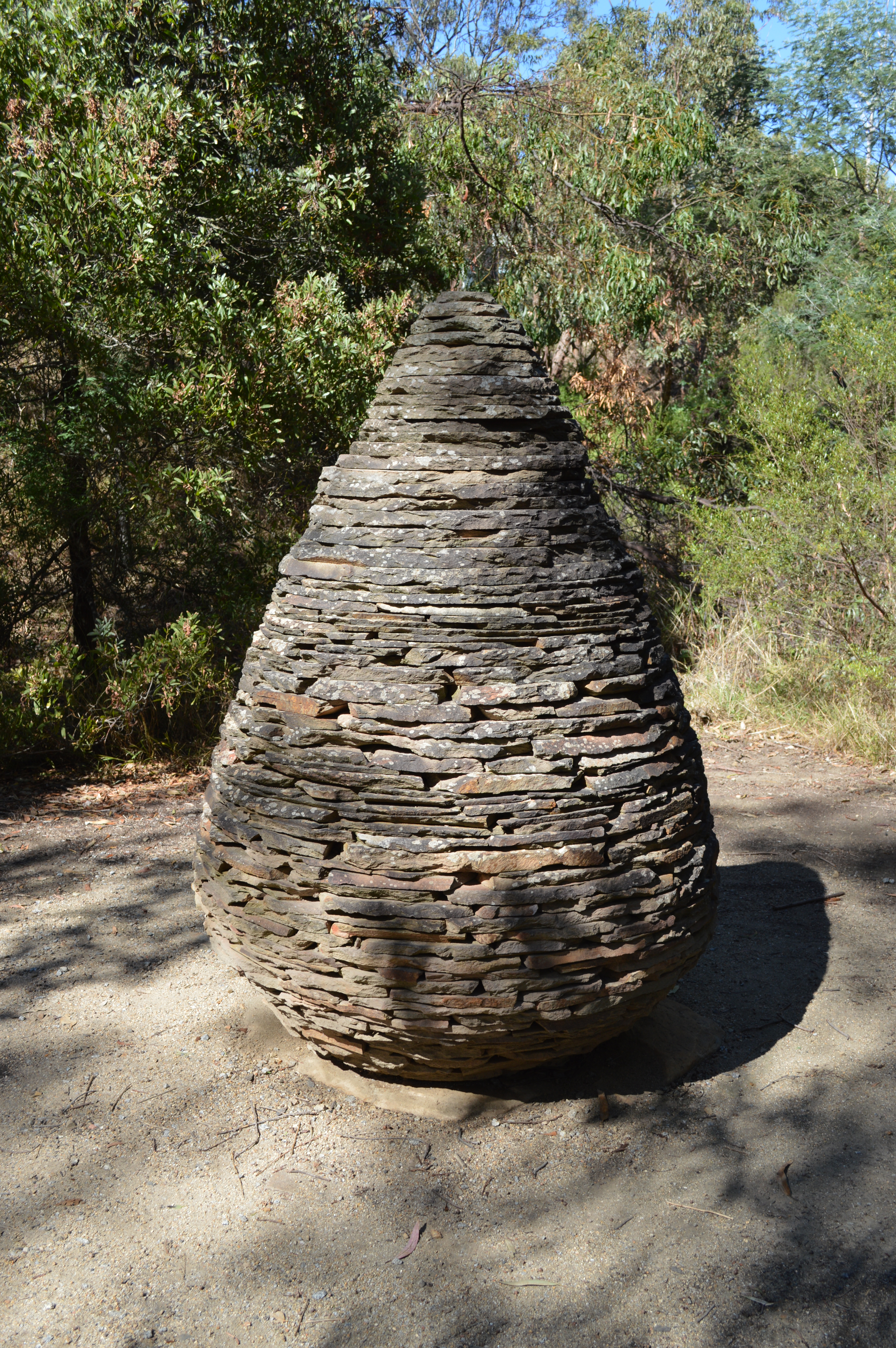
Cairn (1997) by Andy Goldsworthy

=== Audience ===
Audience by Julie Collins is made from bluestone taken from the Domain Tunnel under the Yarra River.

=== Falling Fence ===
Falling Fence is a sculpture by Melbourne photographer John Gollings and his assistant Samantha Slicer. It was officially launched in 2001. It is made of cypress pine, and is intended to blend in with its surroundings over time.

=== Cairn ===
Cairn by British sculptor Andy Goldsworthy is made from Castlemaine slate, and is located in the only valley on the island.

Herring Island Environmental Sculpture Park
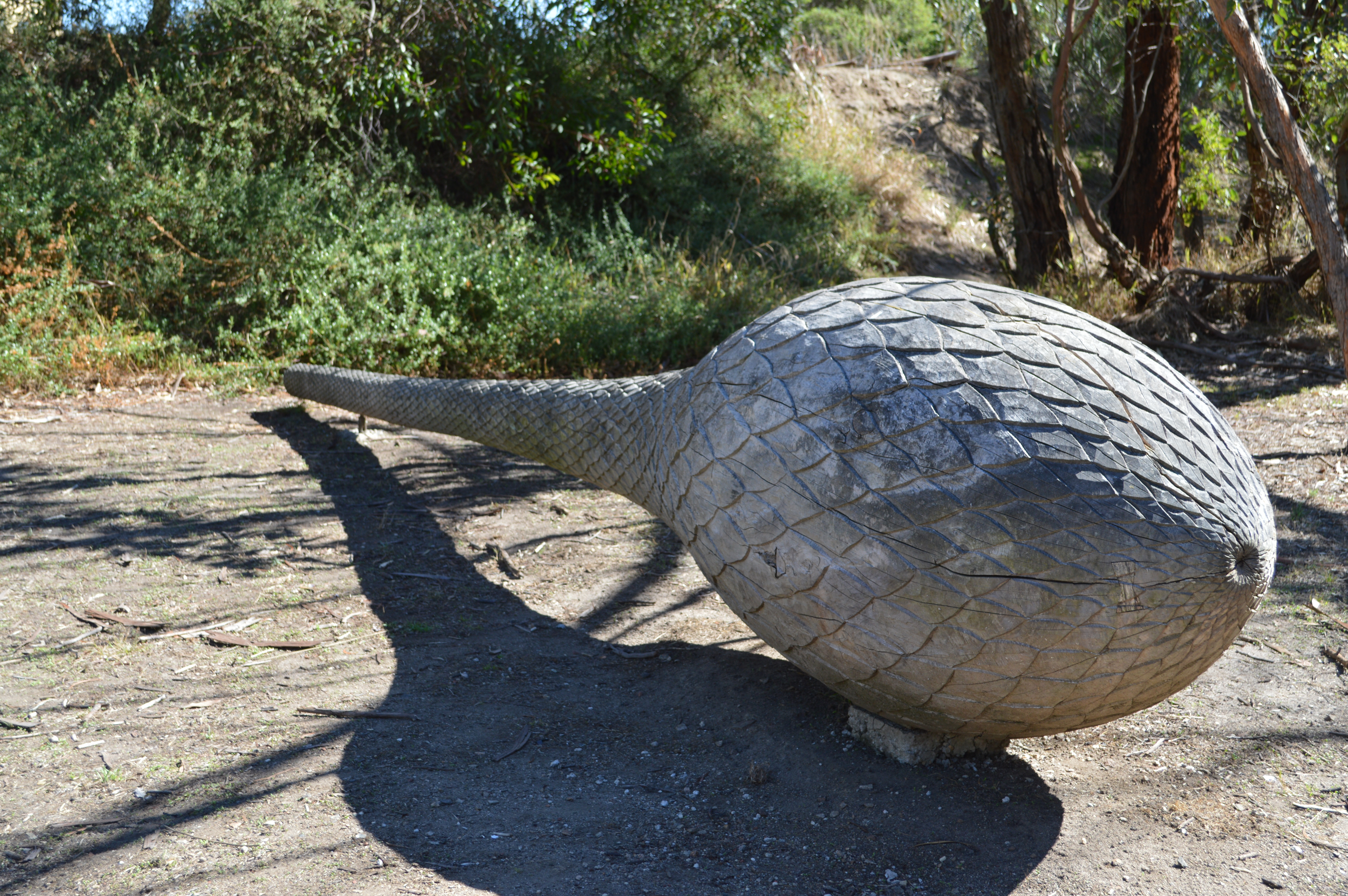
Scaled Stem (1999) by Robert Bridgewater

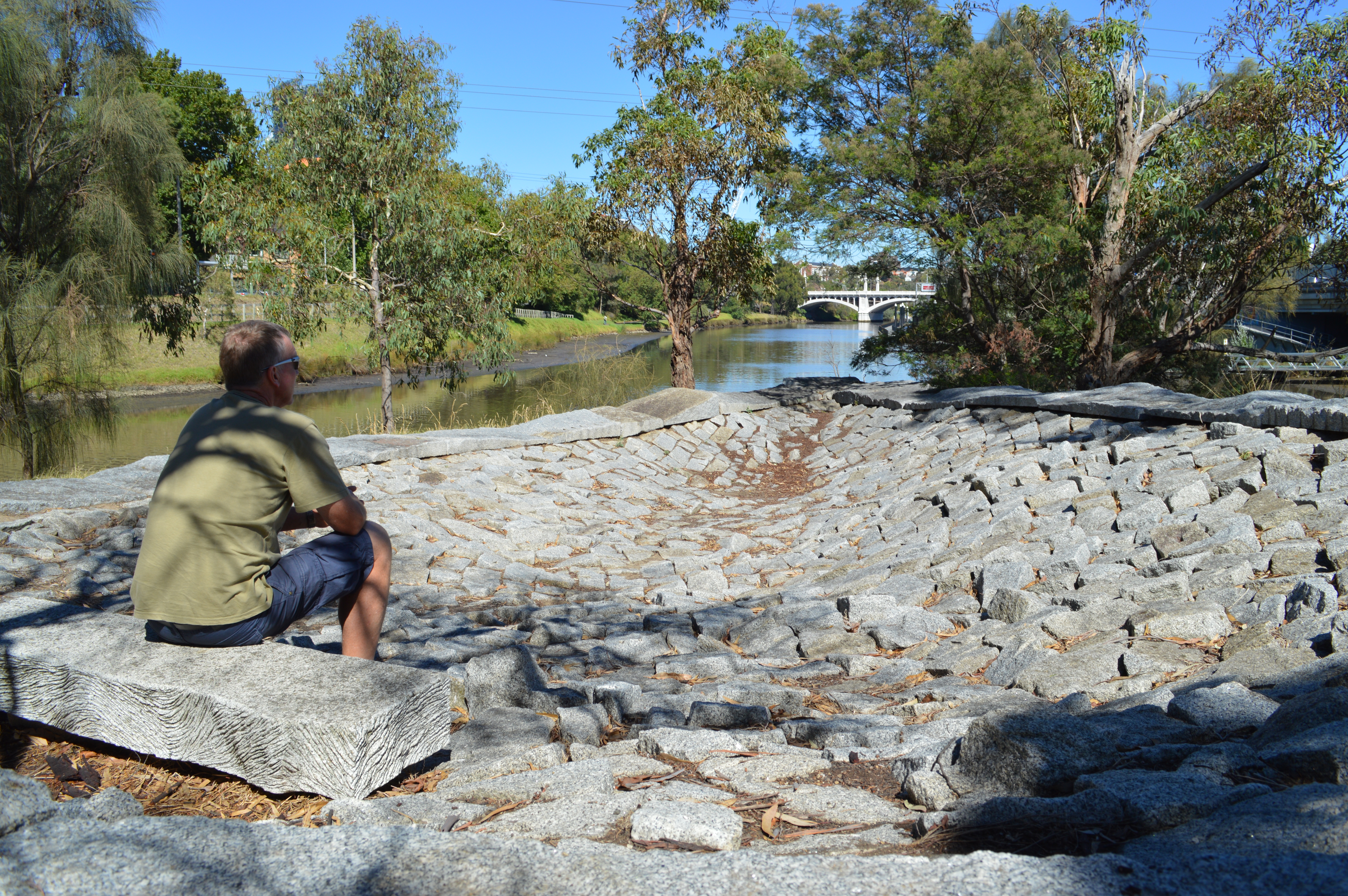
Steerage (1997) by Jill Peck

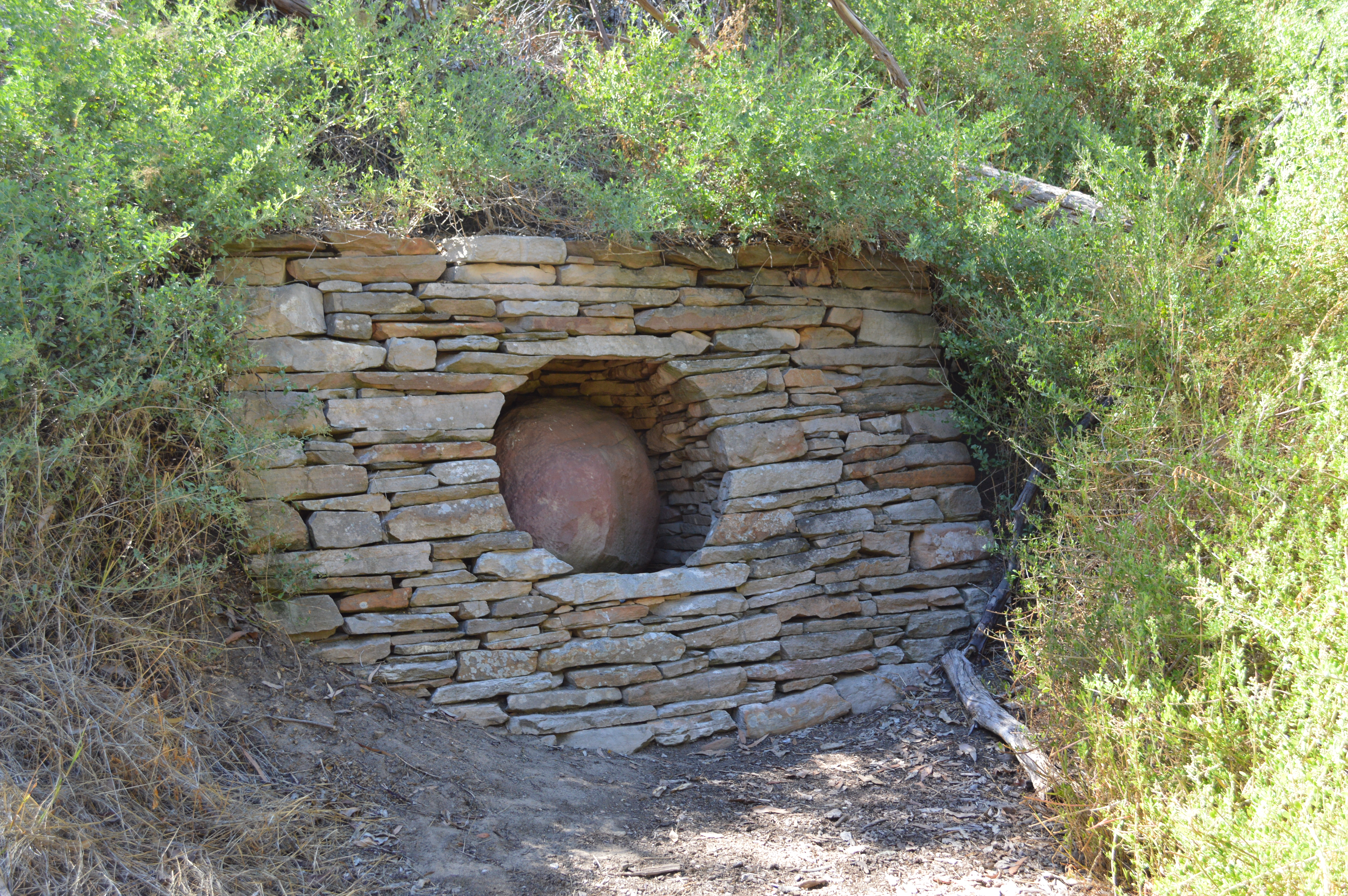
Stone House (1997) by Andy Goldsworthy

=== Scaled Stem ===
Scaled Stem by Melbourne sculptor Robert Bridgewater is carved from Cupressus macrocarpa. According to Bridgewater, it "is part of a continuing line of enquiry concerned largely with relationships between form, pattern, craft and material and the poetic associations that can be evoked via these relationships".

=== Steerage ===
Steerage by Canberra sculptor is made of Harcourt granite in the shape of a boat, which points toward the city.

=== Stone House ===
Stone House, the other sculpture on the island by Andy Goldsworthy, is make from Dunkeld sandstone.

Herring Island Environmental Sculpture Park
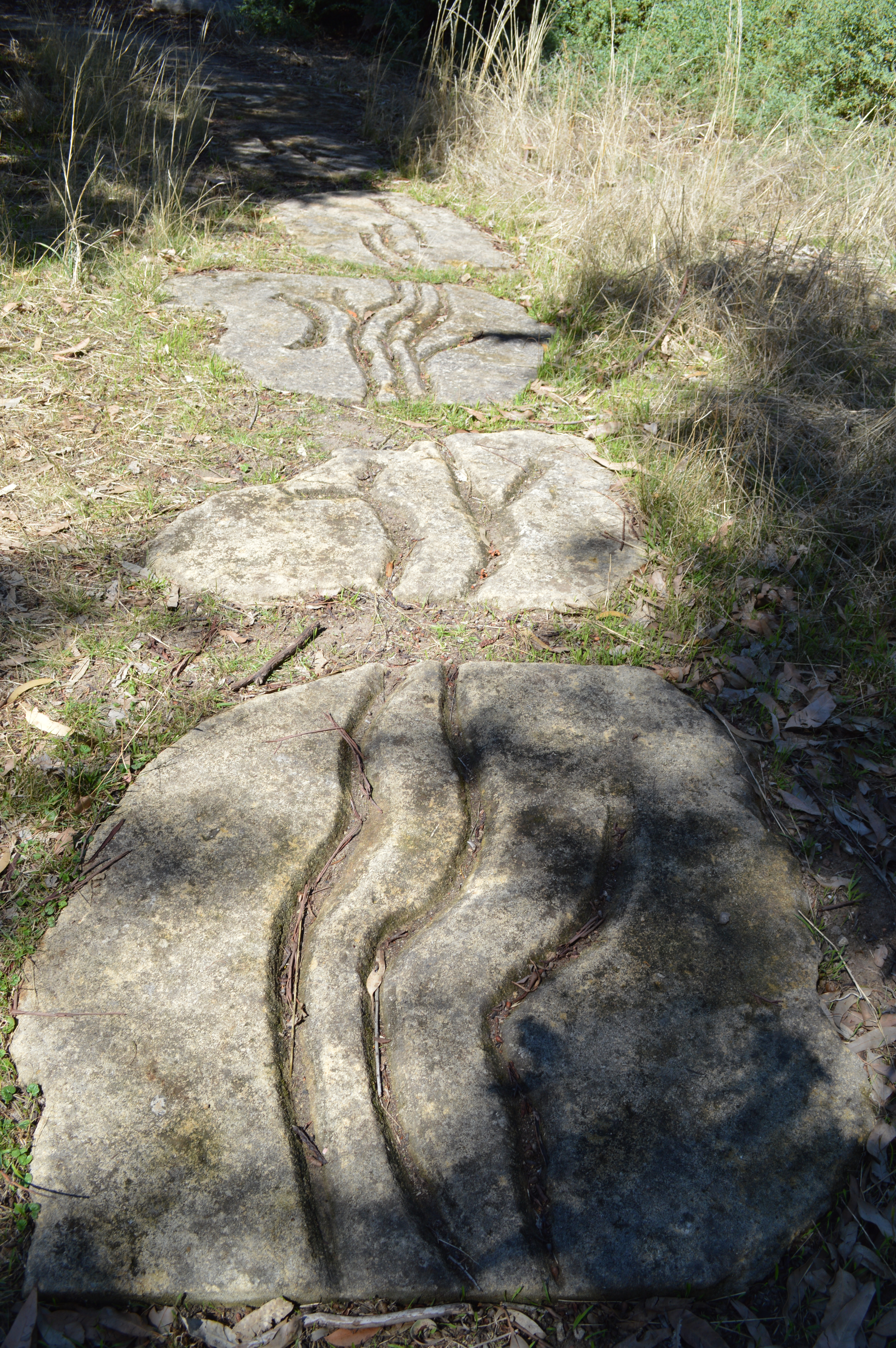
A Hill, a River, Two Rocks and a Presence (1997) by John Davis

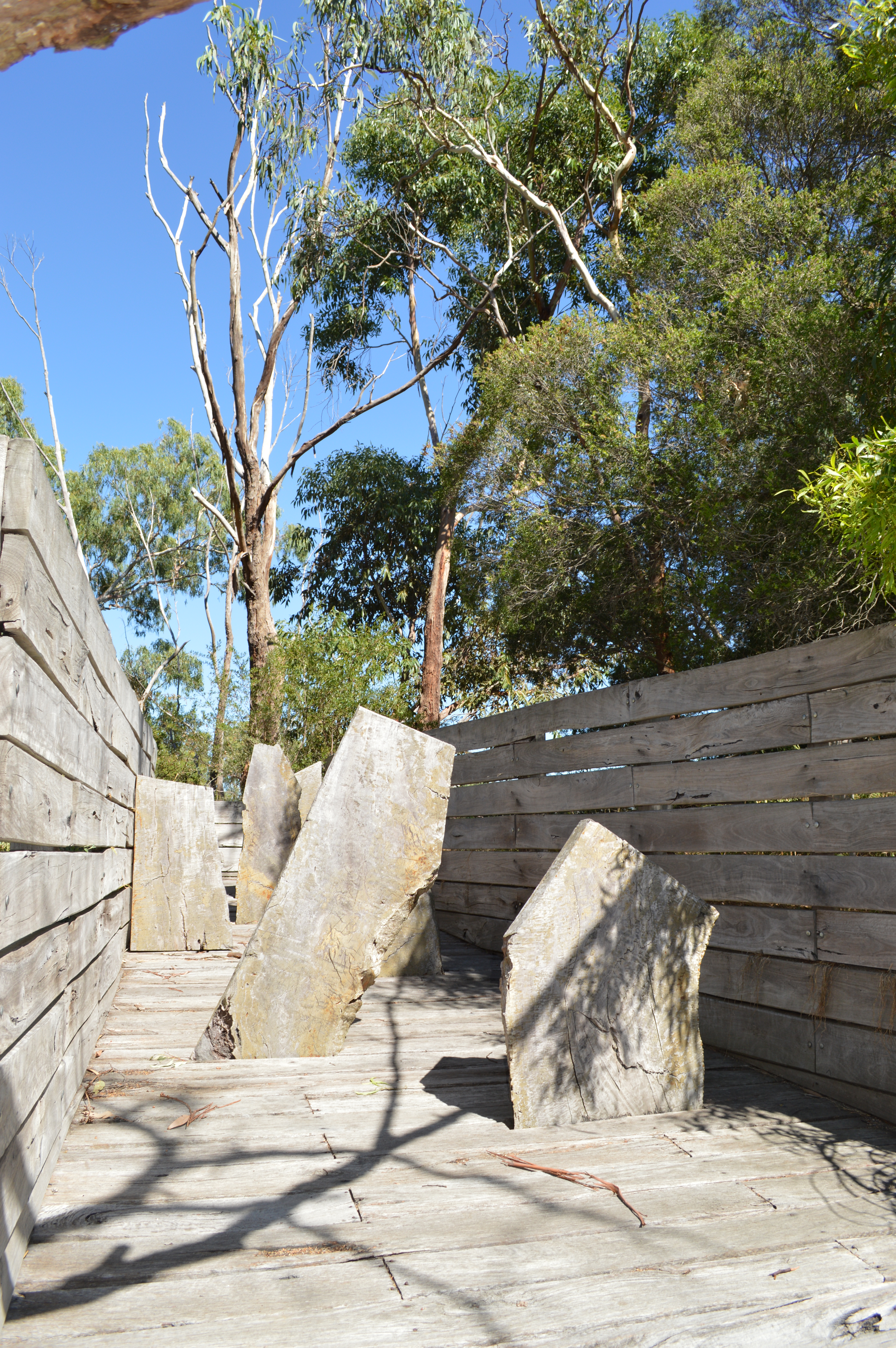
Ramp (1998) by Robert Jacks

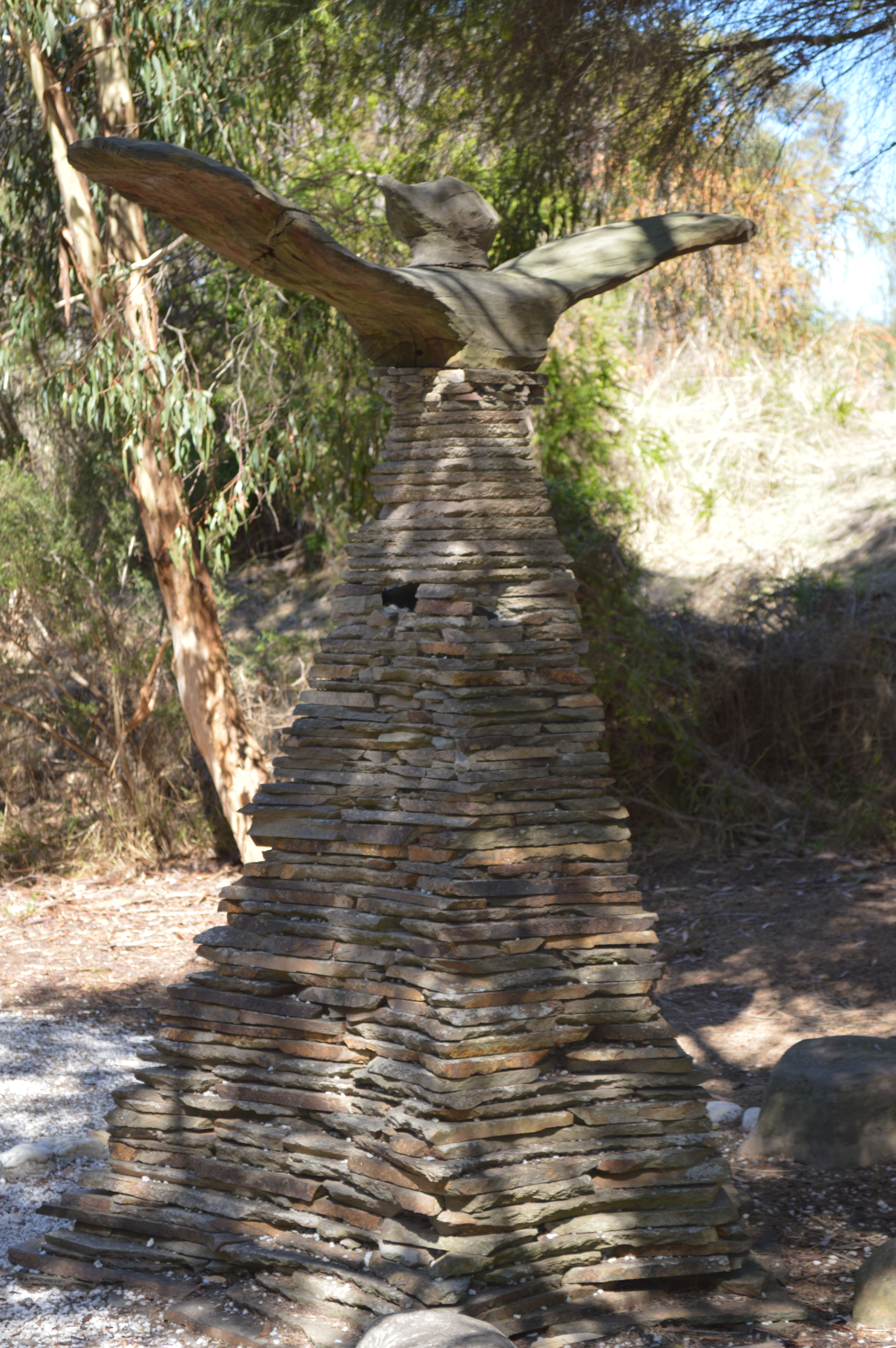
Tanderrum (1997) by Ellen Jose

=== A Hill, a River, Two Rocks and a Presence ===
A Hill, a River, Two Rocks and a Presence is a work in timber and stone by Melbourne sculptor John Davis. It was originally made from tree branches, but these became damaged and were replaced by limestone.

=== Ramp ===
Ramp is a red gum sculpture by Victorian sculptor Robert Jacks.

=== Tanderrum ===
Tanderum by Torres Strait Islander artist Ellen Jose is constructed of Mt William greenstone, Castlemaine slate and redbox. It represents the spirit of the Kulin people, the traditional owners of the land. This artwork was renovated in 2008.
