= Red Hairing =

- Arrested Development episode
- Episode no.: Season 4 Episode 8
- Directed by: Troy Miller; Mitchell Hurwitz
- Written by: Caroline Williams; Richard Rosenstock
- Cinematography by: Peter Lyons Collister; Chuck Ozeas
- Editing by: Kabir Akhtar; A.J. Dickerson
- Production code: 4AJD06
- Original air date: May 26, 2013
- Running time: 37 minutes

Guest appearances
- Chris Diamantopoulos as Marky Bark; Terry Crews as Herbert Love; Kristen Wiig as Young Lucille Bluth; Isla Fisher as Rebel Alley; Christine Taylor as Sally Sitwell; Liza Minnelli as Lucille Austero; Justin Lee as Annyong Bluth

Episode chronology
← Previous "Colony Collapse"	Next → "Smashed"
- Arrested Development season 4

"Red Hairing" is the eighth episode of the fourth season of the American television satirical sitcom Arrested Development. It is the 61st overall episode of the series, and was written by supervising producer Caroline Williams and co-executive producer Richard Rosenstock, and directed by executive producer Troy Miller and series creator Mitchell Hurwitz. It originally released on May 26, 2013, with the rest of the season, and was distributed by Netflix.

The series, narrated by Ron Howard, follows the Bluths, a formerly wealthy, dysfunctional family, who made their money from property development. The Bluth family consists of Michael, his adopted sister Lindsay, his older brother Gob, his younger brother Buster, their mother Lucille and father George Sr., as well as Michael's son George Michael, and Lindsay and her husband Tobias' daughter Maeby. Each episode of the season follows a different character, with this episode focusing on Lindsay and her relationships with Marky Bark and Herbert Love.

== Plot ==
Lindsay (Portia de Rossi) stays at Marky Bark's (Chris Diamantopoulos) ostrich farm, which she hates. Lindsay finds out that she missed Lucille's (Jessica Walter) trial, which had resulted in Lucille being "sent away", so she, Marky, and Marky's ostrich, Cindy, move into the penthouse. A year later, Marky starts building a glitter bomb intended for Herbert Love (Terry Crews) and ropes Lindsay into the plan. Meanwhile, Lindsay visits Lucille Austero (Liza Minnelli), who gives her a ginger wig after Lindsay helps Lucille with her political campaign. Lindsay and Mark then have a fight about Marky's plan, and Marky leaves in anger. Lindsay finds a check addressed to Maeby (Alia Shawkat) which she assumes is from Lucille for Maeby to get a facelift. Lindsay visits Lucille to confront her about the check, where Lucille likens Lindsay to herself. Lindsay, wanting to prove she isn't like her mother, decides to join Marky's plan against Herbert Love. Lindsay and Marky arrive in Beverly Hills, where they attend an awards ceremony and political fundraiser. Lindsay, donning her wig, bumps into George Sr. (Jeffrey Tambor) and reluctantly gives him the check. (Note: As seen in "Double Crossers.")

Lindsay then runs into Maeby, who assumes Lindsay is supporting Herbert. Lindsay tells Maeby her glitter bomb plan, and Maeby respects Lindsay. Herbert starts flirting with Lindsay, who flirts back as she doesn't recognize him. Lindsay tells Herbert that her name is Cindy Featherbottom and gives him her phone number. She loses track of time and forgets to press the button to release Marky with the glitter bomb, and he is arrested. Maeby tells Lindsay that she has been flirting with Herbert Love and calls her a whore. Lindsay returns to the penthouse, where she finds an eviction notice. Lindsay visits Marky in prison, where he explains he couldn't escape from the glitter bomb because someone had locked him inside where he was hiding. (Note: It is revealed that Gob (Will Arnett) had locked Marky inside, thinking he was actually locking Tony Wonder (Ben Stiller), as seen in the previous episode "Colony Collapse.") Marky asks Lindsay to use the check and bail her out, but she explains that she doesn't have it anymore. Lindsay visits Maeby at a model home. Maeby, assuming Lindsay was flirting with Herbert to get Marky out of jail, arranges for him and Lindsay to meet for dinner at the Balboa Club.

Lindsay runs into Michael (Jason Bateman) at the Balboa Club. Michael asks Lindsay to get Herbert against the proposed border between America and Mexico. In a flashback, it is revealed that Michael had made a deal with George Sr. (Note: As seen in "Double Crossers.") in which Michael agreed to get Herbert Love against the border in exchange for George Sr. giving Michael his membership to the Balboa Club. Lindsay agrees to help Michael on the condition that Michael get Marky out of jail. Michael asks Lindsay for her film rights in return, and the two agree on their terms. Due to the club being members only, Michael cannot enter. Wanting to save face, Michael calls George Michael (Michael Cera), who he was planning on meeting, and tells him he is stuck in traffic. George Michael then calls back, saying he too is stuck in traffic. After Lindsay and Herbert have sex, he hires her to work for his campaign. Lindsay and Herbert go out to dinner, where Lindsay sees Michael and Rebel Alley (Isla Fisher), and the four have dinner together. Michael gets a call from George Michael, who asks if he wants to have dinner with him, but Michael declines. Lindsay runs into Marky, who explains he is planning to make a real bomb to target Herbert on Cinco de Cuatro. At Cinco de Cuatro, Herbert breaks up with Lindsay. Lindsay then runs into Lucille and throws her wig away. (Note: In the episode "Double Crossers," George Sr. picks up the wig and wears it.) Lindsay tells Lucille Austero that she is ready to become her campaign manager, but the role has already been filled by Sally Sitwell (Christine Taylor). Sally tells Lindsay that they have photos of her and Herbert having sex, and Lindsay accidentally incites a riot by revealing Herbert's plans to build the wall. After having her necklace stolen, Lindsay changes her mind and endorses the wall.

=== On the next Arrested Development... ===
Herbert Love is discovered in a coma, and Lindsay starts running in his place. Annyong (Justin Lee) buys a tomato juice at the Balboa Club, which costs him $700 of accumulated bills.

== Production ==
"Red Hairing" was directed by executive producer Troy Miller and series creator Mitchell Hurwitz, and written by supervising producer Caroline Williams and co-executive producer Richard Rosenstock. It was Miller and Hurwitz's eighth directing credits, Williams' second writing credit and Rosenstock's tenth writing credit.

The season's format is different compared to previous seasons, as each of the 15 episodes focus on one individual character, with every episode happening at the same time within the show's universe, showing the character's activities since the conclusion of the third season. "Red Hairing" was the sixth episode of the season to be filmed, and the second of two focusing on Lindsay.

== Reception ==
Eric Goldman of IGN gave the episode a 7.2 out of ten, calling it "an improvement over the season’s first Lindsay episode, though it still exhibited a lot of Season 4’s weaker aspects." Goldman criticized the runtime, calling it "too much of a good thing." The Guardian's Hadley Freeman praised the episode, stating "the show is finding its rhythm now that there isn't quite so much exposition and the characters are coming more and more together." Noel Murray and Erik Adams of The A.V. Club gave the episode a B grade. Adams criticized on Michael's appearance in the episode, calling it "a distracting presence". Chris Longo of Den of Geek gave the episode three stars out of five. In 2019, Brian Tallerico from Vulture ranked the episode 76th out of the whole series, stating the episode suffers from "the mid-season sag".
