= Salute Your Shorts =

American television sitcom (1991–1992)

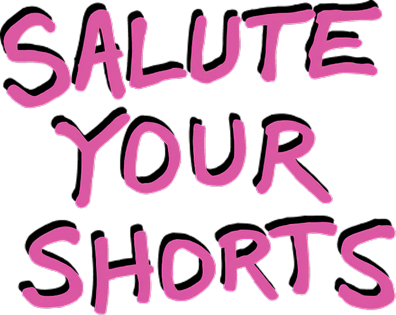
- Genre: Teen sitcom
- Created by: Steve Slavkin
- Based on: Salute Your Shorts: Life at Summer Camp by Steve Slavkin and Thomas Hill
- Starring: Kirk Baily; Megan Berwick; Michael Bower; Danny Cooksey; Venus DeMilo; Tim Eyster; Heidi Lucas; Erik MacArthur; Blake Soper
- Narrated by: Steve Slavkin
- Theme music composer: Ed Alton
- Country of origin: United States
- Original language: English
- No. of seasons: 2
- No. of episodes: 26 (list of episodes)

Production
- Executive producers: Tim Clawson; Matt Loze; Steve Slavkin
- Production locations: Los Angeles, California
- Camera setup: Single-camera
- Running time: 22–24 minutes (per episode)
- Production company: Propaganda Films

Original release
- Network: Nickelodeon
- Release: July 4, 1991 – September 12, 1992

Salute Your Shorts is an American television sitcom created by Steve Slavkin and produced by Propaganda Films, which aired on Nickelodeon from July 4, 1991, to September 12, 1992.

Focused around the life of young campers at the fictional Camp Anawanna, the show was based on Slavkin's 1986 book Salute Your Shorts: Life at Summer Camp that he co-wrote with Thomas Hill.

Despite its short run and limited availability on home media, the show received positive reviews and was consistently one of the highest-rated cable programs.

== Premise ==
The series is set at the fictional summer camp, Camp Anawanna (a play on the exclamation "I don't want to"). It focuses on teenage campers, their strict and bossy counselor, and the various capers and jocularities they engage in.

The first season focused on the power struggle between upstanding newcomer Michael Stein (Erik MacArthur) and camp bully Bobby Budnick (Danny Cooksey). Ronnie Pinsky (Blake Soper) replaced Michael in the second season, countering Budnick as a suave, preppie ladies-man. Other campers included Budnick's accomplice Eddie "Donkey Lips" Gelfand (Michael Bower), nerdy Sponge Harris (Tim Eyster), stuck-up rich girl Dina Alexander (Heidi Lucas), tomboy Telly Radford (Venus DeMilo Thomas), and nature-loving Z.Z. Ziff (Megan Berwick).

Kevin "Ug" Lee (Kirk Baily), the dim-witted camp counselor, served as antagonist to all the children. Dr. Kahn (Steve Slavkin), the unseen camp director, was heard providing announcements over the public address system. Mona Tibbs (Christine Cavanaugh) made recurring appearances as Ug's love interest.

The title of the show comes from a common prank campers play on each other: a group of children steal a boy's boxer shorts and raise them up a flagpole. Hence, when people see them waving like a flag, other children salute them as part of the prank. In the first episode of the series, Michael falls victim to this prank.

== Episodes ==
Season	Episodes	Originally released	
Season	Episodes	First released	Last released
Pilot	1	October 6, 1990	
1	13	July 4, 1991	October 19, 1991
2	13	June 26, 1992	September 12, 1992

== Production ==
We wanted to bring film techniques to kids' television. It was a single-camera show that was shot on video and put through the film-look process to give kids mini-movies about summer camp that were scored from beginning to end. We gave them a whole new look they'd never had before.

— Steve Slavkin

Steve Slavkin was commissioned by Nickelodeon to write a television pilot based on his 1986 book Salute Your Shorts: Life at Summer Camp that he co-wrote with Thomas Hill.

Nickelodeon was under pressure in 1990 to create original programming that could compete with The Disney Afternoon, while also shedding its image as "the game show network". Double Dare had been a major success for the network since its premiere in 1986, but the channel lacked in-house narrative programming and in-house animation. Camp Candy launched on NBC in 1989 and showed there was an audience for children's programming about summer camp.

Randall Miller directed the pilot episode of the series, which was filmed at Griffith Park Boys Camp in March 1990. It starred Ian Giatti as Michael, Danny Cooksey as Budnick, Kirk Baily as Ug, Michael Bower as Donkey Lips, David Tom as Sponge, Teri Johnston as Dina, Alexandra Kurhan as Telly, and Kelley Parker as Z.Z. Miller had previously directed Bower, Johnston and Parker in his short-film Marilyn Hotchkiss' Ballroom Dancing and Charm School. The pilot aired Saturday, October 6, 1990, at 5:30pm EST on Nickelodeon as the television special Salute Your Shorts.

The show was re-cast after being picked up to series in February 1991, as many of the young actors had outgrown their roles since the pilot was filmed. The only cast members retained from the pilot were Cooksey, Baily and Bower.

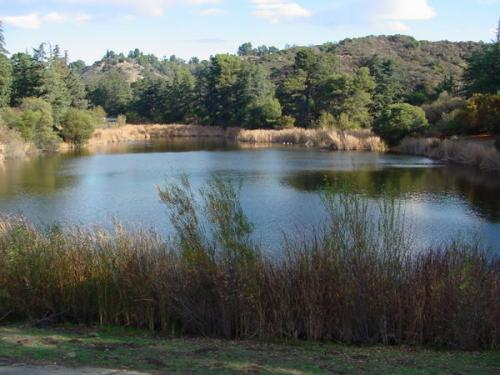
Franklin Canyon Park

Filming of the first season's initial order of 6 episodes took place in April and May 1991. The series was allotted $180,000 per episode, which was considered low-budget. Interiors for the show were filmed inside a soundstage on Lankershim Boulevard in Sun Valley. Exteriors were filmed at Franklin Canyon Park and the Griffith Park Boys Camp. Some exterior shots of the bunks were done using three-foot high miniatures.

The show's music was composed by Ed Alton, who had previously composed the music for Head of the Class. The opening theme song was a mock Camp Anawanna alma mater composed by Alton, with lyrics by Slavkin. The cast sang the opening theme live over a pre-recorded track of Alton playing the piano.

The first season premiered with a special primetime broadcast on Thursday, July 4, 1991 (Independence Day), with new episodes airing Saturdays at 5:30pm EST thereafter. Filming for the remaining 7 episodes of the first season took place in August and September 1991. The series was renewed for a 13-episode second season in October 1991.

Cast members were flown to Orlando for promotional appearances at Nickelodeon Studios in December 1991. Cooksey and Bower defeated Heidi Lucas and Megan Berwick on an episode of Nick Arcade. Baily also joined Berwick, Bower, Cooksey and Lucas for an outdoor autograph signing. Cooksey has said this trip is when he realized how popular the series had become, with fans singing the show's theme song upon seeing the cast.

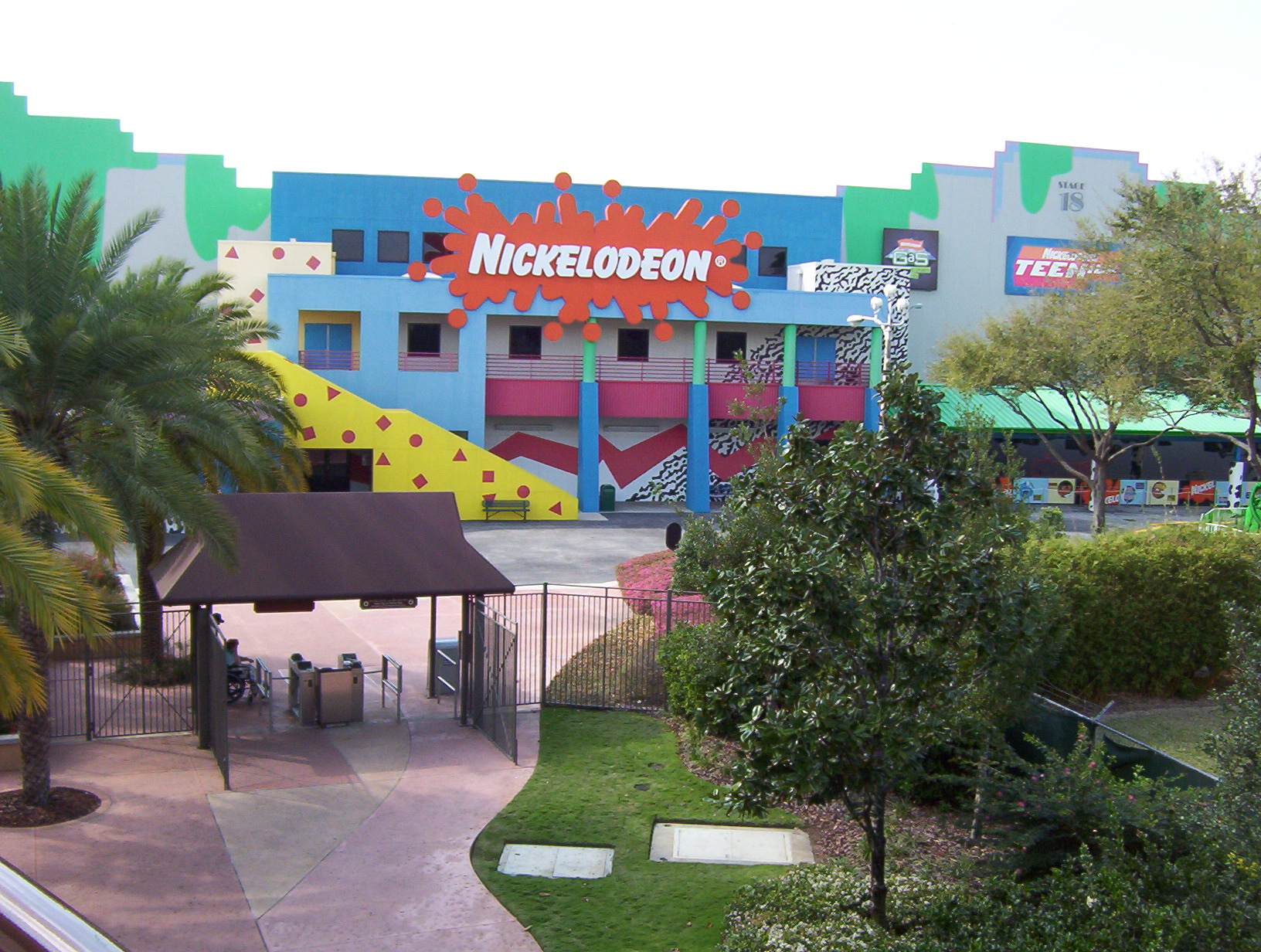
Nickelodeon Studios

Erik MacArthur left the show just before second season filming began in April 1992, so his character of Michael was written out and replaced with Blake Soper as Pinsky. Soper was scheduled to play Scotty Rex in the episode "Telly and the Tennis Match" before producers asked him to join the series full-time.

Slavkin walked out of filming to protest Nickelodeon denying the cast raises for potential third and fourth seasons. Nickelodeon was infamous for underpaying its child actors, with Ryan Reynolds admitting the network only paid him $150 per episode while starring in Fifteen. Slavkin never returned, and the final two weeks of second season filming were completed without him.

The second season premiered with a special primetime broadcast on Friday, June 26, 1992, with new episodes airing Saturdays at 6:00pm EST thereafter.

The series was not renewed for a third season after the network wanted production moved to Nickelodeon Studios, but most of the cast was unwilling to relocate from Los Angeles to Orlando. Nickelodeon was under pressure by parent company Viacom to reduce its budget so that MTV could fund production of Beavis and Butt-Head.

== Reception ==
Blake Soper and Danny Cooksey

=== Critical ===
Salute Your Shorts holds a 75% "Fresh" rating among critics on Rotten Tomatoes.

Craig Tomashoff of Entertainment Weekly gave the series premiere a rating of B+, comparing it favorably to Meatballs.

Lynn Heffley of Los Angeles Times described the series premiere as, "...a general celebration of crudity, stupidity and irrelevance."

The Twizard ranked the first-season episode "The Clinic" as the best of the series, further explaining that the episode, "...breaks down the psychology of Budnick's aggression and shows him at his most vulnerable".

Randall Colburn of The A.V. Club praised the second season addition of Blake Soper as Pinsky, arguing that while he was not a clear protagonist like Michael was during the first season, his neutrality strengthened the ensemble.

=== Awards ===
The show was nominated for Outstanding Young Ensemble Cast in a Television Series at the 13th Youth in Film Awards on December 1, 1991.

At the 14th Youth in Film Awards on January 16, 1993, several cast members were honoured: Heidi Lucas won Best Young Actress Co-Starring in a Cable Series, beating fellow cast members Megan Berwick and Venus DeMilo, who were also nominated; Michael Bower won Best Young Actor Co-Starring in a Cable Series, beating castmate Trevor Eyster, who was also nominated; and Danny Cooksey was nominated for Best Young Actor Starring in a Cable Series.

=== Ratings ===
The show was the second highest-rated cable television series with children aged 6–11 at the start of its second season in 1992.

Despite being in reruns for four years, the show finished as one of the 15 highest-rated basic cable series of 1996.

The show last aired on Nickelodeon on June 7, 2004, after winning a fan vote as part of the network's 25th-anniversary U-Pick Live programming.

== Cultural impact ==
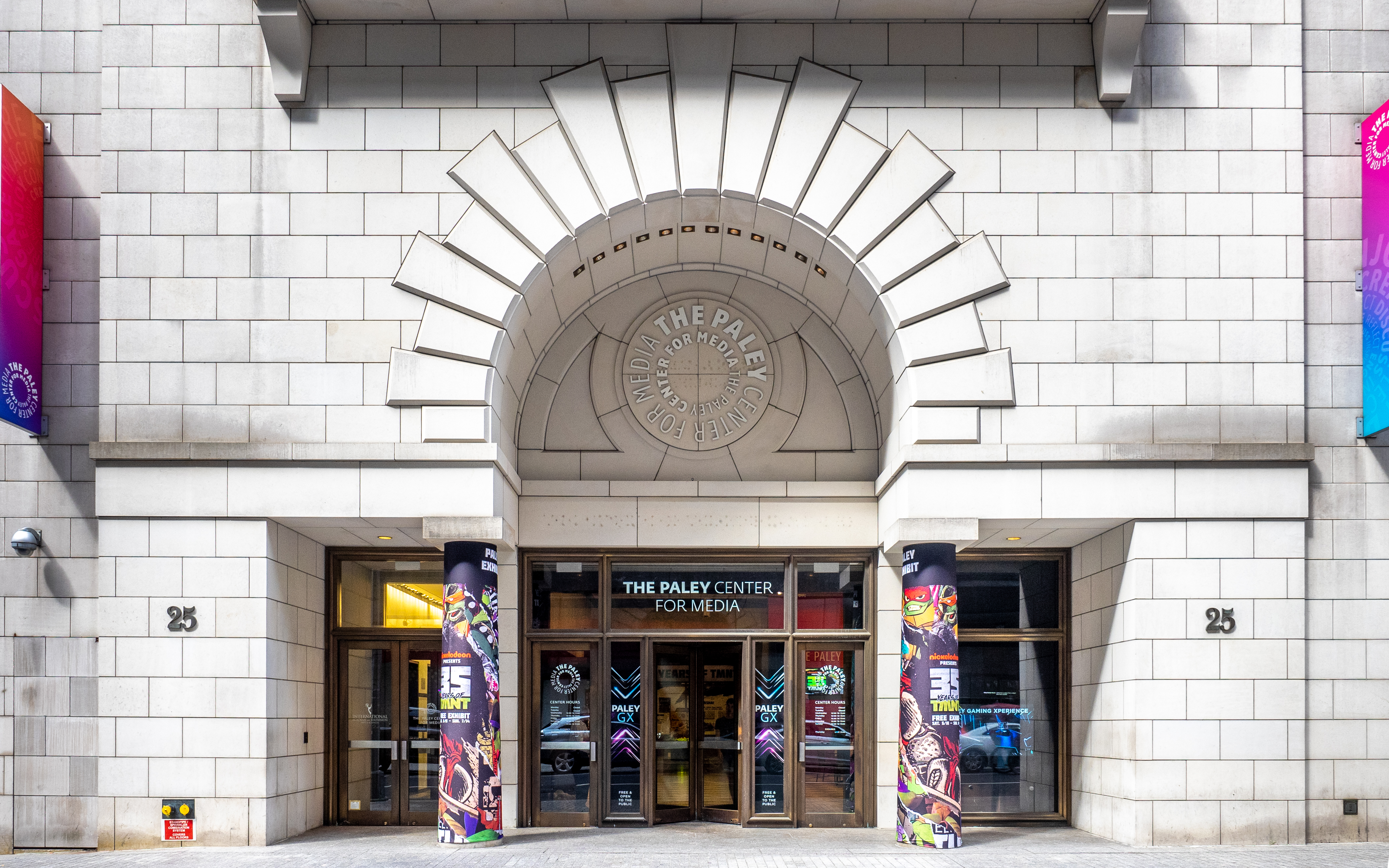
Paley Center for Media

Paley Center for Media has preserved the first-season episode "Sponge Saga" in its New York archive. The museum curates select television programming for its, "artistic achievement, social impact, or historic significance".

Danny Cooksey recorded the album Refugee with his band Bad4Good during filming of the second season in 1992. The song "Devil in the Angel" was written by Cooksey and Steve Vai for the two-part episode "Budnick and Dina in Love", but was left out of the show due to time constraints. Blake Soper and Michael Bower sang backing vocals on the album.

Following the show's cancellation, NBC offered Steve Slavkin the opportunity to write and produce Running the Halls, which aired as part of their Saturday Morning TNBC block in 1993. Ed Alton composed the show's music, Randall Miller served as director, and Michael Bower guest starred in "The Big Kiss".

Blake Soper wrote and performed the song "Spectacular Views (Salute My Shorts!)" with his band Rilo Kiley, which was featured as a hidden track on the vinyl release of Take Offs and Landings in 2001. Cooksey sang backing vocals on the album.

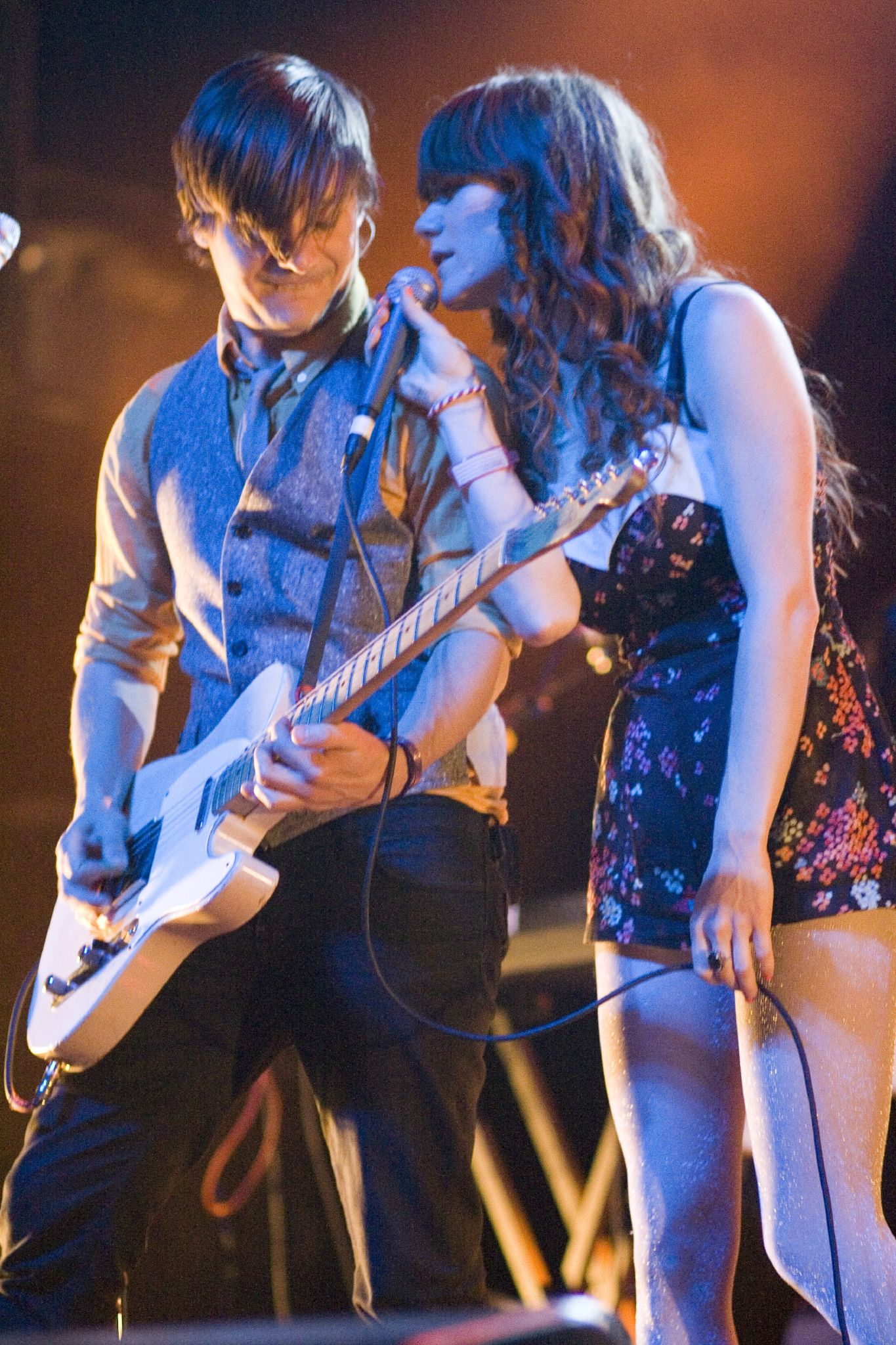
Rilo Kiley

Cooksey reprised his role of Budnick in 2007 for the "All My Friends" music video, which was the first single from A Few More Published Studies by The XYZ Affair. Jason Zimbler (Clarissa Explains It All), Marc Summers (Double Dare) and Michael Maronna (The Adventures of Pete & Pete) co-starred in the video.

Cooksey, Bower, Slavkin and Venus DeMilo were featured in the 2018 documentary The Orange Years, sharing their experiences on the show and exploring its place in Nickelodeon history.

A retrospective documentary about the series titled Forever Anawanna is in production, and will feature new interviews with the original cast and crew.

== Reunions ==
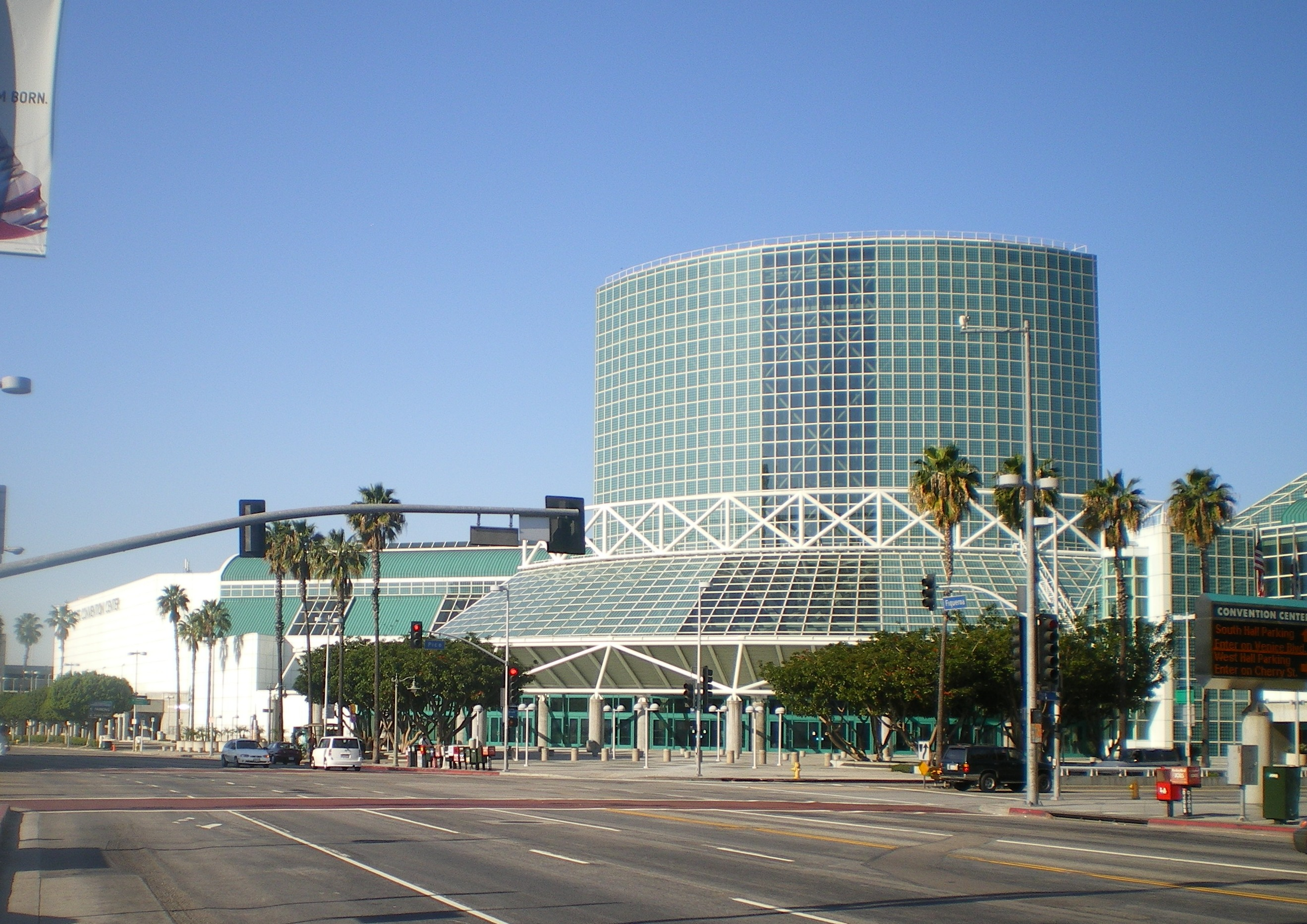
Los Angeles Convention Center

Members of the cast and crew reunited on September 15, 2012, for a Comikaze Expo panel at Los Angeles Convention Center. In attendance were Andrea Sherman (script supervisor), Danny Cooksey, Ed Alton (composer), Erik MacArthur, Kirk Baily, Larry Shapiro (associate producer), Michael Bower, Steve Slavkin, Tim Eyster and Venus DeMilo. Megan Berwick did not attend but sent a video message.

A 25th-anniversary reunion occurred on May 28, 2015, during Everything Is Festival at Hollywood Theatre. In attendance were MacArthur, Heidi Lucas, Baily, Berwick, Bower, Slavkin, Eyster and DeMilo. Cooksey did not attend as he was recording an album with the band Shelter Dogs.

Cooksey and Slavkin appeared on June 9, 2017, as part of the NickSplat panel at ATX Television Festival.

Members of the cast reunited on August 20, 2019, for a Salute Your Shorts trivia night at Nickelodeon's Good Burger pop-up restaurant in Los Angeles. In attendance were Cooksey, Baily, Berwick, Bower, Slavkin and DeMilo.

Bower and DeMilo appeared on October 12, 2019, as part of the L.A. Comic Con after party at Globe Theatre. They performed the Salute Your Shorts theme song onstage with The Flux Capacitors.

Berwick, Bower, Cooksey, DeMilo and Lucas all reunited on the Splat Attack Podcast on July 1, 2026 for a 35th anniversary celebration of the show.

== Distribution ==
Reruns of the show continued airing regularly on Nickelodeon from 1993 to 1999.

The series was never released into syndication, but has aired on other Nickelodeon branded channels.

Nickelodeon in the United Kingdom aired reruns of the show from 1993 to 1994. Nickelodeon GAS aired reruns of the show in 2003 as part of Camp GAS. TeenNick aired reruns of the show from 2011 to 2015 as part of The '90s Are All That.

The original pilot was first uploaded to YouTube by Ian Giatti in January 2023.

== Home media ==
The complete series has never been released on any form of home media.

When TVShowsOnDVD.com shut down their website in May 2018, Salute Your Shorts was the #1 user-voted television show that had yet to see a physical release on DVD or Blu-ray. Tim Eyster attempted to work with the rightsholder on a DVD release, but it was determined the cost of music licensing and royalty payments to the cast would make such a release unprofitable.

As of 2022, Amazon has twelve episodes of the show available for online purchase. iTunes and Paramount+ offer ten of those same episodes.
