= 13th Youth in Film Awards =

1991 US media awards ceremony

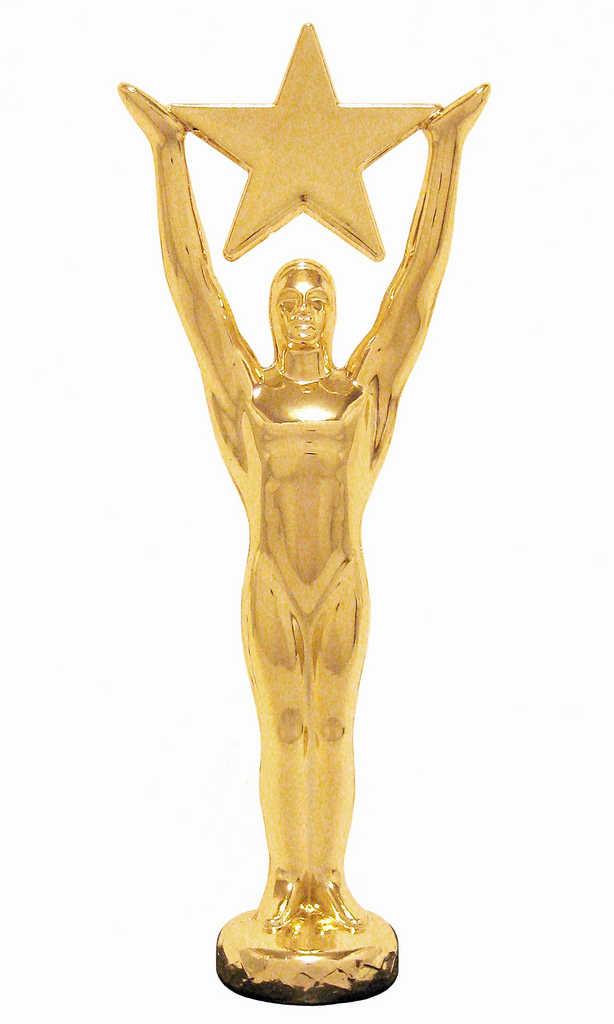
- Awarded for: Achievement in the 1990—1991
- Date: December 1, 1991
- Site: Academy of Television Arts & Sciences; North Hollywood, California
- Hosted by: Joey Lawrence, Eugene Byrd and Seth Green

The 13th Youth in Film Awards ceremony (now known as the Young Artist Awards), presented by the Youth in Film Association, honored outstanding youth performers under the age of 21 in the fields of film and television for the 1990–1991 season, and took place on December 1, 1991, at the Academy of Television Arts & Sciences in North Hollywood, California.

Established in 1978 by long-standing Hollywood Foreign Press Association member, Maureen Dragone, the Youth in Film Association was the first organization to establish an awards ceremony specifically set to recognize and award the contributions of performers under the age of 21 in the fields of film, television, theater and music.

== Categories ==
★ Bold indicates the winner in each category.

== Best Young Performer in a Motion Picture ==
=== Best Young Actor Starring in a Motion Picture ===
★ Ethan Randall Embry – Dutch (20th Century Fox) as Doyle Standish

- Jonathan Brandis – The NeverEnding Story II: The Next Chapter (Warner Bros) as Bastian Balthazar Bux
- Balthazar Getty – My Heroes Have Always Been Cowboys (Samuel-Goldwyn) as Jud Meadows
- Lukas Haas – Rambling Rose (Seven Arts Pictures) as Willcox "Buddy" Hillyer
- Stian Smestad – Shipwrecked (Walt Disney) as Haakon Haakonson
- Robert J. Steinmiller Jr. – Bingo (TriStar) as Chuckie Devlin
- Elijah Wood – Paradise (Buena Vista) as Willard Young

=== Best Young Actress Starring in a Motion Picture ===
★ Thora Birch – Paradise (Buena Vista) as Billie Pike

- Mikki Allen – Regarding Henry (Paramount) as Rachel Turner
- Angela Goethals – V.I. Warshawki (Buena Vista) as Katherine "Kat" Grafalk
- Milla Jovovich – Return to the Blue Lagoon (Columbia) as Lilli Hargrave
- Heather Graham – Shout (Universal) as Sara Benedict
- Reese Witherspoon – The Man in the Moon (MGM) as Danielle "Dani" Trant

=== Best Young Actor Co-Starring in a Motion Picture ===
★ Daniel Newman – Robin Hood: Prince of Thieves (Warner Bros) as Wulf

- Michael Bacall – Shout (Universal) as Big Boy
- Kenny Blank – The Super (20th Century Fox) as Tito
- Danny Cooksey – Terminator 2: Judgment Day (TriStar) as Tim
- Gregor Hesse – Dead Again (Paramount) as Frankie
- Kenny Morrison – The NeverEnding Story II: The Next Chapter (Warner Bros) as Atreyu
- Ernie Reyes, Jr. – Teenage Mutant Ninja Turtles II: The Secret of the Ooze (New Line Cinema) as Keno

=== Best Young Actress Co-Starring in a Motion Picture ===
★ Sheila Rosenthal – Not Without My Daughter (MGM) as Mahtob Mahmoody

- Louisa Haigh – Shipwrecked (Walt Disney) as Mary
- Lisa Jakub – Rambling Rose (Seven Arts Pictures) as Frances "Dolly" Hillyer
- Danielle Harris – Don't Tell Mom the Babysitter's Dead (Warner Bros) as Melissa Crandell
- Ivyann Schwan – Problem Child 2 (Universal) as Trixie Young
- Emily Warfield – The Man in the Moon (MGM) as Maureen Trant

== Best Young Performer in a TV Movie or Special ==
=== Best Young Actor Starring in a television film ===
★ Lukas Haas – The Perfect Tribute (ABC) as Benjamin Blair

- Lane Davis – Triumph of the Heart: The Ricky Bell Story (CBS) as Ryan Blankenship
- Matthew Lawrence – The Summer My Father Grew Up (NBC) as Timmy
- Ryan Todd – Mrs. Lambert Remembers Love (CBS) as Jared Lambert

=== Best Young Actress Starring in a TV Movie ===
★ Ariana Richards – Switched at Birth (NBC) as Kimberly Mays (Age 9-11)

- Kimberly Cullum – The Sitter (FOX) as Melissa Jones
- Erika Flores – Switched at Birth (NBC) as Arlena Twigg (Age 9)
- Jenny Lewis – Runaway Father (CBS) as Marcia

=== Best Young Actor Starring in a Cable Special ===
★ Eugene Byrd – Perfect Harmony (Disney Channel) as Landy Allen

- Joey Lawrence – Chains of Gold as Tommy Burke
- Jared Rushton – A Cry in the Wild (PBS) as Brian Robeson
- Justin Whalin – Perfect Harmony (Disney Channel) as Taylor Bradshaw

=== Best Young Actress Starring in a Cable Special ===
★ Sarah Sawatsky – The Girl from Mars (Atlantic Films) as Deedee Puttman

- Olivia Burnette – Final Verdict (TNT) as Nora Rogers
- Nicki Vannice – Sapphire Man as Dix
- Juliet Sorcey – Never Forget (TNT) as Edie Mermelstein

== Best Young Performer in a Television Series ==
=== Best Young Actor Starring in a Television Series ===
★ Neil Patrick Harris – Doogie Howser, M.D. (ABC) as Dr. Douglas "Doogie" Howser

- Jay R. Ferguson – Evening Shade (CBS) as Taylor Newton
- Johnny Galecki – American Dreamer (NBC) as Danny Nash
- Omri Katz – Eerie, Indiana (NBC) as Marshall Teller
- Corin Nemec – Parker Lewis Can't Lose (FOX) as Parker Lloyd Lewis
- Scott Weinger – The Family Man (CBS) as Steve Taylor

=== Best Young Actress Starring in a Television Series ===
★ Kellie Martin – Life Goes On (ABC) as Rebecca "Becca" Thatcher

- Maia Brewton – Parker Lewis Can't Lose (FOX) as Shelly Ann Lewis
- Shannen Doherty – Beverly Hills, 90210 (FOX) as Brenda Walsh
- Candace Hutson – Evening Shade (CBS) as Molly Newton
- Marisa Ryan – Major Dad (CBS) as Elizabeth Cooper MacGillis

=== Outstanding Young Comedian in a Television Series ===
★ Adam Jeffries – True Colors (FOX) as Lester Freeman

- David Faustino – Married... with Children (FOX) as Bud Bundy
- Seth Green – Good & Evil (ABC) as David Sandler

=== Outstanding Young Comedienne in a Television Series ===
★ Sara Gilbert – Roseanne (ABC) as Darlene Conner

- Tatyana M. Ali – The Fresh Prince of Bel-Air (NBC) as Ashley Banks
- Kellie Shanygne Williams – Family Matters (CBS) as Laura Lee Winslow

=== Best Young Actor Starring in a New Television Series ===
★ Trevor Bullock – Davis Rules (ABC) as Robbie Davis

- Brandon Call – Step by Step (CBS) as John Thomas "J.T." Lambert
- Danny Gerard – Brooklyn Bridge (CBS) as Alan Silver
- Joey Lawrence – Blossom (NBC) as Joseph "Joey" Russo
- Larenz Tate – The Royal Family (CBS) as Curtis Winston

=== Best Young Actress Starring in a New Television Series ===
★ Sylver Gregory – The Royal Family (CBS) as Kim Winston

- Meghan Andrews – Flesh 'n' Blood (NBC) as Beauty Weed
- Mayim Bialik – Blossom (NBC) as Blossom Ruby Russo
- Olivia Burnette – The Torkelsons (NBC) as Dorothy Jane Torkelson
- Staci Keanan – Step by Step (CBS) as Dana Foster
- Ashlee Levitch – I'll Fly Away (NBC) as Francie Bedford

=== Best Young Actor Starring in an Off-Prime Time or Cable Series ===
★ Richard Ian Cox – The Adventures of the Black Stallion (Family Channel) as Alec Ramsey

- Robert Gavin – Land of the Lost (ABC) as Kevin Porter
- Mark-Paul Gosselaar – Saved by the Bell (NBC) as Zachary "Zack" Morris
- Mario Lopez – Saved by the Bell (NBC) as Albert Clifford "A.C." Slater
- Will Nipper – The New Lassie (KCOP) as Will McCullough
- Sean O'Neal – Clarissa Explains It All (Nickelodeon) as Samuel "Sam" Anders
- Jaimz Woolvett – Dog House (TV series) (Accolade Releasing) as Richard Underwood

=== Best Young Actress Starring in an Off-Prime Time or Cable Series ===
★ Melissa Joan Hart – Clarissa Explains It All (Nickelodeon) as Clarissa Marie Darling

- Elizabeth Berkley – Saved by the Bell (NBC) as Jessica "Jessie" Spano
- Wendy Cox – The New Lassie (KCOP) as Megan McCullough
- Jenny Drugan – Land of the Lost (ABC) as Anamarie "Annie" Porter
- Carol Ann Plante – Harry and the Hendersons (FOX) as Sarah Henderson
- Tiffani-Amber Thiessen – Saved by the Bell (NBC) as Kelly Kapowski
- Lark Voorhies – Saved by the Bell (NBC) as Lisa Turtle

=== Best Young Actor Co-Starring in a Television Series ===
★ Brian Austin Green – Beverly Hills 90210 (FOX) as David Silver

- Dustin Berkovitz – Sisters (NBC) as Evan Whitsig
- Leonardo DiCaprio – Growing Pains (ABC) as Luke Brower
- Jeremy Jackson – Baywatch (Syndication) as Hobie Buchannon
- Rigoberto Jimenez – Davis Rules (ABC) as Rigo Cordona
- Christopher Pettiet – The Young Riders (ABC) as Jesse James
- Justin Shenkarow – Eerie, Indiana (NBC) as Simon Holmes

=== Best Young Actress Co-Starring in a Television Series ===
★ Jennie Garth – Beverly Hills, 90210 (FOX) as Kelly Taylor

- Andrea Barber – Full House (ABC) as Kimmy Gibbler
- Danica McKellar – The Wonder Years (ABC) as Gwendolyn "Winnie" Cooper
- Lisa Rieffel – The Trials of Rosie O'Neill (CBS) as Kim Ginty
- Lisa Dean Ryan – Doogie Howser, M.D. (ABC) as Wanda Plenn
- Tori Spelling – Beverly Hills, 90210 (FOX) as Donna Martin
- Jenna von Oÿ – Blossom (NBC) as Six Dorothy LeMeure

=== Best Young Actor Co-Starring in an Off-Prime Time or Cable Series ===
★ Zachary Bostrom – Harry and the Hendersons (FOX) as Ernie Henderson

- Andrew Bednarski – Rin Tin Tin K-9 Cops (CTV) as Steve Katts
- Jordan Christopher Michael – Sessions
- Kevin Osgood – The Mickey Mouse Club (Disney Channel)
- Avi Phillips – Maniac Mansion (Family Channel) as Ike Edison
- Josiah Trager – Big Brother Jake (Family Channel) as Loomis "Lou" Washington
- Jason Zimbler – Clarissa Explains It All (Nickelodeon) as Ferguson W. Darling

=== Best Young Actress Co-Starring in an Off-Prime Time or Cable Series ===
★ Gabrielle Carmouche – Big Brother Jake (Family Channel) as Katerie Monroe

- Valentina Cardinalli – Dog House (Accolade Releasing) as Annabelle Underwood
- Jennifer Crystal – Sessions
- Kathleen Robertson – Maniac Mansion (Family Channel) as Tina Edison

=== Best Young Actor Guest-Starring or Recurring Role in a TV Series ===
★ Brandon Crane – The Wonder Years (ABC) as Doug Porter

- Brandon Quintin Adams – Drexell's Class (FOX) as Oscar
- Tevin Campbell – The Fresh Prince of Bel-Air (NBC) as Little T
- Grant Gelt – Northern Exposure (CBS) as Kid Joel
- John Christian Graas – The New Zorro (Family Channel) as Pepe
- Jason Marsden – Anything But Love (ABC)
- Michael Oliver – Drexell's Class (FOX) as Mitchell
- Justin Whalin – Blossom (NBC) as Jimmy

=== Best Young Actress Guest-Starring or Recurring Role in a TV Series ===
★ Robin Lynn Heath – Davis Rules (ABC) as Debbie Kessler

- Erika Flores – The Owl (Lorimar) as Lisa
- Ami Foster – Empty Nest (NBC) as Wanda Sue
- Lisa Gerber – The Wonder Years (ABC) as Cara
- Crystal McKellar – The Wonder Years (ABC) as Becky Slater
- Alisan Porter – The Golden Girls (NBC) as Melissa
- Jodi Peterson – The New Lassie (KCOP) as Tracy
- Tori Spelling – Saved by the Bell (NBC) as Violet Bickerstaff

=== Best Young Actor in a Daytime Series ===
★ Scott Groff – Days of Our Lives (NBC) as Shawn Douglas-Brady

- Bryan Buffinton – Guiding Light (CBS) as Billy Lewis III
- Brandon Farmer – Santa Barbara (NBC) as Chip Castillo
- Glenn Walker Harris Jr. – General Hospital (ABC) as Sly Eckert
- Tommy Michaels – All My Children (ABC) as Timmy Hunter

=== Best Young Actress in a Daytime Series ===
★ Rachel Miner – Guiding Light (CBS) as Michelle Bauer

- Suzanne Ekerling – General Hospital (ABC) as Jody
- Irene Ng – All My Children (ABC) as An Li Chen Bodine #1
- Ashley Peldon – Guiding Light (CBS) as Marah Lewis
- Vicki Wauchope – Santa Barbara (NBC) as Young Eden

=== Outstanding Voice-Over in an Animation Series ===
★ Joshua Wiener – Back to the Future: The Animated Series (CBS) as Jules Brown

- Chris Allport – Peter Pan and the Pirates (FOX) as Tootles
- Anndi McAfee – Dink, the Little Dinosaur (CBS) as Amber
- Jason Marsden – Peter Pan and the Pirates (FOX) as Peter Pan
- Janna Michaels – TaleSpin (Disney Channel) as Molly Elizabeth Cunningham
- R.J. Williams – TaleSpin (Disney Channel) as Kit Cloudkicker

== Best Young Performer Under 10 Years of Age ==
=== Exceptional Performance by a Young Actor Under 10 ===
★ Taran Noah Smith – Home Improvement (ABC) as Mark Taylor

- John Aaron Bennett – I'll Fly Away (NBC) as John Morgan Bedford
- Tahj Mowry – Full House (ABC) as Teddy
- Lee Norris – The Torkelsons (NBC) as Chuckie Lee Torkelson
- Jacob Parker – Evening Shade (CBS) as Will Newton
- Matthew Louis Seigel – Brooklyn Bridge (CBS) as Nathaniel Silver

=== Exceptional Performance by a Young Actress Under 10 ===
★ Mary-Kate and Ashley Olsen – Full House (ABC) as Michelle Tanner

- Rachel Duncan – The Torkelsons (NBC) as Mary Sue Torkelson
- Ashley Johnson – Growing Pains (ABC) as Christine Ellen "Chrissy" Seaver
- Amber Rose Kelly – The Girl Who Came Between Them (NBC) as Amanda Huntoon
- Bethany Richards – Switched at Birth (NBC) as Kim Mays (Age 4-6)
- Naya Rivera – The Royal Family (CBS) as Hillary Winston

== Best Young Ensemble Performance ==
=== Outstanding Young Ensemble Cast in a Motion Picture ===
★ Boyz n the Hood (Columbia) – Desi Arnez Hines II as Young Tre, Baha Jackson as Young Doughboy and Donovan McCrary as Young Ricky

- Don't Tell Mom the Babysitter's Dead (Warner Bros) – Christina Applegate as Sue Ellen "Swell" Crandell, Christopher Pettiet as Zach Crandell, Danielle Harris as Melissa Crandell, Keith Coogan as Kenny Crandell and Robert Hy Gorman as Walter Crandell
- Toy Soldiers (TriStar) – Sean Astin as William "Billy" Tepper, Wil Wheaton as Joseph "Joey" Trotta, Keith Coogan as Jonathan "Snuffy" Bradberry, T.E. Russell as Henry "Hank" Giles III and George Perez as Ricardo "Ricky" Montoya

=== Outstanding Young Ensemble Cast in a Television Series ===
★ Beverly Hills, 90210 (FOX) – Jason Priestley as Brandon Walsh, Shannen Doherty as Brenda Walsh, Luke Perry as Dylan McKay, Brian Austin Green as David Silver, Jennie Garth as Kelly Taylor, Ian Ziering as Steve Sanders, Tori Spelling as Donna Martin, and Gabrielle Carteris as Andrea Zuckerman

- Full House (ABC) - Candace Cameron Bure as D.J. Tanner, Jodie Sweetin as Stephanie Tanner, Mary-Kate and Ashley Olsen as Michelle Tanner, Andrea Barber as Kimmy Gibbler, and Tahj Mowry as Teddy
- Step by Step (ABC) - Josh Byrne as Brendan Lambert, Christopher Castile as Mark Foster, Brandon Call as John Thomas "J.T." Lambert, Staci Keanan as Dana Foster, Christine Lakin as Alicia "Al" Lambert, and Angela Watson as Karen Foster
- Drexell's Class (FOX) - Jason Biggs as Willie Trancas, Heidi Zeigler as Nicole Finnigan, Damian Cagnolatti as Kenny Sanders, Matthew Lawrence as Walker, A.J. Langer as Melissa Drexell, Brittany Murphy as Brenda Drexell, Jacqueline Donnelly as Bernadette, and Matthew Slowik as Lionel
- Saved by the Bell (NBC) – Mark-Paul Gosselaar as Zachary "Zack" Morris, Mario Lopez as Albert Clifford "A.C." Slater, Dustin Diamond as Samuel "Screech" Powers, Tiffani Thiessen as Kelly Kapowski, Elizabeth Berkley as Jessica "Jessie" Spano, and Lark Voorhies as Lisa Turtle
- Salute Your Shorts (Nickelodeon) - Danny Cooksey as Bobby Budnick, Heidi Lucas as Dina Alexander, Megan Berwick as Z.Z. Ziff, Venus DeMilo Thomas as Telly Radford, Michael Bower as Eddie 'Donkeylips' Gelfen, Trevor Eyster as Sponge Harris, and Henry W. Laster as Kent Flankman
- The Wonder Years (ABC) - Fred Savage as Kevin Arnold, Danica McKellar as Gwendolyn "Winnie" Cooper, Josh Saviano as Paul Joshua Pfeiffer, Jason Hervey as Wayne Arnold, and Michael Tricario as Randy Mitchell

== Best Young Hosts for a Variety or Game Show ==
=== Outstanding Hosts for a Youth Variety or Game Show ===
★ Wild and Crazy Kids (Nickelodeon) – Omar Gooding, Jessica Gaynes and Donnie Jeffcoat

- Wide World of Kids – Jason Hervey and Scott Grimes
- Youthquake (USA Network) – Jennifer Spears
- Wake, Rattle, and Roll (Disney Channel) – R.J. Williams as Sam Baxter

== Best Family Television Entertainment ==
=== Best New Family Television Series ===
★ Brooklyn Bridge (CBS)

- Blossom (NBC)
- Davis Rules (ABC)
- Eerie, Indiana (NBC)
- Home Improvement (ABC)
- The Torkelsons (NBC)

=== Best Off-Prime Time or Cable Family Series ===
★ Harry and the Hendersons (FOX)

- The Adventures of the Black Stallion (Family Channel)
- Big Brother Jake (Family Channel)
- Land of the Lost (ABC)
- Saved by the Bell (NBC)
- The New Lassie (KCOP)
- The New Zorro (Family Channel)
- The Wonder Years (ABC)

=== Outstanding New Animation Series ===
★ Back to the Future: The Animated Series (CBS)

- Darkwing Duck (ABC)
- Doug (Nickelodeon)
- Space Cats (NBC)
- Taz-Mania (FOX)
- Where in the World is Carmen Sandiego (PBS)
- Where's Waldo (CBS)

== Best Family Motion Picture Entertainment ==
=== Best Family Motion Picture: Comedy ===
★ What About Bob? (Buena Vista)

- Bingo (Tri-Star)
- Don't Tell Mom the Babysitter's Dead (Warner Bros)
- Dutch (20th Century Fox)

=== Best Family Motion Picture: Drama ===
★ Robin Hood: Prince of Thieves (Warner Bros)

- The Doctor (Buena Vista)
- The NeverEnding Story II: The Next Chapter (Warner Bros)
- Paradise (Buena Vista)
- Regarding Henry (Paramount)
- Shipwrecked (Walt Disney)

== Youth In Film's Special Awards ==
=== Inspiration To Youth ===
★ Gregory Scott, Director

=== Outstanding Contribution to Children Through Music ===
★ Lisa Marie Nelson, Composer

=== The Michael Landon Award ===
==== A Tribute ====
★ Michael Landon, Producer (Posthumous) – Accepted by Christopher Landon

=== The Mickey Rooney Award ===
==== Former Child Stars ====
★ Brandon Cruz & Gloria Jean

=== Most Promising Young Newcomer ===
★ Edward Furlong

=== Hall of Fame Award ===
★ Christopher Burke

=== Outstanding Young Actor in a Foreign Film ===
★ Julien Ciamaca (France) – My Father's Glory & My Mother's Castle as Marcel Pagnol

=== Outstanding Young Actress in a Foreign Film ===
★ Marie Kleivdal Kristiansen (Norway) – Måker as Kristina

=== Best Family Foreign Film ===
★ My Father's Glory & My Mother's Castle (France) – Directed by Yves Robert
