= L.A. Comic Con =

Annual Los Angeles multi-genre convention

- Former logo as Stan Lee's Comikaze
- Status: Active
- Genre: Speculative fiction
- Venue: Los Angeles Convention Center
- Locations: Los Angeles, California, U.S.
- Coordinates: 34.039737°N 118.270293°W
- Country: United States
- Inaugurated: November 5, 2011; 15 years ago (as Comikaze Expo)
- Most recent: October 30, 2026; 11 days ago
- Next event: October 22, 2027; 11 months' time
- Attendance: 126,600 in 2022
- Website: www.comicconla.com

L.A. Comic Con is a three-day multi-genre convention held annually in downtown Los Angeles, California. L.A. Comic Con is one of the largest independent conventions in the United States and encompasses several categories, including comics, horror, sci-fi, anime, gaming, and pop culture, with a particular focus on the local Los Angeles community.

The convention was founded as Comikaze Expo in 2011 by Regina Carpinelli and her two younger brothers, fans of geek culture from Temecula, California. The convention went through several rebrandings – first to "Stan Lee's Comikaze Expo" and then "Stan Lee's LA Comic Con". L.A. Comic Con is also known as "LACC" and is often described as "A convention created by fans, for fans."

Originally founded as an event to showcase local Los Angeles talent, the first Comikaze Expo in 2011 primarily featured local artists, comic book publishers and dealers, and various celebrity appearances including horror icon Elvira. The convention has grown since then to include a wider variety of entertainment and popular cultures including fantasy, horror, comic books, manga, western animation, toys, and video games. The Con has grown in size every year, starting with 35,000 attendees in 2011 and expanding to over 123,000 attendees in 2019. The convention has drawn big names to match its big crowds, with celebrities like Elijah Wood, Ron Perlman, Gabriel Iglesias, Dwayne "The Rock" Johnson, and Gerard Way attending in years' past.

== History ==
Regina Carpinelli and her two younger brothers, fans of geek culture from Temecula, California, were regular attendees of San Diego Comic-Con. After moving to Los Angeles, Regina Carpinelli decided that the city needed a large-scale comic book convention. The three Carinellis set up Comikaze Entertainment Inc. and started out to organize one.

The first event, called Comikaze Expo, was held on November 5–6, 2011 in the Kentia Hall of the Los Angeles Convention Center. The large exhibitor space featured local artists, tattoo artists, comic book dealers, comic book publishers, press vendors, designers and collectibles merchants. There was an Artists' Alley where celebrities and artists signed autographs and sold portraits. Traditional contests and gaming tournaments included the Cosplay Contest, the Masquerade, Magic The Gathering, Yu-Gi-Oh, Warhammer, and several original Nintendo games. There were also panels featuring various celebrities, reunions, and upcoming feature films. Among the events was horror icon Elvira's last convention appearance. There were about 35,000 attendees throughout the weekend.

In 2012, veteran creator Stan Lee and his company, POW! Entertainment, as well as Cassandra Peterson (better known as Elvira), formed a partnership with Comikaze Expo, and the convention was rebranded as Stan Lee's Comikaze. That same year, Advanstar joined Stan Lee's Comikaze Expo as a strategic partner, taking on the event's "back end" work managing deals with unions, the convention center, and other "business" aspects of the show.

The 2012 show was held in the South Hall of the Los Angeles Convention Center, and featured about 600 artists and vendors, including gaming publisher Activision, who launched several new games. New activities included a 75,000 sg ft Zombie Apocalypse obstacle course, a Quidditch pitch, and a NERF dart battle hosted by Max Landis. Panel discussions were displayed on a 14 ft jumbotron, including Kevin Smith, a live version of Fatman on Batman with Adam West, a version of the Dating Game with Adrianne Curry, and a Q&A with Stan Lee and Todd McFarlane. That year the show had about 50,000 attendees.

In September 2013, a reality show, Fangasm, premiered on SyFy. The show followed the experiences of seven pop culture fans as they lived together in a Los Angeles apartment building and interned at Stan Lee's Comikaze Expo, vying for his attention and approval. The show was hosted by Regina Carpinelli.

In 2014 the show introduced Club Nokia, a free Cosplay Dance party for its attendees.

For the 2016's edition, the convention was renamed Stan Lee's L.A. Comic Con. The show continued to include panel discussions on a variety of topics, and an all-night dance party.

L.A. Comic Con 2018 was dubbed LACC's "Octoversary", as the eighth show in the convention's history. The show featured a celebration of Fangoria, a horror film magazine. Elijah Wood appeared at the con to promote SpectreVision's film "Mandy", and attendees also got a private screening of "Mandy". Tenacious D appeared on a main stage panel for a Q&A about Post-Apocalypto. The cast of Marvel's "Agents of Shield" also held a main stage panel, as did Marvel's Runaways.

In 2019, L.A. Comic Con continued expanding its show floor by adding more programming and event categories, leading the show to be described as "one of the most diverse celebrations of pop culture in Los Angeles."

The 2019 con saw the addition of a full "Horror" section to the con and over 800 exhibitors. New exhibits included a Jay and Silent Bob Reboot photo op with Kevin Smith and Jason Mewes in front of the 30 ft Quick Stop Facade an exhibition of famous automobiles from the Petersen Automotive Museum and a live wrestling event with Women of Wrestling. LG Display had an activation on the exhibit floor with an OLED TV Truck on the convention floor. On Friday October 11, the first night of L.A. Comic Con, KROQ's Stryker and Klein broadcast live from the LACC VIP Lounge for 4 hours.

== Programming ==
L.A. Comic Con is often described as a convention "by fans, for fans," largely because of its reputation for being communicative with their attendees and incorporating fan requests into the convention's programming. LA Comic Con 2019 made several major programming decisions based on convention attendees' responses to an email survey, including adding a horror section to the convention and bringing in the casts of The Office and SpongeBob SquarePants.

In addition to their focus on fan-friendly programming, L.A. Comic Con also prides itself as being a family-friendly event. The convention is open for free to children 12 and under with an adult who has a 1-Day or 3-Day badge. The convention also has an annual tradition of hosting an Indoor Trick-Or-Treat event on Sundays for children 12 and under for The Indoor Trick-Or-Treat event traditionally goes on for two hours' on the 3rd and final day of the con. Children can trick-or-treat at any of the convention's booths or tables.

L.A. Comic Con 2019 included programming driven by major feature films, including a main stage panel for the feature film "Zombieland: Double Tap" with the cast and director of the film and an early pre-release screening for convention attendees.

L.A. Comic Con 2019 had several high-profile main stage panels. There were several cast reunions, including a "Hellboy" reunion with Ron Perlman and Doug Jones, a reunion panel with the cast of "The Office" and a reunion of the cast of "X-Men: The Animated Series".

Other 2019 programming included a panel interview with the Incredible Hulk's Lou Ferrigno and Flash Gordon's Sam Jones, The Ultimate Spider-Man's Drake Bell a main-stage panel with the cast of Steven Universe and the cast of the film Daniel Isn't Real.

L.A. Comic Con also hosts the Annual National Cosplay Championship. The inaugural cosplay competition took place in 2015 The National Cosplay Championship has reoccurred at L.A. Comic Con every year, with the fifth Annual Cosplay National Championship at the 2019 L.A. Comic Con being officially presented by Disney's "Maleficent: Mistress of Evil".

== Exclusive collectibles ==
L.A. Comic Con annually boasts collectible items that are exclusively available at a given year's convention. In 2019, L.A. Comic Con's exclusive collectibles included Funko Pops from Hot Topic.

Hot Topic has been a major partner of L.A. Comic Con since 2017, having sponsored and provided exclusive merchandise for the con in 2017, 2018, and 2019.

== Convention leadership and organization ==
Chris DeMoulin is L.A. Comic Con's current CEO, having worked with the convention since its second year in 2012. Growing up as a fan of comics since he was a young child, Chris DeMoulin amassed a large collection of comic books before he had to sell them as a young adult to pay for his college education. Mr. DeMoulin's passion for the comic books led him to build L.A. Comic Con as a fan-driven, community-oriented convention.

The convention maintains a full-time team of just under 10 employees throughout the year, and seasonally expands annually to employ 150 staff during the convention's official event weekend.

== Stan Lee's legacy at the Con ==
Formerly known as "Stan Lee's L.A. Comic Con", Stan Lee formed a partnership with the convention in 2012 and continued working with the event until his passing in 2018. Lee was motivated to work with L.A. Comic Con based on their fan-motivated organizational culture. Comikaze Entertainment CEO Chris DeMoulin stated "I think he felt the legacy of what we wanted to create here was safe in our hands, because we were honest-to-goodness fans, not just business people looking to make a buck."

L.A. Comic Con 2019, the first since Lee's death, featured numerous dedications to his legacy, including a memorial wall inviting attendees to write their well-wishes in his memory and a main stage panel hosted by Deadpool co-creator Rob Liefeld in Lee's honor.

== Events ==
Dates	Location	Approximate Attendance	Guests
November 5–6, 2011	Los Angeles Convention Center; Los Angeles, California	35,000	Stan Lee, Elvira, Mark Hamill, Tony Todd, Ernest Borgnine, Tippi Hedren, Morgan Fairchild, Robert Venditti, Marina Sirtis, Garrett Wang, Robert Beltran, Sybil Danning, Jhonen Vasquez, Cast of Nickelodeon's All That (Kel Mitchell, Josh Server, Lori Beth Denberg, Katrina Johnson, Alisa Reyes, Angelique Bates and Lisa Foiles), Cast of Bad Kids Go to Hell, Cast of Police Academy, Select Cast of Star Trek: Voyager and Star Trek: Deep Space Nine
September 15–16, 2012	Los Angeles Convention Center; Los Angeles, California	45,000	Stan Lee, Elvira, Adam West, Burt Ward, Todd McFarlane, Kevin Smith, Mark Hamill, Norman Reedus, Tony Todd, Felicia Day, Tara Strong, Dana Snyder, Julie Newmar, Neal Adams, Marv Wolfman, Zak Penn, Lou Ferrigno, Daphne Ashbrook, Ron Glass, Amber Benson, Kevin J. Anderson, J. Scott Campbell, Tony Moore, Marc Silvestri, Cast of Nickelodeon's Salute Your Shorts (Michael Ray Bower, Danny Cooksey, Kirk Baily, Venus DeMilo, Trevor Eyster and Erik MacArthur)
November 1–3, 2013	Los Angeles Convention Center; Los Angeles, California	55,000	Stan Lee, Elvira, "Weird Al" Yankovic, Bruce Campbell, Michael Rooker, LeVar Burton, Tony Todd, Edward James Olmos, Dean Cain, Alyssa Milano, RuPaul, Louie Anderson, Lou Ferrigno, James Hong, Lynne Marie Stewart, Lori Petty, Paris Themmen, Naomi Grossman, Lisa Foiles, Michael Ray Bower, Phil Moore, Jon Schnepp, Richard Horvitz, Rikki Simons, Jim Cummings, Bill Farmer, Jhonen Vasquez, Cast of The Powerpuff Girls (Catherine Cavadini, E.G. Daily and Tara Strong), Cast of Nickelodeon's The Adventures of Pete & Pete (Mike Maronna, Danny Tamberelli), Cast of AMC's Comic Book Men (Mike Zapcic, Ming Chen and Robert Bruce)
November 2, 2014	Los Angeles Convention Center; Los Angeles, California	65,000	Stan Lee, Elvira, Kevin Smith, Kevin Conroy, Burt Ward, Gwendoline Christie, Alfie Allen, Stephen Moyer, Kristin Bauer, Barbara Eden, Mindy Sterling, John Barrowman, Jewel Staite, Tara Strong, Howie Mandel, James Hong, Eric Roberts, Tommy Wiseau, Original Power Rangers cast (David Yost, Walter Emanuel Jones), Cast of AMC's Comic Book Men (Bryan Johnson, Mike Zapcic, Ming Chen and Robert Bruce)
November 1, 2015	Los Angeles Convention Center; Los Angeles, California	70,000	Stan Lee, Elvira, Carrie Fisher, Todd McFarlane, Grant Morrison, Rob Liefeld, Summer Glau, Nichelle Nichols, Jon Schnepp, Grumpy Cat, Cast of Nickelodeon's All That (Kel Mitchell, Josh Server, Lori Beth Denberg, Katrina Johnson, Alisa Reyes, Angelique Bates, Danny Tamberelli and Lisa Foiles), Cast of Nickelodeon's The Adventures of Pete & Pete (Mike Maronna, Danny Tamberelli)
October 28–30, 2016	Los Angeles Convention Center; Los Angeles, California	91,000	Stan Lee, Rob Liefeld, Alan Tudyk, Mike Colter, Chris Hardwick, Adam West, Burt Ward, Darryl McDaniels, Gerard Way, Taboo, Lance Henriksen, Neal Adams, Michael Biehn, Kevin Smith, Robert Picardo, Julie Newmar, Lee Meriwether, Ted Raimi, Leisha Hailey, Kate Moenig, Walter Jones, Nichelle Nichols, Dominic Purcell, Cary Elwes, Dan Harmon, Rob Benedict, Richard Speight, Shannon Purser, Teddy Sears, Mike Tyson, Kel Mitchell, Marc Silvestri
October 27–29, 2017	Los Angeles Convention Center; Los Angeles, California	100,000+	Neal Adams, David Anders, Dino Andrade, Karan Ashley, Mark Bagley, Scott Bakula, Eric Basaldua, John Beatty, Chloe Bennet, Michael Biehn, Zach Callison, J. Scott Campbell, Greg Capullo, Ming Chen, Charlet Chung, Greg Cipes, Dameon Clarke, Tom Cook, Jonny Cruz, Jim Cummings, Camilla d'Errico, Felicia Day, Grey DeLisle, Shannon Eric Denton, Lar DeSouza, Michaela Dietz, Kevin Eastman, Carlos Ferro, Andy Field, David J. Fielding, Sandy Fox, Todd Haberkorn, Kyle Hebert, Chuck Huber, Grant Imahara, Walter E. Jones, Tom Kane, Walter Koenig, Phil LaMarr, Lauren Landa, Lex Lang, Ken Lashley, Jae Lee, Stan Lee, Rob Liefeld, Jim Mahfood, Darryl McDaniels, Gates McFadden, Todd McFarlane, Scott Menville, Vic Mignogna, Kirby Morrow, Daran Norris, James O'Barr, Alan Oppenheimer, Phil Ortiz, Katee Sackhoff, Keith Silverstein, Marc Silvestri, Rikki Simons, Felipe Smith, Kevin Smith, Ryan Sohmer, Austin St. John, Tara Strong, James Arnold Taylor, Veronica Taylor, Burt Ward, David Yost
October 26–28, 2018	Los Angeles Convention Center; Los Angeles, California		Robbie Amell, Karan Ashley, Michael Biehn, Kimberly Brooks, Greg Capullo, Katie Cassidy, Ming Chen, Tom Cook, Brett Dalton, Michaela Dietz, David J. Fielding, Dan Gilvezan, Walter E. Jones, Rob Liefeld, Phil Ortiz, Tim Seeley, Austin St. John, Eric Vale, and Skottie Young.
October 11–13, 2019	Los Angeles Convention Center; Los Angeles, California	123,000	
~~September 25–27, 2020;~~; ~~December 11–13, 2020~~	~~Los Angeles Convention Center~~; ~~Los Angeles, California~~		Rescheduled to December 2020 and then cancelled due to the COVID-19 pandemic
December 3–5, 2021	Los Angeles Convention Center; Los Angeles, California		
December 2–4, 2022	Los Angeles Convention Center; Los Angeles, California		Simu Liu, William Shatner, Charlie Hunnam, Giancarlo Esposito, Ming-Na Wen, Elijah Wood, Sean Astin, Laz Alonso, Tomer Capone, Karen Fukuhara, Wil Wheaton, LeVar Burton, Amy Jo Johnson, Steve Burns, Sean Schemmel, Tom Kenny, Cast of The Sandlot, Jim Cummings, Daman Mills, David Henrie, Curran Walters, Debi Derryberry, Rob Paulsen, Mark DeCarlo, Candi Milo, Carolyn Lawrence, Jeff Garcia, Megan Cavanagh, Crystal Scales, Scott Grimes, Greg Grunberg, Sonny Strait
December 1–3, 2023	Los Angeles Convention Center; Los Angeles, California		Amy Jo Johnson, Billy Boyd, Bonnie Wright, David Yost, Diana Lee Inosanto, Dominic Monaghan, Elijah Wood, Eman Esfandi, Emily Rudd, Erin Moriarty, Grace Caroline Currey, Ivanna Sakhno, James Phelps, Jamie Campbell Bower, Johnny Yong Bosch, Jon Heder, Karen Fukuhara, Lateef Crowder dos Santos, Logic, M. Shawn "Crown" Crahan, Matt Smith, Natasha Liu Bordizzo, Oliver Phelps, Paul Lieberstein, Rainn Wilson, Rodger Bumpass, Sean Astin, Tom Kenny, Virginia Gardner
October 4–6, 2024	Los Angeles Convention Center; Los Angeles, California		Amy Jo Johnson, Anjelica Huston, Brandon Rogers, Carel Struycken, Christina Ricci, Christopher Lloyd, Cristina Vee, Emily Swallow, Ewan McGregor, Giancarlo Esposito, Gordon Cormier, Harvey Guillén, Hayden Christensen, Hayden Panettiere, Jack DeSena, Jennie Kwan, Jimmy Workman, Johnny Yong Bosch, Kate Micucci, Kayvan Novak, Kristen Schaal, Lea Thompson, M. Shawn "Crown" Crahan, Michael J. Fox, Ming-Na Wen, Olivia Hack, Paul Sun-Hyung Lee, Rosario Dawson, Sting, Tara Strong, Tom Wilson, Vivien Lyra Blair, Zach Tyler Eisen
September 26–28, 2025	Los Angeles Convention Center; Los Angeles, California		Aliona Baranova, Alyson Stoner, Billie Piper, Bryce Dallas Howard, Casper Van Dien, Charlie Cox, David Arquette, David Errigo Jr., David Tennant, Denise Richards, Devora Wilde, Dina Meyer, Elden Henson, Elizabeth Olsen, Freema Agyeman, Ian Sinclair, Jake Busey, Jamie Kennedy, Jennifer English, Krysten Ritter, Maggie Robertson, Matthew Lillard, Michael Ironside, Mike Colter, Neil Newbon, Olivia Olson, Paul Bettany, Skeet Ulrich, Vincent D'Onofrio, Vincent Martella, Zachary Gordon
October 30–November 1, 2026	Los Angeles Convention Center; Los Angeles, California	TBA	Aaron Paul, Aidan Casserly, Akili D. Hight, Allen Carter, Andrew Rende, Andy Carreon, Angela Kinsey, Arden Cho, Billy West, Bob Odenkirk, Christopher Lloyd, Dean Norris, Eman Esfandi, Giancarlo Esposito, Graham McTavish, Grant O’Rourke, Hayden Christensen, Jared Sams, Ji-young Yoo, John DiMaggio, Lamorne Morris, Matt and John Yuan, Maurice LaMarche, May Hong, Natasha Liu Bordizzo, Nicolas Cage, Phil LaMarr, Rainn Wilson, Sam Heughan, Stephen Walters, Tony Hale
October 22–24, 2027	Los Angeles Convention Center; Los Angeles, California	TBA	TBA
