= Impetuous =

Impetuous may refer to:

- Impetuous Theater Group, an American theatre company
- USS Impetuous, a United States Navy patrol boat
