= Slackers (film) =

2002 film by Dewey Nicks

- Theatrical release poster
- Directed by: Dewey Nicks
- Written by: David H. Steinberg
- Produced by: Erik Feig; Neal H. Moritz
- Starring: Devon Sawa; Jason Schwartzman; James King; Jason Segel; Michael Maronna; Laura Prepon
- Cinematography: James R. Bagdonas
- Edited by: Tara Timpone
- Music by: Joey Altruda; Venus Brown; Justin Stanley
- Production companies: Screen Gems; Alliance Atlantis; Original Film; Slackers Productions
- Distributed by: Sony Pictures Releasing
- Release date: February 1, 2002
- Running time: 86 minutes
- Country: United States
- Language: English
- Budget: $14 million
- Box office: $6.4 million

Slackers is a 2002 American teen comedy film directed by Dewey Nicks in his directional debut and starring Devon Sawa, Jason Schwartzman, Jaime King, Jason Segel, Michael Maronna, and Laura Prepon. Its plot follows a nerdy college student who blackmails a group of young men with his knowledge that they have cheated throughout college, and uses it to get closer to a young woman he is obsessed with.

The film was released on February 1, 2002 and grossed $6.4 million worldwide at the box office. It mainly received negative reviews from critics.

== Plot ==
Best friends Dave Goodman, Sam Schecter, and Jeff Davis have spent almost four years at Holden University scamming their way through college. During one exam scam in their final semester, Dave meets Angela Patton and asks her out while writing his phone number on her exam sheet. Ethan Dulles (who calls himself "Cool Ethan"), a nerdy student who is obsessed with Angela, observes Dave and grows jealous. Ethan takes Angela's exam question sheet after she leaves and uses it to blackmail the guys into setting up a successful date for him with Angela. The guys set Ethan up in multiple situations to try to convince Angela to like him, while Dave tells Sam during their research that Angela is no more important to him than any other scam they have pulled. Ethan fails to attract her after frequent confrontations based on his delusional behaviour, immaturity, and flouting of social norms.

While trying to convince Angela to go out with Ethan, Dave and Angela develop a mutual attraction. After telling Ethan that he has failed to convince Angela to go out with him, Ethan reveals to Dave that he has been obsessing over Angela for quite some time. He reminds Dave that he still intends to get Dave and his friends expelled if they fail him. Angela and Dave go on an impromptu date after a study session. Ethan finds out, follows, and records them. Dave and Angela share a romantic swim and lovemaking session, which Ethan records. He shows the tape of Dave and Angela making love to Sam and Jeff to establish that Dave intends to keep Angela for himself. Sam and Jeff, unhappy with Dave's dishonesty, hand over their research on Angela. Ethan shows Angela the file, telling her that Dave and his friends were actively stalking her. Dave punches Ethan in the face, but Ethan thinks he won Angela.

After a falling-out with everyone, Dave returns to the dorm and admits to Sam and Jeff that he genuinely cares for Angela. After making amends, the guys sabotage Ethan's job interview with a law firm, and, during the final exam, Dave confesses to Angela in front of the whole class about his years-long practice of cheating. Jeff plants an answer key in Ethan's backpack while tipping off the teaching assistant proctoring the exam. The men get expelled, but Dave and Angela get back together, and Sam ends up in a relationship with Angela's roommate, Reanna Cass. Jeff falsifies their diplomas from Holden University after Angela and Reanna graduate. Ethan, miserable that he lost Angela forever and got expelled from college after it was revealed he was stalking her, continues to work his dead-end restaurant job, as he continues to pine for Angela and nurse a hatred for Dave.

== Cast ==
- Devon Sawa as Dave Goodman
- Jason Schwartzman as "Cool" Ethan Dulles
- Jaime King as Angela Patton
- Jason Segel as Sam Schecter
- Michael Maronna as Jeff Davis
- Laura Prepon as Reanna Cass
- Joe Flaherty as Mr. Don Leonard
- Leigh Taylor-Young as Valerie Patton, Angela's stepmother
- Sam Anderson as Charles Patton, Angela's father
- Jim Rash as Head T.A. Philip
- Retta as Bruna Jackson
- Cameron Diaz as herself (uncredited)
- Gina Gershon as Woman at Trendy Club (uncredited)

== Production ==
In September 1999, it was reported that Destination Films had acquired David H. Steinberg's Slackers script for $200,000 against a guaranteed $700,000 following a bidding war with Artisan Entertainment. In March 2000, it was reported that Dewey Nicks would direct Slackers. The following month, it was reported that Devon Sawa was in final negotiations to star in Slackers while negotiations were ongoing with Jason Schwartzman to co-star. Prior to release, Destination briefly retitled the film to The Best and Brightest.

== Soundtrack ==
The film has a few tracks from Handsome Boy Modeling School (Prince Paul & Dan The Automator), including "Holy Calamity" and "Rock & Roll (Could Never Hip-Hop Like This)". It has a symphonic instrumental performance of "Baba O'Riley" from The Who playing over the opening credits, as well as an A Capella performance of "The Sign" by Ace of Base (sung by a college choir) during a scene.

== Release and reception ==
=== Box office ===
Slackers opened at #11 in the box office with $2,785,283, the 11th highest-grossing opening film of the weekend, and lasted only two weeks in theaters before it closed on February 14, 2002, with a domestic total of $5,285,941 and $1,127,974 internationally, for a worldwide total of $6,413,915.

=== Critical response ===
On the review aggregator website Rotten Tomatoes, 10% of 105 critics' reviews are positive, with an average rating of 3.3/10. The website's consensus reads: "Another teen comedy with little on its mind but moving to the next gross-out gag, Slackers strains for laughs and features grating characters." Metacritic, which uses a weighted average, assigned the film a score of 12 out of 100, based on 28 critics, indicating "overwhelming dislike". A few critics described the dialogue as a positive, but not sufficiently good to warrant attention.

Philip French wrote that "Slackers makes American Pie look like The Importance of Being Earnest."

Roger Ebert of the Chicago Sun-Times awarded the film zero out of four stars and described the film as "a dirty movie. Not a sexy, erotic steamy or even smutty movie."
