= List of Salute Your Shorts episodes =

Salute Your Shorts is an American children's comedy television series that aired on Nickelodeon. The series premiered on July 4, 1991 and ran for two seasons, with the final first-run episode airing on September 12, 1992.

== Series overview ==
Season	Episodes	Originally released	
Season	Episodes	First released	Last released
Pilot	1	October 6, 1990	
1	13	July 4, 1991	October 19, 1991
2	13	June 26, 1992	September 12, 1992

== Episodes ==
=== Pilot (1990) ===
Title	Directed by	Written by	Original release date
"Welcome to Bunk 13"	Randall Miller	Steve Slavkin	October 6, 1990
The pilot episode aired October 6, 1990 as a special on Nickelodeon. After the series was picked up, the cast had to re-audition for their roles.

=== Season 1 (1991) ===
No. overall	No. in season	Title	Directed by	Written by	Original release date
1	1	"Sponge Saga"	Bryan Spicer	Story by : Steve Slavkin; Teleplay by : Bob Kushell	July 4, 1991
When Sponge calls in the correct answer to the first question of a trivia contest on the Giant Jim radio show, he becomes respected by the campers. However, this soon puts a toll on him as Jim becomes more antagonistic with the next questions. Meanwhile, Ug buys a cologne from Budnick for his date with his then-girlfriend, Rachel, hoping he'll smell good. The cologne instead turns him blue.
2	2	"First Day"	Peter Baldwin	Steve Slavkin	July 6, 1991
Michael arrives at Camp Anawanna and is humiliated by Budnick and Donkeylips by having his shorts taken away and hoisted up the flagpole.
3	3	"Ghost Story"	Jefferson Kibbee	Steve Slavkin	July 13, 1991
Budnick retells the ghost story of Zeke the Plumber and uses Donkeylips to scare the campers as a prank. However, the joke's on Budnick when he has to face up to Ug in disguise of the plumber himself.
4	4	"Telly & Dina"	Jefferson Kibbee	Steve Slavkin	July 20, 1991
When the boys get in trouble with Ug for sneaking a goat into his bunk, he punishes them by making them set up for the Indian Council Dinner. Meanwhile, Telly and Dina fight over who will be Bunk Cabin Chief. Z.Z. has the deciding vote, but it puts her in a dilemma.
5	5	"The Clinic"	Jefferson Kibbee	Steve Slavkin	July 27, 1991
Michael and Budnick fake being sick to get out of synchronized swimming lessons, but they later learn that Ug is really taking the campers to the beach, leaving the two behind. Both work together to get the ice cream, which according to the nurse is given to those with sore throats. Meanwhile, Ug and the other campers go on series of misadventures to the beach, which results in all of them getting sick.
6	6	"Dina Loves Donkey Lips"	Peter Baldwin	Steve Slavkin	August 3, 1991
Leading up to a big dance, Dina gets a secret admirer whom she hopes is Michael. Meanwhile, Michael and Sponge, co-DJs for the dance, deal with difficulties in their preparations. To Dina's horror, Donkeylips is revealed as her admirer. She learns a hard lesson about being kind to others after discovering how much she's hated in camp for her diva behavior.
7	7	"I Hate Camp"	Jefferson Kibbee	Story by : Steve Slavkin; Teleplay by : Tim Maile and Douglas Tuber	September 7, 1991
Michael is bullied by a tough kid named Thud Mackie and tries several attempts to get out of camp to stay with his parents.
8	8	"Ug's Girlfriend Is Coming"	Jefferson Kibbee	Story by : Steve Slavkin; Teleplay by : Steve Slavkin, Tim Maile and Douglas Tuber	September 14, 1991
Ug busts Budnick for trying to sneak in outside food until he gets a letter from Rachel telling him that she's coming over to see him. While the girls are teaching Ug how to be romantic for her, the boys comes across a Dear John letter informing him that she intends to break up with him. They realize the first letter was meant for her new boyfriend. Ug becomes despondent until the campers set him up with the new mail carrier, Mona.
9	9	"Cheeseburgers in Paradise"	Larry Lipton	Steve Slavkin	September 21, 1991
Budnick's latest scheme to save the campers from eating the camp food is to order the cheeseburgers from a stand not too far from camp. Meanwhile, Sponge and Donkeylips seek the help of Telly to assist them to qualify for their respective wrestling leagues.
10	10	"Z.Z. Saves the Planet"	Gino Tanasescu	Steve Slavkin	September 28, 1991
ZZ tries to host an environmental party, but it goes awry thanks to the other campers not listening. A recycling man teaches her to get them to listen by going with things they like such as a trip to a water park. This plan works well and the campers are encouraged to clean up the camp to pay for the trip. On the day, Dina and the others (except Budnick) use the money to buy a maple tree.
11	11	"Telly and the Basketball Team"	Larry Lipton	Story by : Steve Slavkin; Teleplay by : Steve Slavkin & Timothy Williams	October 5, 1991
Telly is trying to teach her team to win with hard work, but they don't want to. Instead they elect Bobby Budnick and he does the impossible to win without working. But when the other campers realize how much they hurt Telly by using another camp's plays, they resolve to work hard.
12	12	"Night at the Theatre"	Jay Dubin	Steve Slavkin & Thomas Hill	October 12, 1991
Dina develops stage fright the day the camp is hosting a Cinderella play because her crush is there. However, even after she overcomes her fright, he still doesn't acknowledge her and instead gives flowers to ZZ.
13	13	"Treasure of Sara Madre"	Larry Lipton	Story by : Steve Slavkin; Teleplay by : Steve Slavkin & Thomas Hill	October 19, 1991
Rumors abound about the treasure of the late dance teacher, Sara Madre. Budnick pranks Dina and the other campers with fake maps after they give him their stereos. They get revenge by making him and Donkeylips dig a hole in Ug's prized baseball field. The campers escape and leave Budnick to face the wrath of an angry Ug.

=== Season 2 (1992) ===
No. overall	No. in season	Title	Directed by	Written by	Original release date
14	1	"Goodbye Michael, Hello Pinsky"	Jefferson Kibbee	Steve Slavkin	June 26, 1992
Michael has to leave camp due to Chicken Pox and new camper Pinsky arrives.
15	2	"Sponge's Night Out"	Jefferson Kibbee	Story by : Steve Slavkin; Teleplay by : Tim Maile and Douglas Tuber	June 27, 1992
Pinsky organizes a double date between him and his date and Sponge with her bunkmate, Sponge's first date.
16	3	"Telly and the Tennis Match"	Jefferson Kibbee	Story by : Steve Slavkin; Teleplay by : Tim Maile and Douglas Tuber	July 4, 1992
Telly needs a new tennis racket to beat an arrogant fellow camper. Budnick gives her one, but demands a favor in return.
17	4	"Budnick and Dina in Love (Part I)"	Gino Tanasescu	Steve Slavkin	July 11, 1992
The girls hear a rumor that Budnick likes someone in their bunk. ZZ thinks it's her, but he in fact likes Dina. Meanwhile, Donkey Lips and Sponge try to earn enough merit badges to go on a camping trip.
18	5	"Budnick and Dina in Love (Part II)"	Gino Tanasescu	Steve Slavkin	July 18, 1992
Budnick and Dina begin dating, but Budnick drastically changes his personality, making Dina not like him as much.
19	6	"Citizen Pinsky"	Bryan Spicer	Tim Maile and Douglas Tuber	July 25, 1992
Pinsky helps Sponge with the camp newspaper, writing exaggerated stories and digging up dirt on the other campers.
20	7	"Capture the Flag"	Mike Finney	Steve Slavkin	August 1, 1992
Donkey Lips wants to join the camp Capture The Flag team as an attacker, and Pinsky, after seeing his tactical knowledge, attempts to help.
21	8	"Dina and the Rock Star"	Gino Tanasescu	Steve Slavkin	August 8, 1992
Dina promises that she can get famous Rock Star Jamie Mallet Jr. to perform at the annual camp dance, but she does not know him at all.
22	9	"The Man Who Would Be Ug"	Gino Tanasescu	Story by : Tim Maile and Douglas Tuber; Teleplay by : Gary Marks	August 15, 1992
Ug and Budnick make a bet that Budnick can be a better camp counselor during Backwards Week.
23	10	"The Wrath of Kahn, Jr."	Gino Tanasescu	Steve Slavkin	August 22, 1992
Dr. Kahn's undisciplined niece Ellen comes to camp, making mischief and trouble wherever she goes.
24	11	"Clan of the Cavegirls"	Gino Tanasescu	Story by : Steve Slavkin, Tim Maile and Douglas Tuber; Teleplay by : Tim Maile and Douglas Tuber	August 29, 1992
It's a hot day and every camper's tempers are at their worst, especially the girls whom are annoyed with each other and demand to move to different bunks. Meanwhile, the boys are a lot closer and takes a cursed skull from the caves. Despite Ug's warning to get rid of it to avoid the curse, they ignore it. In desperation, the girls steal back the skull and return it to the cave. However, they are stranded because of a storm. Can they spend one night together before returning to camp.
25	12	"They Call Me Ms. Tibbs"	Gino Tanasescu	Tim Maile and Douglas Tuber	September 5, 1992
Ug's girlfriend, Mona, returns as a park ranger and cites so many violations on Anawanna's part. Their fight gets more intense and the boys take advantage. When the girls, find out, they teach the boys a hard lesson they won't soon forget.
26	13	"Anawanna, Inc."	Jefferson Kibbee	Tim Maile and Douglas Tuber	September 12, 1992
The campers form a company making birdhouses, but make Donkeylips and his team do all the work, leading them to go on strike.
