= Jason Zimbler =

American actor

- Born: July 27, 1977 (age 49); New York City, New York, U.S.
- Education: University of Notre Dame (BBA; MA)
- Occupations: Actor, software designer
- Years active: 1984, 1991–1994 (actor), 2011-present (designer)
- Employer: HBO

Jason Zimbler (born July 27, 1977) is an American former actor best known for portraying Ferguson Darling on the Nickelodeon television series Clarissa Explains It All.

== Early life and education ==
Born in New York City, Zimbler graduated from the University of Notre Dame in 1998, and has both an undergraduate degree in business administration and a graduate degree in theatre directing.

In 1992, Zimbler spoke in front of the United States House of Representatives' United States House Select Committee on Children, Youth, and Families, discussing issues concerning free condom distribution in school and the images of today's heroes.

== Career ==
=== Television ===
Zimbler appeared on The Edge of Night and co-starred in the Nickelodeon television program Clarissa Explains It All from 1991 to 1994 as the character Ferguson W. Darling; The Portland Mercury's Alison Hallett opined that it is this latter role—as "the world’s brattiest little brother"—for which Zimbler is best known. In 2007, Zimbler joined other past Nickelodeon stars (Danny Cooksey, Michael Maronna, and Marc Summers) in the music video for The XYZ Affair's "All My Friends".

=== Theatre ===
Zimbler played Robert Anderson in the 1989 revival of Shenandoah. Since then he has directed and assisted theatre productions in New York City, including frequent participation with the Impetuous Theater Group. Zimbler received the 2006 Stage Directors and Choreographers Society's Observership for Burleigh Grime$, and was chosen to take part in the 2007 Lincoln Center for the Performing Arts' Director's Lab. Additionally, the director has been an educator and theatre program head at Buck's Rock Performing and Creative Arts Camp for eight years.

In late 2007, Jason Zimbler and Sam Kusnetz founded the theatre company The Re-Theatre Instrument in Portland, Oregon. Under Zimbler's direction, The Re-Theatre Instrument has re-imagined such classic works as Faust, King Lear and Much Ado About Nothing.

== After acting ==
As of 2011, Zimbler is employed by HBO as a software designer.
