= Dewey Nicks =

American photographer and film director

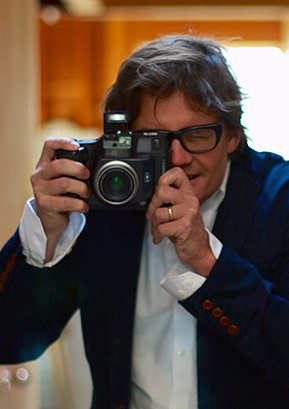
Dewey Nicks

George Dewey Nicks III is an American photographer and film director.

== Biography ==
Nicks was born in St. Louis, Missouri. Nicks studied photography at the Art Center College of Design in Pasadena, California. Immediately after graduation, he launched into a professional career as a fashion and commercial photographer—now-spanning three decades—with work appearing in such magazines as Vogue, the New York Times Magazine, and GQ among many others. Nicks has also created classic advertising images for such clients as Nike, Tommy Hilfiger, Levis, and Ralph Lauren.

Soon after expanding into commercial directing, he won the U.S. Comedy Arts Festival Award for “The World’s Funniest Commercial” and became a Director's Guild nominee for Outstanding Directorial Achievement in Commercials. His documentary Hell House had its New York debut at the Museum of Modern Art. Nicks’ first book of photography Kustom, was inspired by some of the very ideals and unique expression that originally attracted him to California. Car culture, plastic surgery, and energetic excess were the subjects of his book, Kustom (printed in 2000 by Greybull Press).

In 2018 Nicks unearthed a box filled with thousands of Polaroids from his 1990s photo sessions. Enigmatic snapshots of woman posed and unposed, primed for the camera or caught unaware—these Polaroids reveal the comfort and ease between Nicks and his subjects. He shared them with his frequent collaborator, book designer and publisher Tom Adler. The resulting volume, Polaroids of Women, contains just over 100 of their favorite images from the collection and features an insightful foreword by the designer and preservationist Brad Dunning.

He also directed Slackers, which was released in 2002. In the same year, he also directed the music video for the Incubus' single "Are You In?", using the historic restaurant Perino's as a shooting location.
