= The Night Train to Kathmandu =

- Home video release cover
- Written by: Ian Robert; Robert Wiemer
- Directed by: Robert Wiemer
- Starring: Milla Jovovich; Eddie Castrodad; Pernell Roberts
- Music by: Paul Baillargeon
- Country of origin: United States
- Original language: English

Production
- Executive producers: Robert Wiemer; Ned Kandel
- Producer: Glenn Kershaw
- Cinematography: Glenn Kershaw
- Editors: James Eaton; Stephanie Lowry
- Running time: 102 minutes
- Production company: Golden Tiger Pictures

Original release
- Network: The Disney Channel
- Release: June 5, 1988

The Night Train to Kathmandu is a 1988 American romantic fantasy television film starring Milla Jovovich, Eddie Castrodad, and Pernell Roberts. It was directed by Robert Wiemer.

== Plot summary ==
Lily is forced to leave her home in Princeton, New Jersey with her parents and brother to travel to Nepal. She is unhappy that she had to leave her own country and her old life behind to visit this mystic country with her family. Once there, however, she meets a mysterious Sherpa named Joharv and falls in love with him and the country. Joharv leads Lily as well as her brother and her anthropologist father to search for the legendary invisible "City That Never Was" against the backdrop of the Himalayas.

== Main cast ==
- Milla Jovovich as Lily McLeod
- Eddie Castrodad as Prince Joharv
- Pernell Roberts as Prof. Harry Hadley-Smithe
- Kavi Raz as Prof. Dewan Godbothe
- Trevor Eyster (credited as Tim Eyster) as Andrew McLeod
- Robert Stoeckle as Jeff McLeod
- Jan Pessano as Maureen McLeod
- Santosh Panta as Ravi

== Home media ==
The film has been released on VHS and digital formats.
