= Parallels (Star Trek: The Next Generation) =

Seventh-season Worf-centric episode

- Star Trek: The Next Generation episode
- Episode no.: Season 7 Episode 11
- Directed by: Robert Wiemer
- Written by: Brannon Braga
- Original air date: November 29, 1993

Guest appearances
- Wil Wheaton as Wesley Crusher; Patti Yasutake as Alyssa Ogawa; Mark Bramhall as Gul Nador; Majel Barrett as Computer Voice

Episode chronology
| ← Previous "Inheritance" | Next → "The Pegasus" |
- Star Trek: The Next Generation season 7

"Parallels" is the 11th episode of the seventh season of the American science fiction television series Star Trek: The Next Generation, the 163rd overall. It was originally released on November 29, 1993, in broadcast syndication. The episode was written by Brannon Braga, and directed by Robert Wiemer. Executive producer Jeri Taylor wrote its final scene, but was uncredited.

Set in the 24th century, the series follows the adventures of the crew of the USS Enterprise (NCC-1701-D). In this episode, Lt. Worf (Michael Dorn) returns from a bat'leth tournament and slowly discovers that he is being moved across parallel universes. The crew of an alternative Enterprise realises what is happening and seeks to return him to his own reality, but, after an attack by a Bajoran ship, a space-time fissure explodes, causing hundreds of thousands of alternative versions of the Enterprise to enter the same universe.

Braga intended to focus the "Parallels" on Jean-Luc Picard (Patrick Stewart), but this was changed to Worf in order to make the differences more obvious across the timelines, as Braga worried that Picard's relationships could not significantly differ across near-universes. The producers were concerned with the confusing nature of the initial proposal, but felt that further changes greatly improved it. Wil Wheaton appeared as Wesley Crusher, replacing the initial plan to include Tasha Yar, after Braga was concerned about copying "Yesterday's Enterprise". "Parallels" received Nielsen ratings of 12.8 percent, one of the highest for the season, but some fans were upset at a Worf/Deanna Troi romance. Critics responded favorably, with praise for both Dorn and Marina Sirtis.

== Plot ==
After a bat'leth tournament, Lieutenant Worf returns to the Enterprise and a surprise birthday party. He starts noticing subtle changes; the flavor of the cake changes, and a painting given to him by Data appears on a different wall. The changes become more pronounced; as a Cardassian vessel attacks the Enterprise, unfamiliar controls result in Worf failing to raise the shields, leading to the death of Geordi La Forge. Despite retaining his memories, Worf has no evidence that reality has changed, and his logs support the stories given by the other crew members. Other major changes occur: Riker is captain of the Enterprise in a reality wherein Picard was killed by the Borg, the Bajorans became the oppressors of the Cardassians and enemies of the Federation, Wesley Crusher is a lieutenant on the Enterprise, and Worf is married to Deanna Troi.

The crew find that Worf's RNA has an unusual quantum signature; he is from a different universe. The crew theorizes that Worf, during his return from the bat'leth tournament, passed through a time-space fissure; the shuttlecraft's engines and later proximity to La Forge's VISOR caused Worf to shift between universes. Each universe covers a different possibility; anything that could happen has done so in a parallel universe, hence the changes in the reality that Worf is experiencing. The Enterprise returns to the location of the fissure, attempting to return Worf to his original universe, but is attacked by a Bajoran ship, which causes the fissure to destabilize and the various realities to merge. Innumerable Enterprises begin appearing at an exponential rate.

Data determines that the only way to restore the realities is to send Worf via shuttlecraft to the Enterprise of his universe, passing through the fissure and using the shuttlecraft's engines to reseal it. Locating the correct ship, Worf begins travelling back but is attacked by an Enterprise from a Borg-overrun universe, its crew refusing to return. The Enterprise that he left fires upon the ship, accidentally destroying it. Worf passes through the fissure, returning to his universe with a single Enterprise in front of him. Worf finds that no time has passed since he initially entered the fissure. Expecting a surprise party, he finds only Troi waiting to give him a present and, knowing that the two are married in many alternate universes, he invites her to share dinner with him.

== Production ==
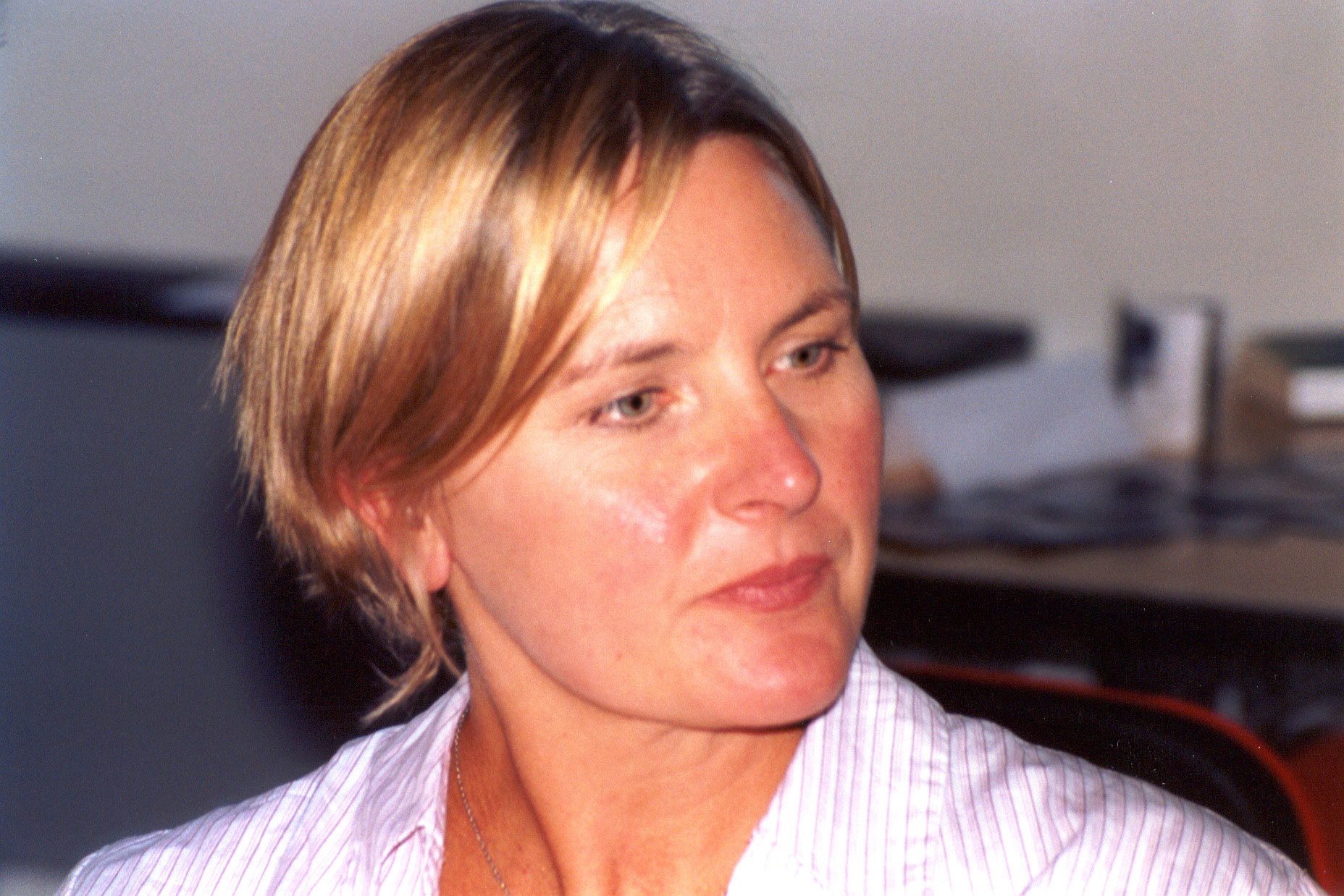
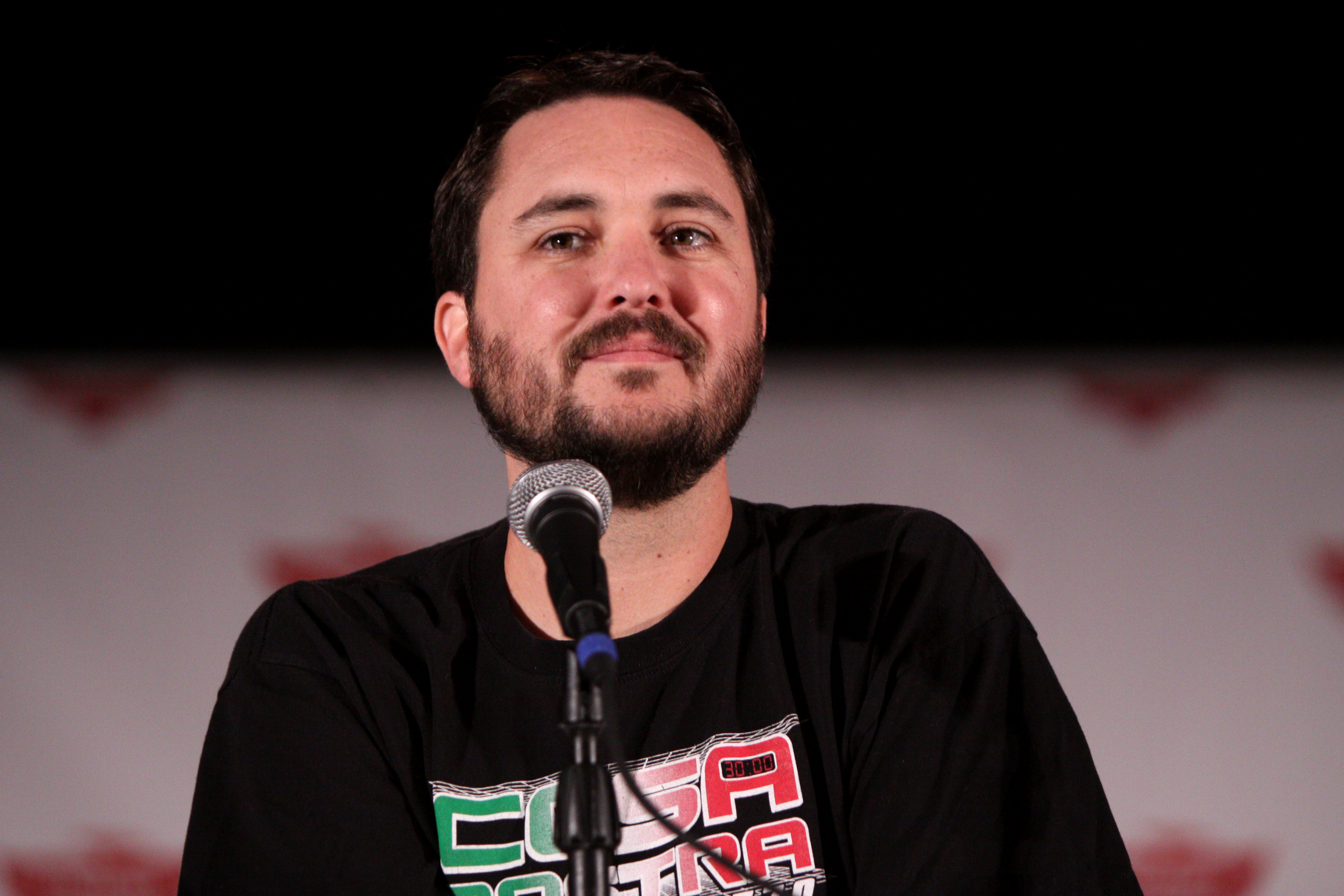
Brannon Braga originally thought to bring back Denise Crosby (left, 2003) as Tasha Yar, but replaced her with Wil Wheaton (right, 2011) as Wesley Crusher.

Writer Brannon Braga initially conceived of the episode as centered on Captain Picard, rather than Worf. It was only when planning out the story that he realised that there would not be a great deal of personal differences across realities with Picard. As such, he decided to include Worf as the main character, and chose to place him in a romance with Troi as he felt that most people would not have expected it. Braga considered writing Tasha Yar into the episode, but he felt that this would have copied "Yesterday's Enterprise", so he replaced her with Wesley Crusher, played by Wil Wheaton. Further changes were made to the script as Braga had intended for Worf to be sung "Happy Birthday to You" in the Klingon language, but the cost for the rights to the song would have been prohibitive and so the idea was dropped.

Executive producer Jeri Taylor approved the initial outline but was concerned that it might be potentially confusing. She was happy with the outcome and described it as having "worked like gangbusters". She felt that the Worf/Troi romance had been subtly played by the writers on the show since the fifth season episode "Ethics" and had been an ambition on the show since "A Fistful of Datas" in the sixth season. After being included in "Parallels", the relationship was featured several times during the final season of The Next Generation. Michael Piller was not enthused with the initial idea, but Taylor felt that the means by which it evolved saved it.

Braga thought in hindsight that Crusher's appearance could have been explained more but at the time he felt it was most intriguing if he was "just there". He also wanted to avoid suggesting that Worf was going insane, since that theme had been covered in the previous season in the episode "Frame of Mind". Director Robert Wiemer sought to have a conclusive ending to the episode to state Worf's future intentions. Worf's suggestion of champagne to Troi was written by Taylor to accommodate this.

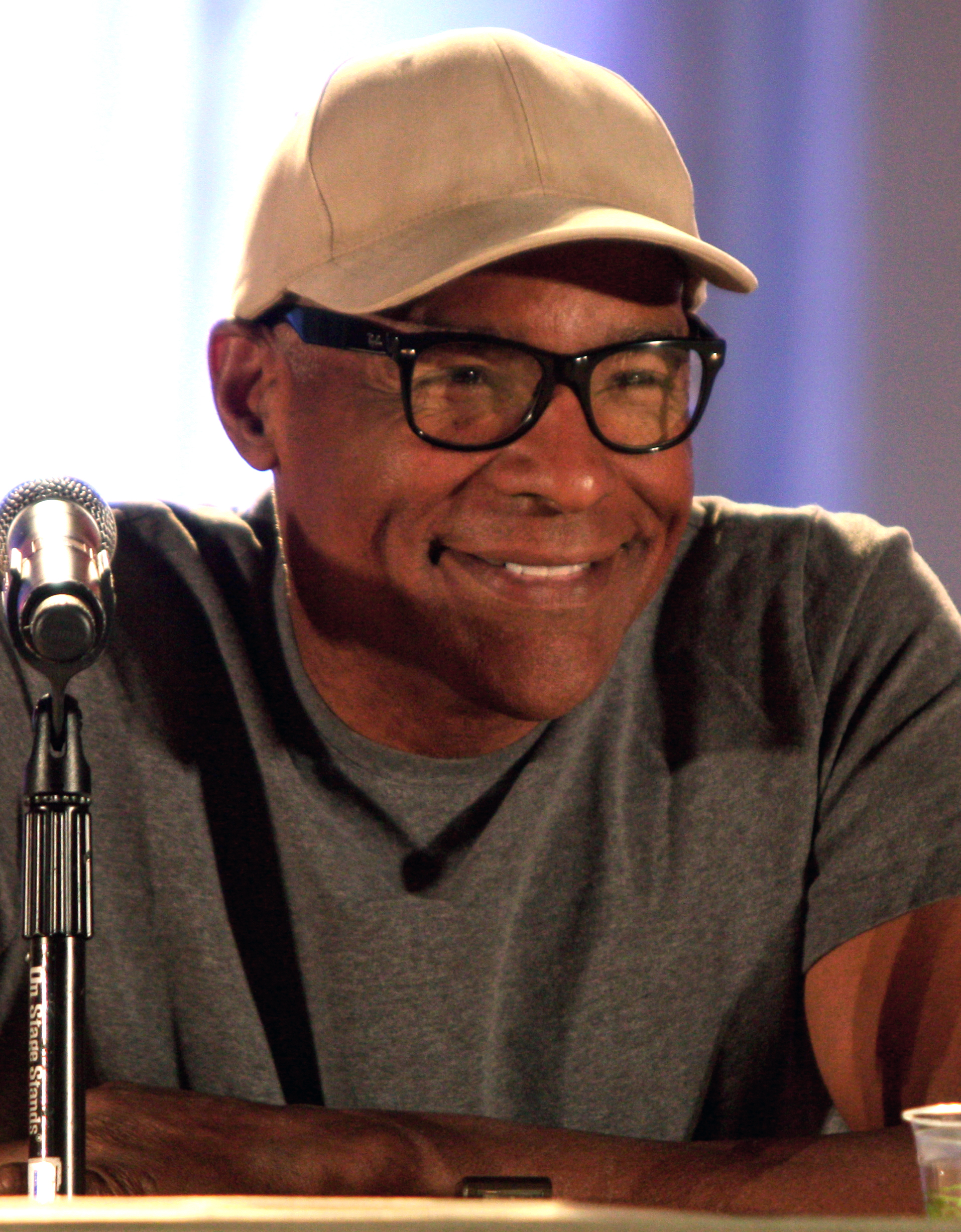
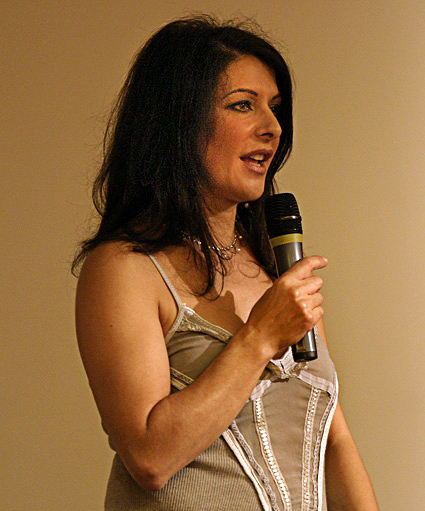
"Parallels" was the basis for romance between Worf played by Michael Dorn (left, 2012) and Deanna Troi played by Marina Sirtis (right, 2005) during the seventh season.

"Parallels" re-used a number of previously seen props and costumes, including Troi's entire uniform wardrobe with the exception of the first season outfits. Other elements such as the Argus Array (a space station model) had appeared in other episodes, and alternative comm badges used in the episode had been seen in "Future Imperfect". The space station Deep Space 5 was a re-dress of Regula One from Star Trek II: The Wrath of Khan. Modifications were made to the bridge set in one reality; these would later be re-used for the future Enterprise in the series finale "All Good Things...". The effect shot with multiple copies of the Enterprise was achieved by photographing the same model from multiple angles, resulting in more than 100 appearing on screen. The scene with multiple Worfs was produced through the use of split screens and stand-ins.

This simultaneous portrayal of numerous different universes was cited by Roberto Orci, one of the screenwriters for the 2009 film Star Trek, as proof that, despite the movie's creation of a secondary timeline, the "regular" Trek universe was unaffected and everything from The Original Series onward still went on as it had before. He said that "Parallels" was using the many-worlds interpretation of quantum mechanics in which a new timeline does not overwrite a previous one, unlike previous episodes in the franchise such as "The City on the Edge of Forever" and "Yesterday's Enterprise".

== Themes ==
The multiverse idea featured in "Parallels" has been discussed by commentators. Theoretical physicist Lawrence M. Krauss praised the episode for the inclusion of the idea in his book The Physics of Star Trek, although added that it incorrectly explained measurement in quantum mechanics. This quantum mechanics theory explained during the episode was called "a little sketchy" by Michelle and Duncan Barrett in their book Star Trek: The Human Factor. They based this on mathematical physicist Roger Penrose's theory that there is no identified physics for bridging the gap between physics and quantum physics. The Barretts noted the use that the Star Trek franchise has made of the idea of the multiverse and different timelines.

== Reception ==
The episode aired during the week commencing November 27, 1993, in broadcast syndication. According to Nielsen Media Research, it received ratings of 12.8 percent. This means that it was watched by 12.8 percent of all households watching television during its timeslot. This placed it as the second most watched syndicated show for that week, and it was the fourth most viewed episode of the season behind part two of "Descent", "Eye of the Beholder" and "All Good Things...". Some fans were upset at the introduction of a romance between Worf and Troi, as they felt that Riker and Troi was the correct pairing. Taylor said that some of the fans felt that the Riker/Troi relationship was so inevitable that the show simply should have "got it over with" and not introduced a new romance for Troi instead.

Zack Handlen, in his review for The A.V. Club, gave the episode a grade of A−. He said that it was a "nicely balanced" episode, and that Sirtis and Dorn had good chemistry. Handlen further praised Dorn's comic timing. He enjoyed the image of the other versions of the Enterprise appearing in the same universe, but criticised the level of technobabble during the second half of the episode. IGN writer Scott Colura released a podcast asking whether "Parallels" was the most underrated episode of the series.

Keith DeCandido gave the episode a rating of 10 out of 10 in his review for Tor.com. He expressed his love for the episode, praising the centering of "Parallels" on Worf "partly because no one does frustrated befuddlement better than Michael Dorn". He enjoyed the increasing changes to each universe, but his highlight of the episode was the Enterprise from the Borg invasion timeline which fired on the shuttle at the end. DeCandido said that this kept the episode memorable after 19 years, and "cemented this as one of TNG's top episodes".

In 2015, The Hollywood Reporter noted this episode's scene with a frightened Riker from the Borg universe wanting to stay, as one of the top ten "most stunning" moments of Star Trek: The Next Generation. In 2017, it was rated as the 9th best time travel episode in Star Trek. In May 2019, The Hollywood Reporter ranked "Parallels" among the top twenty-five episodes of Star Trek: The Next Generation. In a list of the top 100 episodes of the Star Trek franchise, "Parallels" was placed in 84th place by Charlie Jane Anders at io9. In 2017, Popular Mechanics said that "Parallels "was one of the top ten most fun episodes of Star Trek: The Next Generation.

== Home media release ==
The first release on home media for "Parallels" within the United States was on VHS cassette as part of a single episode release, which took place on January 1, 2000. "Parallels" was released on DVD in 2002 as part of the season box set. It was later released as part of the season set on Blu-ray within the United States on December 2, 2014. This included an audio commentary from Braga.

== See also ==
- "Mirror, Mirror" from the original Star Trek series, the first Mirror Universe episode in the Star Trek franchise
- Alternate history
- Many worlds
