= Tim Clawson =

American film producer

- Born: February 9, 1960 (age 66); United States
- Occupations: Producer, studio executive, screenwriter

Tim Clawson (born 1960) is an American film and television producer, film studio executive, and screenwriter.

Clawson is best known as the screenwriter of the film They Call Me Bruce? and the executive in charge of production on such films as Scream 4, Piranha 3-D, The Reader, and Inglourious Basterds, as well as television shows including Salute Your Shorts.

In August 2012, he was hired as vice-president of New Regency in charge of physical production. As of 2021, he was a production manager at Amazon Studios.
