= The Final Days (2000 film) =

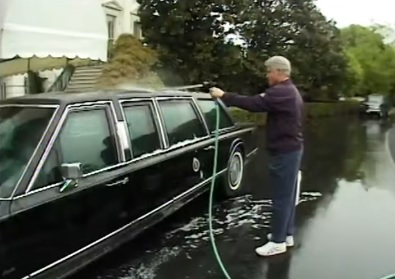
- Bill Clinton is shown washing the presidential state car in a scene from The Final Days.
- Directed by: Philip Rosenthal
- Produced by: Peter Hutchins
- Starring: Bill Clinton; Kevin Spacey; Mike Maronna
- Release dates: April 29, 2000 (Washington, D.C.)
- Running time: 6 minutes
- Country: United States
- Language: English
- Budget: $12,000

The Final Days is a humorous short film produced by the White House to screen at the White House Correspondents' Association annual dinner in April 2000. It stars then-President of the United States Bill Clinton as himself. The film was designed by officials of the outgoing Clinton administration to neutralize media portrayals of Bill Clinton as a "lame duck" president by exaggerating that narrative to the point of absurdity.

== Plot ==
The Final Days is a comedic look at Clinton's last days in the White House as he approached lame duck status. In it, he is shown "roaming the halls of an empty White House like a lost 222-pound [100 kg] puppy in search of a purpose".

== Production ==
=== Development ===
The idea for the film came from Clinton's joke writer Mark Katz who had observed that a dominant media narrative in the late days of the 2000 election was that the incumbent president, whose wife was campaigning for U.S. Senate while national attention was focused on the presidential contest between Al Gore and George W. Bush, was "increasingly being depicted as the lonely guy minding the store". The film was intended to subvert that narrative by establishing ownership of it. In a 2007 analysis of rhetorical humor in American political communication, Michael Andrew Phillips-Anderson argued that the film satirized, not Clinton, but rather the media who had suggested the president had advanced to lame duck status. By showing Clinton involved in mundane tasks that would be extraordinary for a U.S. president to undertake, such as answering the White House switchboard and practicing origami, the film served to erode such assertions by highlighting their absurdity.

The full film.

=== Filming ===
The Final Days was filmed in and around the White House. Ultimately, several sequences shot by director Philip Rosenthal were not incorporated into the film, including one showing a crossword puzzle-playing Clinton phoning Vladimir Putin on the Moscow–Washington hotline (also known as the "red phone") to ask "what's a five-letter word for 'tasty Russian pancake'?"

The film's production was financed by the Democratic Party.

== Cast ==
The Final Days starred Bill Clinton as himself, with cameo appearances by a number of journalists and U.S. government officials, including: Helen Thomas, Madeleine Albright, Sam Donaldson, and Al Gore. Kevin Spacey also makes a brief appearance, as himself, retrieving the Academy Award he won at that year's Oscars for Best Actor (in the film American Beauty) from Clinton. Commercial actor Mike Maronna plays the character "Stuart", a fictional White House staff member.

== Release ==
The film's debuted at the White House Correspondents' Dinner held at the Washington Hilton on April 29, 2000.

== Reception ==
The Final Days was well received by those attending the dinner. It was downloaded more than 200,000 times in the week following its debut, described by Entertainment Weekly as having gone "viral". (Note: Streaming video services had not been widely adopted by 2000, meaning most viewers had to download the film in its entirety in order to watch it.)

Some criticized the film, however. Susan Silver, a staff writer for The Mary Tyler Moore Show and The Bob Newhart Show, predicted that, as a result of the film's success, future presidents would be judged by voters on their ability to deliver a "laugh riot" rather than on substantive policy positions.

== See also ==
- Presidency of Bill Clinton
