= Robert Wiemer =

American film director

Robert Wiemer (January 30, 1938 - August 21, 2014) was a film and television director, writer, producer and editor.

== Director ==
- Star Trek: Deep Space Nine
  - episode "Profit and Loss"
- SeaQuest DSV
- Star Trek: The Next Generation
  - episodes "Data's Day", "Interface", "Lessons", "Masks", "Parallels", "Schisms", "Violations", "Who Watches the Watchers"
- Superboy
- The Night Train to Kathmandu (1988)
- Anna to the Infinite Power (1983)
- Somewhere, Tomorrow (1983)
- Letters (1975)
- The Big Blue Marble

== Writer ==
- The Night Train to Kathmandu (1988)
- Anna to the Infinite Power (1983)
- Somewhere, Tomorrow (1983)
- The Big Blue Marble

== Producer ==
- The Night Train to Kathmandu (1988) (executive producer)
- Anna to the Infinite Power (1983)
- Somewhere, Tomorrow (1983)
- The Big Blue Marble (executive producer)

== Editor ==
- Letters (1975)
