= The XYZ Affair (band) =

Indie rock musical group

- Origin: Brooklyn, New York, United States
- Genres: Indie rock
- Years active: 2002–2009
- Label: Independent
- Past members: Alex Feder; Chris Bonner; Russ Maschmeyer; Sam Rockwell
- Website: www.thexyzaffair.com

The XYZ Affair was an American indie rock band from Brooklyn, New York.

== Description ==
The band consisted of Alex Feder (guitar, vocals), Chris Bonner (bass), Russ Maschmeyer (guitar, keyboards), and Sam Rockwell (drums) who met while attending New York University. Their name comes from the 1797 diplomatic episode known as the XYZ Affair.

During the summer of 2007 the band filmed their first music video for "All My Friends" featuring former Nickelodeon TV personalities Marc Summers, Danny Cooksey, Michael Maronna and Jason Zimbler. On July 24, 2007, the band was voted "band of the day" on Spin.com.

== Members ==
- Alex Feder – guitar, vocals
- Chris Bonner – bass
- Russ Maschmeyer – guitar, keyboards
- Sam Rockwell – drums

== Discography ==
- Good To Know (But Hard To Tell) (EP) (2003)
- A Few More Published Studies (2006)
- Trials (Digi EP) (2008)
