= Kirk Baily =

American actor (1963–2022)

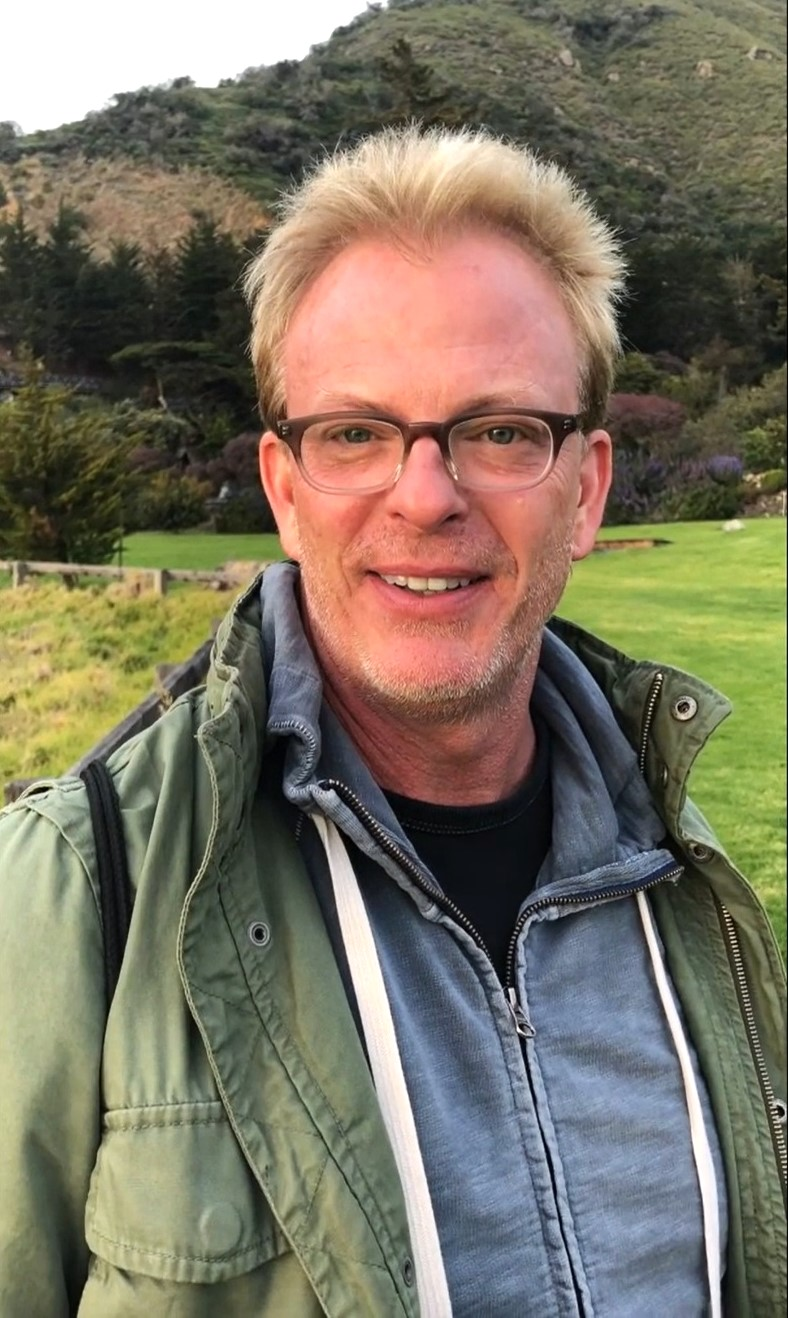
- Born: Kirk William Baily; February 2, 1963; Adrian, Michigan, U.S.
- Died: February 28, 2022 (aged 59); Los Angeles, California, U.S.
- Other name: Bo Williams
- Education: Miami University
- Occupation: Actor
- Years active: 1972–2022
- Spouse: Peggy Ziegler (m. 1993; div. 2019)
- Partner: Ranjani Brow
- Children: 2

Kirk Baily (February 2, 1963 – February 28, 2022) was an American actor.

He was best known for his role as Kevin "Ug" Lee on the Nickelodeon sitcom Salute Your Shorts, and later for his voice acting roles in animation and video games.

== Early life ==
Baily was born in Adrian, Michigan on February 2, 1963.

His father Harold Baily was a Navy veteran from Adrian, and his mother Barbara Baily (née Moats) a teacher from Ney, Ohio.

Baily cited Abbott and Costello, Dick Van Dyke, The Three Stooges and Tim Conway as early creative influences since he and his four brothers enjoyed watching them on television.

== Education ==
He graduated from Adrian High School in 1981, where he was a baseball player and swimmer.

Baily graduated from the Theatre program at Miami University in 1985 after starring in their production of The Front Page that same year. He was a member of Ohio Lambda, Miami University's Phi Kappa Psi fraternity.

He moved to New York after college to further study theatre. After moving to Los Angeles in 1991 to pursue acting full-time, he performed with The Groundlings and The Second City while working as an acting coach and high school drama teacher.

== Career ==
And then there was my favorite, Ug. Kirk Baily is the actor who played him and was just a perfect guy to have on set. The guy would throw himself into anything. There wasn't a single thing he couldn't do. He had a rubber face, kind of a young Don Knotts. He was just perfect. He would get stung by bees, throw himself in the lake, get knocked over backwards. The character believed he was the ultimate power at summer camp and he found out that that was not the truth and that the kids truly had the power.

— Steve Slavkin, Salute Your Shorts

Baily starred as camp counselor Kevin "Ug" Lee on the popular Nickelodeon sitcom Salute Your Shorts from 1991 to 1992.

He had a recurring role as Greg Madigen during the final season of Melrose Place in 1999.

Baily found success as a voice actor, starring as Tetsuya Kajiwara in Fushigi Yûgi, Millions Knives in Trigun, and Shin in Cowboy Bebop. He also worked doing ADR looping for film and television.

== Personal life ==
Baily ruptured his left ear drum after diving into Franklin Canyon Lake while filming the Salute Your Shorts episode "Ug's Girlfriend is Coming" in 1991, causing permanent hearing loss.

He was married to Peggy Ziegler from 1993 until their divorce in 2019. They had two children, Bella Clare and Bowen.

Baily and Michael Ray Bower were groomsmen for the wedding of their former Salute Your Shorts castmate Danny Cooksey in 1998.

He is survived by his partner – actress Ranjani Brow – and his two children.

=== Death ===
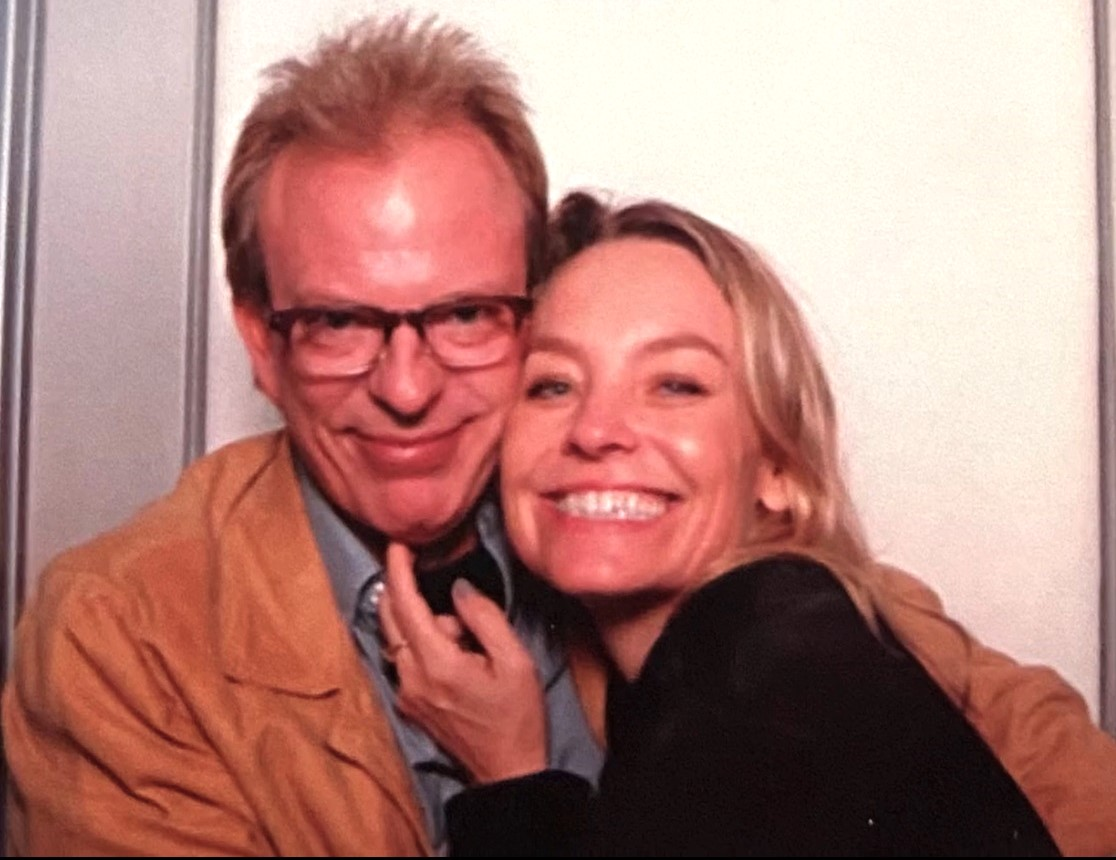
Baily and Ranjani Brow

Baily became sick, tested positive for lung cancer in August 2021, but stated he would continue to do dubbing projects as long as he was able to. He died in Los Angeles from heart failure caused by the disease on February 28, 2022, 26 days after his 59th birthday.

Paws of Fury: The Legend of Hank and DC League of Super-Pets were his final projects and both were dedicated in his memory.

Sam Roberts memorialized Baily on the March 2, 2022, episode of Sam Roberts Now.

A celebration of life was held for Baily in Pasadena, California, on May 21, 2022.

== Filmography ==
=== Live-action ===
List of acting performances in film and television
Year	Title	Role	Notes	Source
1989	Alexa	Tony		
1990	Lifestories	Philip Richardson	Episode: "Steve Burdick"	
1991	Voodoo Dawn	Kevin		
1991	Absolute Strangers	Arnie	Television film	
1991–92	Salute Your Shorts	Kevin "Ug" Lee	26 episodes	
1993	Caroline at Midnight	Detective #2		
1994	Greyhounds	Billy Bruno	Television film	
1994	Silk Stalkings	Gary Holden	Episode: "Maid Service"; uncredited	
1994	Models Inc.	Barry	Episode: "In Models We Trust"	
1995	Houseguest	Stuart the Manager		
1995	Sisters	The Creep	Episode: "100"	
1995	Black Day Blue Night	Mayor's Assistant		
1996	Beverly Hills, 90210	Tony Spencer	Episode: "Coming Out, Getting Out, Going Out"; credited as Kirk Bailey	
1997	The Larry Sanders Show	Ed	Episode: "Pain Equals Funny"	
1997	The 6th Man	Coach Nichols		
1997	Back in Business	Yuppie		
1997	Pacific Blue	Mike Grant	Episode: "Matters of the Heart"	
1998	3 Ninjas: High Noon at Mega Mountain	Carl		
1998	7th Heaven	Joe James	Episode: "Time to Leave the Nest"	
1998	Indiscreet	Larry Neal	Television film	
1998	Outside Ozona	Agent Tony Cole		
1999	Melrose Place	Greg Madigan	3 episodes	
1999	Soccer Dog: The Movie	Ref		
1999	Star Trek: Voyager	Magnus Hansen	Episode: "Dark Frontier"	
2000	Rocket's Red Glare	Mr. Matthews	Television film	
2001	Judging Amy	Harry Winter	Episode: "Between the Wanting and the Getting"	
2001	FreakyLinks	Officer Scott Hanover	Episode: "Subject: Police Siren"	
2001	Felicity	Financial Aid Officer	2 episodes; credited as Kirk Bailey	
2002	NYPD Blue	Roger Simmons	Episode: "Humpty Dumpty"	
2004	Life on Liberty Street	ER Intern	Television film	
2008	Bottle Shock	Loan Officer		
2008	Nobel Son	Wil Cavalere		
2011	Five	Scott	Television film	
2015	The3Tails Movie: A Mermaid Adventure	Head Coast Guard		

=== Voice ===
==== Anime ====
List of voice performances in anime
Year	Title	Role	Notes	Source
1998	Fushigi Yûgi: Memories First OAV	Tetsuya Kajiwara	Credited as Bo Williams	
1998	Fushigi Yûgi: The Mysterious Play - Reflections OAV 2	Tetsuya Kajiwara	Credited as Bo Williams	
1999	Fist of the North Star	Gibara	Episode: "Tremble & Die! - Villains of Night Fog Valley!"; credited as Bo Williams	
1999	Mobile Suit Gundam	Cpt. Garma Zabi	Credited as Bo Williams	
1999	Mobile Suit Gundam II: Soldiers of Sorrow	Cpt. Garma Zabi	Credited as Bo Williams	
1999	Mobile Suit Gundam 0083: Stardust Memory	Pilot of Bloom's Shuttle		
1999	Dual! Paralle lunlun monogatari	United Team Alliance	3 episodes; credited as Bo Williams	
1999	Cowboy Bebop	Shin	2 episodes; credited as Bo Williams	
2001	Mobile Suit Gundam: The 08th MS Team	Fed Gossiper / Unit 2	Credited as Bo Williams	
2001	Gate Keepers	Train Passenger	Credited as Bo Williams	
2001	Hand Maid May	Raffle Ticket Man	Credited as Bo Williams	
2001	Ah! My Goddess: The Movie	Additional Voices	Credited as Bo Williams	
2001	Vampire Princess Miyu	Father	Episode: "Reiha Has Come"	
2001	Metropolis	Marduk / Scientist		
2001	Saint Tail	Crook 2	Episode: "Legend of Happiness?! The Clock Tower Commotion"	
2002	Armitage III: Dual Matrix	Robot Security Guard / Unit Dispatcher		
2002	Carried by the Wind: Tsukikage Ran	Beninosuke / Junai Yoshikawa	13 episodes	
2002	.hack//Liminality Vol. 1: In the Case of Mai Minase	Masaya Makino		
2002	Fushigi Yûgi: The Mysterious Play - Eikoden	Tetsuya Kajiwara	4 episodes; credited as Bo Williams	
2003	Trigun	Millions Knives (Adult)	8 episodes; credited as Bo Williams	
2003	Rurouni Kenshin	Reisui	Episode: "The Magic of Feng Shui"; credited as Bo Williams	
2003	Cowboy Bebop: The Movie	Robber D		
2003	Android Kikaider: The Animation	Ichiro Komyoji	Episode: "Kodoku na Ningyô"	
2003	.hack//Liminality Vol. 4: Trismegitstus	Masaya Makino		
2004	Yukikaze	Press Reporter #2		
2004–06	Ghost in the Shell: Stand Alone Complex	Yamaguchi / Kawashima	13 episodes	
2005	Rescue Me Mave-Chan	Classmate 1		
2011	From Up on Poppy Hill	Additional Voices		

==== Film ====
List of voice performances in feature films
Year	Title	Role	Notes	Source
1992	Twin Dragons	Voice	English dub	
2002	Asterix & Obelix: Mission Cleopatra	Additional Voices	English dub	
2003	Kill Bill: Volume 1	Additional Voices		
2004	Shaolin Soccer	Additional Voices	English dub	
2004	Shark Tale	ADR Group		
2006	Over the Hedge	Additional Voices		
2006	Open Season	Additional Voices		
2008	Dead Space: Downfall	Walla	Direct-to-video	
2008	The Tale of Despereaux	Additional Voices		
2010	Vampires Suck	Voice Actor		
2010	Buried	411 Male Operator		
2010	Yogi Bear	Additional Voiceover		
2011	Open Season 3	Additional Voices		
2011	Rango	ADR Group		
2011	Hoodwinked Too! Hood vs. Evil	Voice		
2011	Spy Kids: All the Time in the World	Voice		
2011	The Smurfs: A Christmas Carol	Additional Voices	Short film	
2012	Chronicle	Additional Voices		
2012	ParaNorman	Blithe Hollow Townperson		
2012	Hotel Transylvania	Additional Voices		
2013	Frozen	Additional Voices		
2014	Feast	Additional Characters	Short film	
2014	Big Hero 6	Additional Voices		
2015	My All American	Additional Voices		
2017	The Boss Baby	ADR Group		
2017	The Star	Additional Voices		
2018	The Meg	Voice		
2018	Bumblebee	Brawn / Decepticon Soldier		
2019	Missing Link	New Worlder		
2020	The SpongeBob Movie: Sponge on the Run	Additional Voices		
2022	Paws of Fury: The Legend of Hank	Additional Voices	Dedicated to his memory; released posthumously	
2022	DC League of Super-Pets	Additional Voices	Dedicated to his memory; released posthumously	

==== Video games ====
List of voice performances in video games
Year	Title	Role	Notes	Source
2000	Galerians	Birdman / Dr. Pascale	Credited as Bo Williams	
2000	Star Trek: Voyager – Elite Force	Crewman Mitch Cstalos / Malon	Credited as Kirk Bailey	
2003	.hack//Infection	Additional Voices		
2003	.hack//Mutation	Additional Voices		
2003	.hack//Outbreak	Additional Voices		
2004	.hack//Quarantine	Additional Voices		
2004	Shadow Hearts: Covenant	Hien	Credited as Bo Williams	
2008	Condemned 2: Bloodshot	Thieves / Vagrants / Rioters	Credited as Kirk Bailey	
