= Heidi Lucas =

American actress (born 1977)

Heidi Lucas (born Heidi Ann Lukacsik June 3, 1977) is an American attorney and actress.

== Biography ==
During the early 1990s, Lucas played Dina Alexander on Nickelodeon's Salute Your Shorts, which ran from 1991 to 1992. In 1992, she appeared in the 'Fantasy Dating Game' Girls' Club. Created for the Philips CD-I Imagination Machine, it allowed girls to go on interactive dates with thirty of the 'coolest guys in the universe'. In 1993, she won the Young Artist Award for best young actress to co-star in a cable series for her role. She also played Noriko "Max" Matsuda in the 1996 sci-fi series Hypernauts.

By 1998, Lucas quit acting, pursuing higher education instead. She currently lives in Arizona and works as an attorney. In 2015, she reunited with most of her Salute Your Shorts cast at Portland, Oregon's Everything is Festival.

== Filmography ==
=== Television ===
| Year | Title | Role | Network | Notes |
|---|---|---|---|---|
| 1991–1992 | Salute Your Shorts | Dina Alexander | Nickelodeon | Series regular, 26 episodes |
| 1992 | Nick Arcade | Herself | Nickelodeon | Salute Your Shorts Celebrity Special |
| 1993 | Getting By | Marlene | ABC | episode "Not with My Sister" |
| 1995 | Boy Meets World | Kim | ABC | episode "Danger Boy" |
| 1995 | Saved by the Bell: The New Class | Nicole Miller | NBC | episode "Thomas D." |
| 1996 | Hypernauts | Noriko 'Max' Matsuda | ABC | 11 episodes |
| 1996 | The Wayans Bros. | Toni Jackson | The WB | episode "Mama, I Wanna Act" |

Lucas appeared in numerous video shorts as well as in the 1992 film Ghost Ship. She also appeared in major commercials for the following companies:

- Coca-Cola (1998)
- Clearasil (1997)
- Sunny Delight (1996)
- Noxzema (1995 & 1996)
- Secret Ultra Dry Deodorant
- Johnson & Johnson Persa Gel
- Skittles
