= Trevor Eyster =

American actor (born 1978)

- Born: Timothy Richard Eyster; October 10, 1978 (age 47); Tarzana, California, U.S.
- Other names: Tim Eyster
- Occupations: Actor, social activist
- Years active: 1985–1998; 2013–present
- Known for: "Sponge" on Salute Your Shorts

Trevor Eyster (born October 10, 1978), formerly known as Tim Eyster, is an American actor. He is best known for his role as Eugene "Sponge" Harris on the television program Salute Your Shorts, which aired from 1991 to 1992 on Nickelodeon. The role garnered him a Young Artist Award nomination for "Best Young Actor Co-Starring in a Cable Series".

== Early life ==
Eyster was born Timothy Richard Eyster on October 10, 1978, in Tarzana, California, and grew up in Chatsworth and Dana Point, California. He attended Dana Hills High School, and became an emancipated minor in 1996. In 2002, he legally changed his first name to Trevor.

== Career ==
Eyster began his career at the age of 9, on an episode of the soap opera Santa Barbara in 1987. He thereafter appeared in a number of television episodes, two TV films, and two feature films through 1992. As a voice actor he also performed in Disney's 25-minute animated featurette The Prince and the Pauper (1990). In 1991, he played Ray Krebbs' son Jock in the Dallas series finale "Conundrum".

His best-known role as a child actor was starring in the role of Eugene "Sponge" Harris on the two-season Nickelodeon television series Salute Your Shorts (1991–1992). In 1992 he was nominated for a Young Artist Award for "Best Young Actor Co-Starring in a Cable Series" for the role. Since 2010 Eyster has appeared in various reunion gatherings of the show's stars.

After the Salute Your Shorts series was discontinued in 1992, except for a role in an episode of Babylon 5 in 1998, Eyster took a 21-year break from screen acting, resuming in 2013 as an adult actor after changing his first name from Tim to Trevor. As an adult he has appeared in a number of short films, done small roles in television series and TV films, and starred in his own self-produced docudrama series.

== Activism ==
In 2011, Eyster founded the non-profit organization "...and then, Angels descended", an empathy-driven, micro-volunteering organization which seeks to bridge the empathy deficit. His organization was granted 501(c)(3) status by the IRS in 2012. The organization pairs volunteer "angels" with those who reach out for help through the organization's website.

In 2016, he created the docudrama miniseries SpongeyLeaks after he discovered his disabled aunt was being abused by her state-paid In-Home Supportive Services (IHSS) caregiver. The series documents the events that happened after Eyster discovered the abuse and neglect that was occurring, and also examines the issue of elder abuse and dependent adult abuse. The SpongeyLeaks webisode series premiered December 19, 2016. In January 2017, Eyster appeared on The Dee Armstrong Show to discuss elder abuse and disabled-adult abuse.

== Major filmography ==
=== Television ===
Year	Title	Role	Director	Network	Notes
1987	Santa Barbara	Ethan Dobson		NBC	1 episode (uncredited)
1988	The Night Train to Kathmandu	Andrew McLeod	Robert Wiemer	Disney Channel Premiere Films	Made for TV movie
1988	Family Ties	Young Alex P. Keaton	Sam Weisman	NBC	"Heartstrings: Part 3"
1989	Hard Time on Planet Earth	Jonathan Newcomb	Michael Lange	CBS	"Losing Control"
1989	Paradise	Jeff Brandt	Robert Scheerer	CBS	"A Matter of Honor"
1989	Shivers	Matthew	Peter Baldwin	CBS	CBS Summer Playhouse
1989	Married... with Children	Franklin	Gerry Cohen	FOX	"It's a Bundyful Life" Parts 1 & 2
1990	The Dreamer of Oz: The L. Frank Baum Story	Frank Joslyn Baum	Jack Bender	Bedrock Productions	Made for TV movie
1991	Dallas	Jock Krebbs	Leonard Katzman	CBS	"Conundrum"
1991–1992	Salute Your Shorts	Eugene "Sponge" Harris	various	Nickelodeon	Series regular, 26 episodes
1998	Babylon 5	Simon	Janet Greek	PTEN	"No Compromises"
2014	Bones	Wesley Foster	David Boreanaz	FOX	"The Recluse in the Recliner"
2016–2017	SpongeyLeaks	Himself	Trevor Eyster	via webisodes	Self-produced docudrama series

=== Film ===
Year	Title	Role	Director	Producer	Notes
1990	Prayer of the Rollerboys	Little Boy	Rick King	Robert Mickelson	
1990	The Prince and the Pauper	Kid #1	George Scribner	Walt Disney Pictures	25-minute animated featurette
1991	Alligator II: The Mutation	J.J. Hodges	Jon Hess	Golden Hawk Entertainment	
