= Impetuous Theater Group =

Impetuous Theater Group

Impetuous Theater Group is a Manhattan based Indie Theater company founded in 2004 by James David Jackson, Josh Sherman and Joe Powell. The mission of the group is to produce new work in New York City with emerging artists through ensemble, creation of family, and education.

In 2005, the group became a resident theater company of Center Stage, NY . Shortly after that, Impetuous Theater Group was named People of the Year 2005 by Martin Denton of The New York Theatre Experience .

Past productions have included The American Premiere of Venezuela, The New York Premiere of A Night Near The Sun and The World Premiere of Fenway: Last of the Bohemians. Impetuous Theater Group's World Premiere of Office Sonata was eventually published in Plays and Playwrights 2007 . Their 47:59 Play Festival: Writing in Rotation is noted as changing the face of The 24 Hour Plays formulae .
