= Michael C. Maronna =

American actor

Michael Maronna
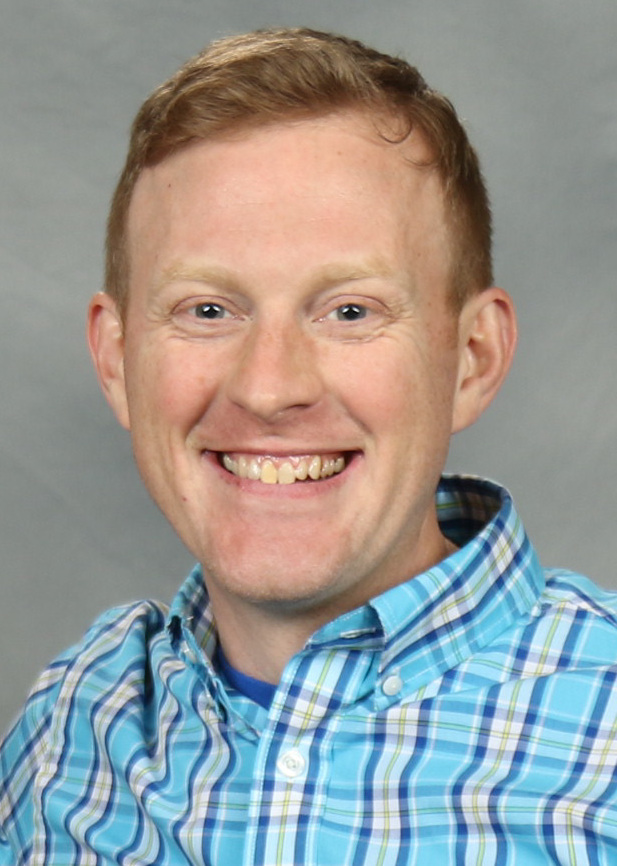
- Maronna in 2016
- Born: New York City, U.S.
- Occupations: Actor; electrician
- Years active: 1989–present
- Children: 2

Michael C. Maronna is an American actor, who has appeared in several television programs and films. He is best known for his roles as "Big Pete" Wrigley on the television series The Adventures of Pete & Pete and as Jeff McCallister, Kevin's rude older brother, in the films Home Alone (1990) and Home Alone 2: Lost in New York (1992).

== Early life and education ==
Maronna was born in Brooklyn, New York, to a firefighter father and a guidance counselor mother. He is of one half Italian, three-eighths Irish, and one-eighth Dutch descent. He was the first grandchild in a big family, which included one younger brother and sister. As a teenager, he went to Hunter College High School in New York City, before attending Purchase College of the State University of New York, where he studied documentary/nonfiction filmmaking.

== Career ==
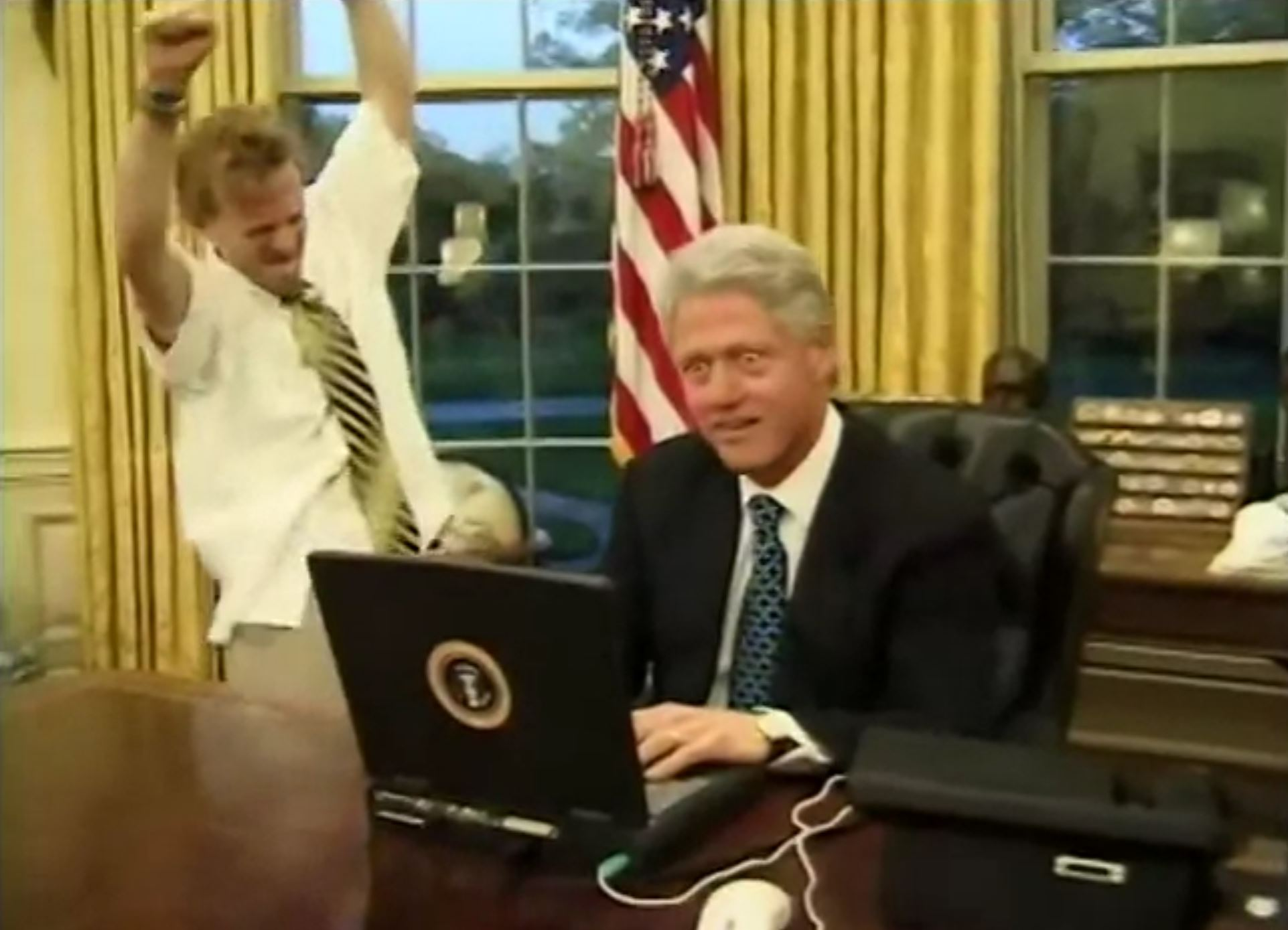
Maronna and Bill Clinton in The Final Days

Maronna appeared in his first commercial at a very young age, and it was for a Scott Paper advertisement. He played older Pete Wrigley in the television show The Adventures of Pete & Pete on Nickelodeon (from 1989 to 1996), as well as the character of Jeff McCallister in the movie Home Alone (1990) and Home Alone 2: Lost in New York (1992), when he was 13 and 15 respectively. In the first one he says the line "Kevin, you are such a disease!", which became widely popular. He also portrayed a teenage killer in an episode of Law & Order.

Maronna was in a widely seen series of 1999 ads for TD Ameritrade as Stuart, a slacker employee of a clueless boss whom he helps get on the internet with over-the-top zealousness. Maronna reprised the role in a comedy reel with Bill Clinton, which was shown at Clinton's final appearance as the President of the United States at the 2000 White House Correspondents' Association dinner.

In the 2000s, Maronna appeared in the movies Slackers and 40 Days and 40 Nights. Other credits include roles in Sex and the City and Be Kind Rewind.

He also appeared in music videos for the 2007 Nada Surf song "Whose Authority" and The XYZ Affair's "All My Friends".

Maronna's stepped away from acting in 2013, and since then he has worked as an electrician on films and television in New York. He co-hosts the podcast The Adventures of Danny and Mike with his Adventures of Pete and Pete co-star Danny Tamberelli. He has resumed acting in the 2020s.

== Filmography ==
=== Film ===
Year	Title	Role	Notes
1990	Home Alone	Jeff McCallister	Film debut
1992	Home Alone 2: Lost in New York	Jeff McCallister	
1998	Le New Yorker	Ami de Kareen	
2000	Expired	Trevor	Short film
2000	The Final Days	Stuart	Short film
2002	Slackers	Jeff Davis	
2002	40 Days and 40 Nights	Bagel Guy	
2003	What Alice Found	Alice's Boyfriend	
2004	Men Without Jobs	E-Man	
2010	On Edge	FBI Agent	Short film
2024	I Saw the TV Glow	Neighbor #1	

=== Television ===
Year	Title	Role	Notes
1989–1996	The Adventures of Pete & Pete	Big Pete Wrigley	
1994	The Weinerville New Year's Special: Lost in the Big Apple	Undisclosed Role	TV special
1997	Law & Order	Dale Kershaw	Episode: "Thrill"
2003	Gilmore Girls	Leon	Episode: "Here Comes the Son"
2004	Bad Apple	Videographer	TV film
