= A New Start (Arrested Development) =

- Arrested Development episode
- Episode no.: Season 4 Episode 5
- Directed by: Mitchell Hurwitz; Troy Miller
- Written by: Dean Lorey; Jim Vallely
- Cinematography by: Peter Lyons Collister
- Editing by: Kabir Akhtar; A.J. Dickerson
- Production code: 4AJD07
- Original air date: May 26, 2013
- Running time: 28 minutes

Guest appearances
- Henry Winkler as Barry Zuckerkorn; John Beard as himself; Ed Helms as James Carr; Maria Bamford as Debrie Bardeaux; Chris Diamantopoulos as Marky Bark; Liza Minnelli as Lucille Austero; Jay Johnston as Officer Taylor; Jerry Minor as Officer Carter; Ian Roberts as Literal Doctor

Episode chronology
← Previous "The B. Team"	Next → "Double Crossers"
- Arrested Development season 4

"A New Start" is the fifth episode of the fourth season of the American television satirical sitcom Arrested Development. It is the 58th overall episode of the series, and was written by co-executive producer Dean Lorey and executive producer Jim Vallely, and directed by series creator Mitchell Hurwitz and executive producer Troy Miller. It originally released on May 26, 2013 with the rest of the season, and was distributed by Netflix.

The series, narrated by Ron Howard, follows the Bluths, a formerly wealthy, dysfunctional family, who made their money from property development. The Bluth family consists of Michael, his adopted sister Lindsay, his older brother Gob, his younger brother Buster, their mother Lucille and father George Sr., as well as Michael's son George-Michael, and Lindsay and her husband Tobias' daughter Maeby. Each episode of the season follows a different character, with this episode focusing on Tobias and his romance with Debrie Bardeaux.

== Plot ==
Tobias (David Cross), dressed in a Thing costume, drives to reconnect with Maeby (Alia Shawkat) at Sudden Valley. However, the house he intends to meet Maeby at has been rented out by a show called To Entrap a Local Predator, which aims to catch sexual predators, hosted by John Beard (played by himself). Five years earlier, after Lindsay (Portia de Rossi) tells Tobias that she believes their marriage isn't working out, (Note: As seen in "Indian Takers".) Tobias finds Lindsay's copy of Eat, Pray, Love and books a trip to India that Lindsay is also going on, unbeknownst to him. To mark his new start on life, he buys a custom license plate that reads "ANUSTART". On the plane to India, Tobias unknowingly sits behind Lindsay's seat. In India, he accidentally picks up Lindsay's luggage bag that is identical to his and gets hit by a bus. Tobias is rushed to the hospital, where he is treated by the Literal Doctor (Ian Roberts) for two weeks. Tobias flies back to the United States, where he is once again seated behind Lindsay. At Balboa Towers, Tobias announces to the family that he is going to return to acting. Lindsay and Tobias purchase a new house, and Tobias asks the realtor, James Carr (Ed Helms), to be his manager.

Tobias sneaks onto a studio lot, where he hands out his headshots to extras. After months of no work, Tobias is finally deterred after James dies. Tobias and Lindsay go to what they think is a method acting class, but is actually a methadone clinic. Tobias becomes infatuated with DeBrie Bardeaux (Maria Bamford), who had played Sue Storm in a Fantastic Four film that was never theatrically released. After Lindsay, Tobias, Marky Bark (Chris Diamantopoulos), and DeBrie have lunch together at a restaurant, Tobias and DeBrie bond over their respective partners' lack of respect for them. DeBrie compliments Tobias, and he leans in and kisses her. After DeBrie finds out that Tobias's ANUSTART license plate shares the same name as a softcore porn film she starred in, she suggests they run away together. After consuming a large amount of butter, DeBrie collapses from a heart attack, and Tobias rushes her to a hospital. Unaware that Lindsay had planned to leave Tobias for Marky Bark, Tobias calls Lindsay and tells her that he is running away with DeBrie. Tobias misses Lucille's (Jessica Walter) trial, instead looking after DeBrie in the hospital. DeBrie is revealed to have tested positive to a large amount of diseases, but Tobias refuses to leave her.

Tobias takes to the streets, dressing DeBrie up as Sue Storm and charging people for taking photos with her. They fail to get any customers, so Tobias decides to dress up as Johnny Storm. Still failing to get customers, Tobias instead decides to dress up as the Thing. Tobias and DeBrie are subsequently served with a cease and desist, but they continue dressing up, now going by generic knock-offs of their respective characters. A boy and a man approach the pair, who refer to them as the Thing and the Invisible Woman. Tobias initially uses the knock-off names, but after being offered $10, refers to him and DeBrie as the Thing and the Invisible Woman. The boy and the man turn out to be undercover police, and arrest Tobias and DeBrie. Later, Tobias and DeBrie are released from prison and start living in a motel. Tobias visits Balboa Towers, where he rescues Lucille Austero (Liza Minnelli) from being attacked by an ostrich. Lucille 2, grateful for Tobias' help, offers him a job, but declines the offer to be with DeBrie. DeBrie is upset by this and leaves Tobias. Later, Tobias is served with another cease and desist for claiming to be the Thing. With nowhere to go, Tobias drives to Sudden Valley to meet Maeby.

=== On the next Arrested Development... ===
On the next To Entrap a Local Predator, John Beard confronts Tobias about his intention to meet Maeby. John Beard tells Tobias he is free to go, but Tobias declines. After being told there is a raccoon on the patio, however, Tobias leaves and is arrested by the police.

== Production ==
"A New Start" was directed by series creator Mitchell Hurwitz and executive producer Troy Miller, and written by co-executive producer Dean Lorey and executive producer Jim Vallely. It was Hurwitz and Miller's fifth directing credits, Lorey's third writing credit and Vallely's 18th writing credit.

The season's format is different compared to previous seasons, as each of the 15 episodes focus on one individual character, with every episode happening at the same time within the show's universe, showing the character's activities since the conclusion of the third season. "A New Start" was the seventh episode of the season to be filmed, and the first of two focusing on Tobias.

== Reception ==
Eric Goldman of IGN gave the episode an 8 out of 10, saying "While it was sort of fun to learn Tobias was in India with Lindsay and unwittingly had several encounters with her, it also didn’t feel all that inspired." The Guardian's Hadley Freeman called the episode "The best episode yet!" Freeman then stated that "The plotlines are starting to come together ... Pieces are falling into place." Noel Murray and Erik Adams of The A.V. Club gave the episode a "B+" grade. Murray stated that "“A New Start” sports a wealth of top-notch Tobias slapstick and double-entendres" and Adams called the episode "an experiment with a greater degree of success" than "Double Crossers". Chris Longo of Den of Geek gave the episode five stars out of five, praising David Cross's performance, saying he "delivered." In 2019, Brian Tallerico from Vulture ranked the episode 64th out of the whole series, saying how "the character-specific episodes of season four don’t really work with [Tobias] front and center"
