= Arrested Development season 4 =

Season of television series

Arrested Development
- Season 4
- Promotional poster
- Starring: Jason Bateman; Portia de Rossi; Will Arnett; Michael Cera; Alia Shawkat; Tony Hale; David Cross; Jeffrey Tambor; Jessica Walter
- No. of episodes: 15 (original release); 22 (recut)

Release
- Original network: Netflix
- Original release: Original: May 26, 2013; Recut: May 3, 2018

Season chronology
- ← Previous; Season 3 Next → Season 5

The fourth season of the American television satirical sitcom series Arrested Development premiered on Netflix on May 26, 2013, and consists of 15 episodes. It serves as a revival to the series after it was canceled by Fox in 2006.

The storyline centers on the Bluth family, a formerly wealthy, habitually dysfunctional family, and the show incorporates hand-held camera work, narration, archival photos, and historical footage.

Unlike other seasons, each episode of the fourth season occurs over approximately the same stretch of time, but focuses on a different character. Information on events depicted in a given episode is often partial and filled in by later episodes. In 2018, a recut version of the season was released, titled Season 4 Remix: Fateful Consequences. In contrast to the original cut, it presented the events in chronological order.

== Production ==
=== Original release ===
Six years after the series was canceled by Fox, filming for a revived fourth season began on August 7, 2012. The season consists of 15 new episodes, all debuting at the same time on Netflix on May 26, 2013, in the United States, Canada, the United Kingdom, Ireland, Latin America, and the Nordics. Several actors who had recurring roles in the original series returned to reprise their roles, including Henry Winkler as Barry Zuckerkorn, Mae Whitman as Ann Veal, Ben Stiller as Tony Wonder, Scott Baio as Bob Loblaw, Judy Greer as Kitty Sanchez, and Liza Minnelli as Lucille Austero, while new characters are played by John Slattery, Terry Crews and Isla Fisher. The plot of the season focuses on the fictional production of a film based on the Bluth family scandal and what the characters have been doing since 2006. There were plans to have George Clooney make a cameo appearance for a joke centered on Mitt Romney but it never came together. This plot line ended up being revisited, without Clooney, in the fifth season.

The season's format is different compared to previous seasons, as each of the 15 episodes focus on one individual character, with every episode happening at the same time within the show's universe, showing the character's activities since the conclusion of the third season. According to Jason Bateman, "If I'm driving down the street in my episode and Gob's going down the sidewalk on his Segway, you could stop my episode, go into his episode, and follow him and see where he's going". Part of the reason for this format was the challenge with getting the cast together to shoot on the same dates. "We shot for Netflix and of course everybody was busy, so everybody had a different shooting schedule. I did scenes with light stands with an X in tape put on them. I would have a conversation with Jeffrey Tambor, then I would turn to my right and have a conversation with Jessica Walters, but both of them were light stands instead," said Henry Winkler in a November 2017 interview with Uproxx.

Michael Cera joined the writing crew for season 4 as a consulting producer, the first cast member to do so, though he did not write any episodes. Netflix CEO Reed Hastings and creator Mitchell Hurwitz previously stated that season four would be the final season of the show, and that the revival serves as a "one-off" and "act one of a movie". However, a Netflix spokesperson later went on to say, "We're hopeful there will be more seasons" and "...by no means is this the end of it. We're definitely planning to do more with them."

=== Remix: Fateful Consequences ===
In October 2014, Hurwitz said that a re-edit of season 4 was being done to tell the story in chronological order. Ron Howard recorded voice-over material for the recut. On May 1, 2018, Hurwitz announced via Twitter that the chronological re-edit would be released on May 4, 2018. The recut is titled Arrested Development Season 4 Remix: Fateful Consequences, and Hurwitz stated that it will "shuffle the content from 15 individualized stories into 22 interwoven stories the length of the original series."

Following the remixed release on Netflix, several of the cast members, including Jason Bateman, Will Arnett, Michael Cera and David Cross, requested additional compensation for the re-edited season, which they state includes unused footage shot for the original format of the season's episodes. Representatives for the actors also considered that the re-edited version made it a potential vehicle for syndication that would lead to financial gain for 20th Century Fox Television but not for the actors. According to these representatives, Fox had stated that they have the right to re-edit the episodes as they saw fit without consulting the actors. The studio later agreed to pay the actors for the additional seven episodes based on their original season 4 salaries.

== Cast ==
=== Main ===
- Jason Bateman as Michael Bluth
- Portia de Rossi as Lindsay Bluth Fünke
- Will Arnett as Gob Bluth
- Michael Cera as George-Michael Bluth
- Alia Shawkat as Maeby Fünke
- Tony Hale as Buster Bluth
- David Cross as Tobias Fünke
- Jeffrey Tambor as George Bluth Sr. / Oscar Bluth
- Jessica Walter as Lucille Bluth
- Ron Howard as Narrator / himself

=== Returning guest cast ===
- Scott Baio as Bob Loblaw
- John Beard as himself
- Ed Begley, Jr. as Stan Sitwell
- Jim Cramer as himself
- Jeff Garlin as Mort Meyers
- B.W. Gonzalez as Lupe
- Brian Grazer as himself
- Judy Greer as Kitty Sanchez
- Stacey Grenrock-Woods as Trisha Thoon
- Ed Helms as James Carr
- Clint Howard as Johnny Bark
- Jay Johnston as Officer Taylor
- Justin Lee as Annyong
- James Lipton as Warden Stefan Gentles
- Liza Minnelli as Lucille Austero
- Jerry Minor as Officer Carter
- Martin Mull as Gene Parmesan
- Andy Richter as himself/Rocky Richter-Wang/Emmett Richter/Donny Richter
- Ian Roberts as Literal Doctor
- Ione Skye as Mrs. Veal
- Ben Stiller as Tony Wonder
- Christine Taylor as Sally Sitwell
- Alan Tudyk as Pastor Veal
- Justin Grant Wade as Steve Holt
- J.J. Wall as Uncle Paul Veal
- Carl Weathers as himself
- Mae Whitman as Ann Veal
- Henry Winkler as Barry Zuckerkorn
- Mather Zickel as Studio executive

=== New guest cast ===
- Daniel Amerman as Mark Cherry
- Blake Anderson as B. Lake
- Diedrich Bader as Gunner
- Maria Bamford as Debrie Bardeaux
- Trace Beaulieu as Crow T. Robot
- Garcelle Beauvais as Ophelia Love
- Beck Bennett as 'Straight' Straightbait Actor
- Alan Blumenfeld as Floyd the Barber
- Kyle Bornheimer as Shannon Ryan
- Andy Buckley as Colonel Grimm
- Laurel Coppock as Maggie
- Terry Crews as Herbert Love
- Amanda de Cadenet as Beatrix Hebberly-Sneed, WeeBBC2 reporter
- Adam DeVine as Starsky
- Chris Diamantopoulos as Marky Bark
- Isla Fisher as Rebel Alley
- Nelson Franklin as Dr. Tilive
- Erik Griffin as Jaspar
- Chad Hall as 'Gay' Straightbait Actor
- Dan Harmon as Yurt Clerk
- David Henrie as himself
- Amy Hill as Mrs. Noh
- Joel Hodgson as Joel Robinson
- Anders Holm as Supervisor Spoon
- Brian Huskey as Chorizo salesman
- Marc Evan Jackson as Storage Auctioneer
- Peter Jason as Storage Dave / Mr. Jordan
- Bernie Kopell as Judge Kornzucker
- John Krasinski as Jerry Bruckheimer Films executive (uncredited)
- Bobby Lee as Mrs. Oh
- Natasha Leggero as News Anchor Jackie
- Rizwan Manji as Animesh
- Karen Maruyama as China Garden
- Bruce McCulloch as Father Marsala
- Debra Mooney as Joan Bark
- Noah Munck as himself
- Richard Jin Namkung as Paul "P-Hound" Huan
- Conan O'Brien as himself
- Lennon Parham as Rehab Nurse
- Eddie Pepitone as Govennah
- Busy Philipps as News anchor Joan
- Mary Lynn Rajskub as Heartfire
- Seth Rogen as Young George Bluth
- Lonny Ross as Jonah/Lonny Feinberg
- Keri Russell as Widow Carr (voice only)
- Wyatt Russell as Oakwood
- Ben Schwartz as John Beard Jr.
- John Slattery as Dr. Norman
- Maria Thayer as Tracey Bluth
- Becky Thyre as Loretta
- Tommy Tune as Argyle Austero
- Eli Vargas as Perfecto Telles
- Nadine Velazquez as Rosalita
- Allan Wasserman as Herb Zuckerkorn
- George Watsky as Chris Kazmierczak
- Suzanne Whang as Olive Garden
- Kristen Wiig as Young Lucille Bluth
- Max Winkler as Young Barry Zuckerkorn
- Zach Woods as Trippler
- John Yuan as Doug Fleer
- Matthew Yuan as Dean Fleer

== Marketing and promotion ==
Entertainment Weekly cover featuring the reunion of the entire cast.

In October 2012, Netflix chief content officer Ted Sarandos premiered footage from the fourth season for the attendees of TheWrap's annual conference TheGrill. The clip featured Buster Bluth (Tony Hale) helping his mother Lucille Bluth (Jessica Walter) smoke a cigarette, because the ankle-bracelet monitor she is wearing under house arrest prevents her from leaving her hotel room. Following that, a set photo was released showing the Bluth company stair car, now having the Austero-Bluth Company logo referencing to Liza Minnelli's character, Lucille Austero, having more stake in the company. Set photos showing Tony Hale as Buster Bluth saluting at someone's funeral were released online. The first promotional images of the entire cast together were released in the October 12, 2012, issue of Entertainment Weekly magazine. These included a cover picture, along with two pictures of the entire cast in restoration-era outfits. The first official teaser poster for the new season was released on April 4, 2013, on the show's Facebook page, along with the announcement that the 15-episode season would premiere on Netflix on May 26, 2013. Netflix released the first trailer for the fourth season online on May 12, 2013.

In March 2013, series executive producer and narrator Ron Howard stated that "We're still hoping to build to a movie and in a lot of ways, getting the Bluth family on people's radar, in a kind of contemporary way, so we can move forward with it as a movie". He stated that the film had not yet been green-lit, saying, "It's not a happening thing, but it's something that is being discussed". The same month, Hurwitz stated that he was "confident that we will succeed at [making the film]", saying "there is a bigger story out there that does exist" for the film.

== Episodes ==
=== Original release (2013) ===
No. overall	No. in season	Title	Featured character	Directed by	Written by	Original release date	Prod. code
54	1	"Flight of the Phoenix"	Michael	Mitchell Hurwitz and Troy Miller	Mitchell Hurwitz	May 26, 2013	4AJD01
After severing his ties with the majority of the family, Michael Bluth finds himself in economic turmoil after completing the Sudden Valley housing development under his new company, only to face the 2007 housing bubble which results in Sudden Valley turning into a secluded ghost town. After unsuccessfully attempting to receive a loan from Lucille Austero, the primary shareholder in what is now the Austero-Bluth Company who is running for a congressional seat, Michael moves in with his son George Michael in his dorm at the UC Irvine, while himself enrolling in University of Phoenix. George Michael is working with his other roommate Paul on 'Fakeblock' software, which George Michael explains is a privacy software, and is uncomfortable with Michael's presence. When Michael's scheme to kick Paul out of the dorm fails, George Michael, Paul, and a visiting Maeby vote Michael out of the dorm, with meticulous planning on Michael's part resulting in himself receiving a unanimous vote. A disappointed and confused Michael goes to the airport, where he attempts to buy an in-flight magazine that features an article about him, and is forced to buy a plane ticket. He is later saddened when he finds out the article portrays him as a failed businessman. He returns home to Newport Beach, planning to take up residence in his mother's vacant apartment, and is surprised to find the apartment has been trashed. He is then attacked by an ostrich.
55	2	"Borderline Personalities"	George Sr.	Mitchell Hurwitz and Troy Miller	Jim Vallely & Richard Rosenstock	May 26, 2013	4AJD03
Shortly after the events of the third season, George Sr. has begun a spiritual "Sweat & Squeeze" business venture at the border of California and Mexico with his twin brother Oscar, where he bilks money from businessmen by having Oscar take the businessmen into a sweat lodge for an hour, then switches places with George Sr. so he can charge the businessmen upwards of $10,000 for a small cup of lemonade. However, George Sr. is mainly using the property to prevent the land from going into the possession of Stan Sitwell, who George and Lucille discover is trying to build a wall on the U.S. border for the government to keep out Mexican immigrants (an idea that had originally been Lucille's but that Sitwell has stolen), despite George originally mistaking it for a monument to George W. Bush. Subsequently, George Sr. continues to lie to his brother by telling Oscar that he is using the property entirely for the business venture. In order to build the wall, George Sr. and Lucille must separate their assets so they decide to fake a divorce while secretly rekindling their sexual relations. Eventually, Oscar learns the truth from Barry Zuckerkorn, who mistakes him for George Sr, and gets revenge on his brother by sleeping with Lucille while George Sr. learns he will have to bribe the right-wing politician Herbert Love, Lucille Austero's congressional opponent, to support construction of the wall.
56	3	"Indian Takers"	Lindsay	Mitchell Hurwitz and Troy Miller	Caroline Williams & Dean Lorey	May 26, 2013	4AJD05
At the harbormaster's lounge after the boat party, Lindsay Bluth breaks off her marriage with her husband Tobias. After reading the "pray" section of Eat, Pray, Love, Lindsay is inspired to go on a spiritual trip to India, which devolves mostly into shopping for counterfeit goods. Eventually she runs out of money and decides to return, retaining advice from a shaman that told her "love is where you left it". Taking that as advice to reconcile with Tobias, she decides to try harder at their marriage and agrees to be a character witness at Lucille's trial in order to pay for a new house for them, which is a lavish mansion after meeting with a predatory realtor. Because of her increasing difficulty with the outlandish script that Lucille has written about being a good mother, Lindsay agrees to go to a method acting class with Tobias. Due to a misunderstanding, this ends up being a methadone clinic. On a double date with two patients from the clinic, Lindsay falls for activist Marky Bark and runs off with him. After a whirlwind night of dancing and mediocre sex, in which she breaks up with Tobias, Lindsay wakes up at Marky's ostrich farm he shares with his mother, where she is frustrated with herself for listening to the shaman.
57	4	"The B. Team"	Michael	Troy Miller and Mitchell Hurwitz	Mitchell Hurwitz & Jim Vallely	May 26, 2013	4AJD02
Having seen a picture of Michael in the in-flight magazine, Ron Howard is inspired to make a movie about him, and summons Michael to meet him at Imagine Entertainment. Kitty Sanchez, George Sr.'s former assistant, now works at the studio as a producer, after betraying Maeby's lack of a high school diploma to steal her job. In exchange for the rights to Michael's "inspiring father/son story", Ron agrees to make him a producer on the project. Ron tells Michael that he wants his daughter, Rebel Alley, who Michael thinks is Ron's mistress, to play Michael's wife, Tracey, in the film. Although at first reluctant to participate in the movie and not wanting to become involved with his father again, Michael commits to the idea after using his business card (which lists him as an executive producer) to flirt with a struggling actress/musician (Isla Fisher) whom he literally bumps into on the street. After a fight with his father, Michael procrastinates his job securing the rights by attempting to cast actors for the movie (Carl Weathers and Andy Richter), and hiring George's prison warden as a screenwriter (James Lipton). Learning about Michael's selfish motive to become a producer to impress a girl, who Michael doesn't actually know the name of, George reconciles with Michael and agrees to sign over his movie rights. However, Michael learns from Ron that the father/son story he is interested in is actually the story of Michael and George Michael. On their date, Michael and the actress make out in a photo-booth, leading his to learn from a photo of her tattoo that her name is Rebel, whom Michael still believes to be Ron's mistress.
58	5	"A New Start"	Tobias	Mitchell Hurwitz and Troy Miller	Dean Lorey & Jim Vallely	May 26, 2013	4AJD07
Tobias is depressed after learning that the Bluths all think he's gay. Finding his wife's copy of Eat, Pray, Love, Tobias is also inspired to go to India, and ends up booking a trip to the same city Lindsay did. Despite traveling on the same flight and other close encounters, neither Tobias or Lindsay are aware of each other being there. Hospitalized due to a bus accident, a comment from an Indian doctor that he should be in comedies motivates Tobias to try again to become an actor and he returns to California. At his method acting class, actually a methadone clinic, he befriends a patient named Debrie who he thinks is an actress. After a double-date with Lindsay and Marky Bark, Debrie learns that Tobias is a doctor and can write drug prescriptions ("scrips" for short). After a kiss, the two run off together and pathetically attempt to make it as Fantastic Four-themed street performers. After Tobias saves Lucille 2 from an ostrich attack, she offers him a job at her rehab clinic, which has a starting salary of $120,000 a year, but Tobias turns it down to try to keep his and Debrie's "dream" alive. Debrie is upset by this and leaves Tobias. Depressed once more, Tobias tries to meet Maeby while still in his Thing costume. Walking into the model home making inadvertent innuendos, he is accidentally a participant on a local show called To Entrap a Local Predator and is arrested as a sex offender.
59	6	"Double Crossers"	George Sr.	Troy Miller and Mitchell Hurwitz	Dean Lorey & Richard Rosenstock	May 26, 2013	4AJD04
George Sr. successfully bribes politician Herbert Love into supporting the building of his wall after encountering Lindsay at one of Love's fundraisers, who gives him a check she believes Lucille gave to Maeby for plastic surgery. However, upon returning to his "Sweat and Squeeze" camp, he learns that the property is actually in Mexico, not on the border. As George Sr. attempts to get the wall's building cancelled through Michael's connections and struggles with new feelings of extreme emotion and delicacy, his twin brother Oscar schemes against him by sleeping with Lucille and threatening to reveal his role in the "Sweat and Squeeze" scheme. Meanwhile, Michael is afraid that if he calls George-Michael about acquiring his movie rights, he will be once more intruding upon his life but after an encounter with Gob in the model home, Gob offers to call George-Michael for him. At the Cinco de Cuatro festival, George Sr. arrives and is informed of Michael's success but also receives bad news from Dr. Norman, who tells George of his low testosterone levels, but high estrogen levels. When Herbert Love fails to make his speech, George Sr. dons a red wig and retreats back into the penthouse where he begins to live as a woman.
60	7	"Colony Collapse"	Gob	Troy Miller and Mitchell Hurwitz	Mitchell Hurwitz & Jim Vallely	May 26, 2013	4AJD08
Gob continues the relationship with Ann Veal that he formed at the end of the third season, under the belief that he has George-Michael's approval. He later attempts to break up with her, but ends up having sex with her. After accidentally proposing to Ann, Gob announces on the Christian talk show 'And As It Is Such So Also As Such Is It Unto You', which Ann's father co-hosts, that he will be performing a magical illusion at their wedding. Gob plans to disappear inside a cave and re-appear after three days but this goes wrong when his secret compartment fails to open and Gob is knocked unconscious and trapped inside a hollow boulder, being found days later in the back of a storage unit. After Ann announces that she is leaving him, Gob re-connects with his son Steve Holt who offers him a job. Gob fails to show up the next day after falling in with a group of celebrities led by singer Mark Cherry. Shamed by this new lifestyle, Gob falls into a cycle of taking 'Forget-me-now' pills which make him forget that he took the last pill but not the events that resulted in him taking the pill, eventually ending up in a Mexican hospital. After his sick bees hospitalize the whole of Gob's gang when they escape into the back of his limo, Gob takes a job at his father's "Sweat and Squeeze" camp where he unexpectedly discovers the cave he used for the illusion at the wedding. Examining the secret panel, Gob discovers it was jammed shut by a crucifix, which he takes as a 'T' for Tony Wonder.
61	8	"Red Hairing"	Lindsay	Troy Miller and Mitchell Hurwitz	Caroline Williams & Richard Rosenstock	May 26, 2013	4AJD06
Sick of living on his ostrich farm, Lindsay convinces boyfriend Marky Bark to move into her mother's empty apartment with her, along with his ostrich 'Cindy'. Marky comes up with a scheme to spray politician Herbert Love with ink and glitter and requests Lindsay's help to infiltrate his fundraiser and signal Marky to emerge from the podium in which he will be hiding. At the fundraiser, Lindsay is hit on by Herbert Love himself without knowing who he is and begins sexual relations with him while Marky is caught and imprisoned when Lindsay doesn't help him. Encountering Michael, Lindsay agrees to hand over her movie rights and talk to Herbert about the wall in exchange for Michael's help to release Marky. Michael meanwhile is hurt when George-Michael both doesn't show up to the meeting arranged by Gob and lies to him about his reasons for not being there. When Lindsay discovers Marky has been released from jail with Michael's help and he asks her to assist his plan to blow-up Herbert Love's boat at Cinco de Cuatro, she plans to tell Love about Marky's plans. However, Love calls off their relationship before she can do so and Lindsay retaliates by trying to publicly shame Love, causing a riot of the Mexicans when she mentions the wall, but accidentally wins over the crowd. When Love unexpectedly turns up in a coma, Lindsay accepts an offer to run in his place.
62	9	"Smashed"	Tobias	Mitchell Hurwitz and Troy Miller	Dean Lorey & Richard Rosenstock	May 26, 2013	4AJD15
Tobias begins working at Lucille Austero's rehab clinic so that he doesn't have to serve time in jail and, encountering Debrie at the clinic, organizes a Fantastic Four musical with the permission of warden Argyle Austero (Lucille's brother) so that he can get close to her again. When he fails to acquire the rights to the Fantastic Four from Ron Howard and Michael learns that Rebel Alley is in fact Ron Howard's daughter, Tobias lies to his cast about having the rights so that the production will go on. At Cinco de Cuatro, Lucille Bluth's harsh criticism of Debrie's performance during rehearsal and Tobias' failure to comfort her lead to her relapsing and being threatened with jail for copyright infringement. Tobias gives the Thing costume to Buster and takes Debrie's place as Sue Storm but accidentally boards the wrong boat, taking an unexpected part in Marky's plan to bomb Herbert Love's boat when he is mistaken for Lindsay in his Sue Storm wig. Meanwhile, the performance of the musical goes ahead despite not having a Sue Storm or a villain, and it is left unknown who plays the Thing.
63	10	"Queen B."	Lucille	Troy Miller and Mitchell Hurwitz	Richard Rosenstock & Dean Lorey	May 26, 2013	4AJD10
Lucille prepares for her trial by preparing a story that she was trying to save Buster by piloting the boat away from shore, with Buster as the 'star witness'. When none of her family show up to the trial for various reasons, Lucille is found guilty and sent to jail as a result of Lucille Austero's testimony against her. In prison, Lucille joins a gang of Chinese women called the Jade Triad, and rises to the top of the gang when she shows them a loophole around the 'No Smoking' rule but they turn on her when she causes trouble among the Triad members. Fearing for her life, Lucille gets herself transferred out of the prison to Lucille Austero's clinic where Tobias becomes her therapist. Lucille at first refuses to try therapy but when Tobias accidentally calls her a 'villain', she rants furiously at him and accepts a part as the villain of his Fantastic Four musical. After Michael signs over his rights to the Bluth Company to Lucille, Gene Parmesan helps Michael tail Gob, whom he believes to be Rebel's secret boyfriend. At Cinco de Cuatro, Lucille plans to board a boat and sail out of the reach of the law but after encountering and rejecting both George Sr. and Oscar, Tobias unwittingly correctly psychoanalyzes her and she decides to return to rehab. Meanwhile, as a resolution to the previous episode's cliffhanger, Herbert Love's boat is saved from destruction after Marky mixes up Lindsay and Tobias' cases.
64	11	"A New Attitude"	Gob	Mitchell Hurwitz and Troy Miller	Mitchell Hurwitz & Jim Vallely	May 26, 2013	4AJD14
Believing Tony Wonder to be responsible for the ruin of his life, Gob seeks revenge against him. Pretending to be gay with George-Michael as his fake boyfriend, Gob infiltrates the Gay Club where Tony is performing but fails to sabotage Tony's act. Tony and Gob unexpectedly end up connecting and having a fun night together. Tony, who is also pretending to be gay as part of a scheme with Sally Sitwell to acquire Gob's phone and retrieve the Fakeblock software from Gob's 'boyfriend' George-Michael, agrees to another date with Gob at the Little Ballroom. However, both Gob and Tony seem to be falling in love with each other for real. The next day, Gob goes to the wrong Little Ballroom where he encounters Michael who has been tailing him, believing him to be Rebel's boyfriend. The two fight and Michael kicks Gob, Lucille and George Sr. out of the movie in frustration at his family. Gob goes to Tony Wonder to apologize and the two spend an evening together, becoming close friends and realizing that they may be falling for each other, and agree to have sex on the night of Cinco de Cuatro. Gob arrives at Cinco first and encounters Ann, who reveals she has a five-year-old child with Tony Wonder, and Gob realizes Tony has just been pretending to be gay. Gob schemes to make Ann have sex with Tony wearing a 'Gob' mask whilst being filmed in an attempt to expose Tony as straight but Ann turns on him and tricks Gob into having sex with the real Tony. The morning after, Gob encounters Michael, and talks in a roundabout way about how he has realized that he has fallen in love with Tony Wonder, and forces Michael to take a 'Forget-me-now' pill when Michael realizes Gob has slept with Tony Wonder. Not remembering the events of Cinco de Cuatro, Michael makes the same embarrassing offer to Lucille Austero over the phone again and calls Rebel who is busy with her real mystery boyfriend, revealed to be George-Michael.
65	12	"Señoritis"	Maeby	Mitchell Hurwitz and Troy Miller	Jim Brandon & Brian Singleton	May 26, 2013	4AJD09
Ignored by her parents and unable to continue working as a movie producer without a high school diploma, Maeby illegally re-enrolls in high school by pretending to be 17. After giving up the model home to the "To Entrap a Local Predator" crew to earn money, Maeby learns that she has won a Lifetime Achievement award at the Opies. However, when she attends the ceremony with George-Michael, she realizes that the award is only given to those who are dead or whose careers are dying. Seeking to revive her career, she announces that she is creating an Internet company using George-Michael's 'Fakeblock' software, despite his objections. With investors pouring in money for the idea, Maeby also successfully pimps her mother out to Herbert Love for money and schemes to incriminate her boyfriend Perfecto, whom she believes to be her high school's undercover cop, as a sexual predator. George-Michael, realizing that 'Fakeblock' is rapidly spinning out of his control, fires Maeby from the company in a fit of panic. Maeby proceeds to sleep with Perfecto, who believes her to be 17, and attends Cinco de Cuatro to obtain her latest payment from Herbert Love's aide. When Love calls off relations with Lindsay, Maeby asks Perfecto to 'bad cop' Love for her. With Love 'taken care of' by Perfecto, he also reveals to Maeby that he's not an undercover cop and is just 17. After Cinco de Cuatro, as Lucille Austero is revealed to be missing and Sally Sitwell takes over her campaign, Maeby is arrested as a sex offender by her algebra teacher Donnie Richter, who is actually the undercover cop Rocky Richter, and realizes that she will have to live in Sudden Valley, which Gob has filled with sex offenders, as the neighborhood fits all the criteria for a sex offender to live in.
66	13	"It Gets Better"	George-Michael	Troy Miller and Mitchell Hurwitz	Dean Lorey & Richard Rosenstock	May 26, 2013	4AJD12
In the years since the third season ended, George-Michael has entered college at the University of California, Irvine and, after a few formative years there (as well as a wild sexual romp while studying abroad in Spain), he goes through life with a new sense of confidence and has shed much of his meekness. He and roommate Paul develop an app for an electronic woodblock, christening it 'Fakeblock'. In an attempt to seduce Maeby and impress Michael, George-Michael lies about 'Fakeblock', claiming that it is anti-piracy software. When Maeby uses George-Michael's idea to form an Internet company, he goes along with the lie to show her that he is a risk-taker, adopting the pseudonym 'George Maharis'. But as he discovers that Maeby has managed to start a real company with money from investors, he realizes that his white lie has rapidly evolved beyond his control and turned into a scam which he has inadvertently become the center of, so he starts looking for a way to close the company as quickly as possible. However, at a planned meeting with his father Michael, he accidentally encounters Rebel, who is impressed by his new celebrity status, and lies to Michael so that he might spend more time with Rebel. Frustrated that his son is pushing away from him, Michael uses Andy Richter's membership to enter the club in search of his son.
67	14	"Off the Hook"	Buster	Mitchell Hurwitz and Troy Miller	Jim Vallely & Mitchell Hurwitz	May 26, 2013	4AJD11
After a juice-driven night with Lucille Austero, Buster wakes up to discover that he has missed his mother's trial. On a search for a new mother after Lucille Bluth disowns him, Buster moves in with Lucille Austero but she soon kicks him out for being more of a son than a lover. Buster, with nowhere else to go, re-enlists with the army to try and capture his real mother's attention, and is assigned to be a drone pilot. Buster believes he is playing a video game, and becomes skilled at the job. When he learns he is hurting real people, he suffers a panic attack and ends up injuring himself. Buster is taken to the hospital where he receives an over-sized and overly powerful left hand replacement. Buster is told by a doctor that with his powerful hand, he'll be used in battle by the army. Subsequently, he begins to deliberately fail his tests, which are being used so he gains control of his new large hand. Buster then fails the "Cute Test", (not killing an adorable kitten, showing he has control of his hand), he is discharged from the army. Buster is adopted by Ophelia Love, the wife of Herbert Love, to support Herbert's campaign as an injured war veteran. However, Ophelia begins an affair with Buster when she learns about Herbert's infidelity and then abruptly ends it, choosing to give Herbert a second chance, and kicks Buster out. Buster goes to Cinco de Cuatro seeking revenge against Herbert Love but runs into Lucille Austero, who reveals that she deliberately gave him juice the night before his mother's trial so that Lucille Bluth would be locked up. Horrified, Buster goes on a juice-fueled rampage, knocking Herbert Love into a coma. After accidentally incriminating himself into Lucille Austero's disappearance, Buster attempts and fails to use George-Michael's 'Fakeblock' software to erase the footage.
68	15	"Blockheads"	George-Michael	Mitchell Hurwitz and Troy Miller	Mitchell Hurwitz & Jim Vallely	May 26, 2013	4AJD13
Due to increasing animosity with his roommate Paul over the ownership of 'Fakeblock', George-Michael is voted out of his dorm room. George-Michael runs into Gob. Gob is able to sell a Sudden Valley home to George-Michael, who buys the house so his father will be proud of him. Rebel visits George-Michael and starts doubting their relationship, seeing the investment in real estate as a sign that George-Michael is not as easy-going as he claimed. Maeby, meanwhile, wanting revenge on George-Michael for firing her, advises Michael on how to impress Rebel. Following her advice, Michael makes love to Rebel, but after leaving her apartment he discovers from a photo that his romantic rival is his own son. Upon accidentally running into George-Michael and hearing from him that he has girlfriend-trouble, Michael takes pity on his son and decides not to reveal the truth and gives up pursuing Rebel further. At Cinco de Cuatro, Gob is in negotiation with a Mongolian horde he hired to build the Mexican wall, but as George Sr. reveal they have no money to pay the horde with, the horde is angered and goes on a rampage, being mistaken for rioting Mexicans in the process. Somewhere else, George-Michael is preparing to reveal at his keynote speech that 'Fakeblock' doesn't exist, he finds a note that promises him he will get "screwed" if he continues his plans with 'Fakeblock', and thinking that it is a promise of sex from Rebel, he decides to continue the lie. But, unbeknownst to him, the note was actually a threat from the hacktivist group, Anonymous. Michael awakes the next day, and because he was drugged by Gob, he has forgotten that he decided to give up Rebel. George-Michael, meanwhile, tells Rebel that he truly cares about her and thereby solidifies their relationship. As George-Michael leaves Rebel's place, he runs into the amnesic Michael, and realizes that he was the other guy Rebel was seeing. George-Michael is willing to pass it off as an honest mistake, until Michael inadvertently mentions the photo he saw, revealing that he knew about George-Michael and Rebel's relationship. Angered, George-Michael punches his father in the face, and the two silently stare at each other. In the post-credits scene, Gob is named as the replacement President of Bluth Company after Lucille Austero disappears. Buster is arrested for the murder of Lucille Austero. After watching the news of Buster's arrest, Ron Howard and Brian Grazer decide to make a movie about it.

=== Season 4 Remix: Fateful Consequences (2018) ===
No.	Title	Directed by	Written by	Original release date	Prod. code
1	"Re Cap'n Bluth"	Mitchell Hurwitz and Troy Miller	Mitchell Hurwitz, Dean Lorey, Richard Rosenstock, Jim Vallely, Caroline Williams	May 3, 2018	RAJD01
At the 2012 Newport Beach Cinco de Cuatro celebration, Michael, heavily in debt, attempts to seduce Lucille Austero in exchange for money. Upon returning to the model home, Michael catches Gob with an unidentified romantic partner; Gob forces Michael to swallow a "forget-me-now". In 2006, immediately after the events of "Development Arrested", Lucille is arrested by the SEC after wrecking the Queen Mary. Michael, George-Michael, and George Sr. return from their attempted escape due to George Sr.'s fear that Lucille will "flip" on him to the SEC, with Michael resuming his work as president of the Bluth Company. Three months later, Michael discovers everyone in the family has received a "stimulus package" except him, yet he is still expected to be the primary character witness in Lucille's defense at her upcoming trial. Fed up, Michael quits the Bluth Company, sells his shares in the company to Lucille Austero, and uses the money to invest in his "Sudden Valley" housing development project.
2	"Three Half Men"	Troy Miller and Mitchell Hurwitz	Mitchell Hurwitz, Richard Rosenstock, Jim Vallely	May 3, 2018	RAJD02
Buster inadvertently causes the SEC to take Lucille into custody by letting it slip that she was attempting to flee their jurisdiction. George Sr. runs into his twin brother, Oscar, and discovers he is now living in the desert along the U.S.–Mexico border. Buster, now alone in the penthouse, begins acting as if Lucille is still living there, constructing a homemade life-size Lucille doll and conversing with it. At a meeting with Stan Sitwell, George Sr. spies a page of blueprints for what he believes is a "monument to George W. Bush" and snaps a picture of it with his phone. George Sr. shows the picture to Lucille while visiting her in prison, whereupon she deduces the plans are actually for a border wall that Sitwell is planning to build for the U.S. government. The two conspire to underbid Sitwell for the project, along with deciding to pretend to divorce until the conclusion of Lucille's trial in order to avoid arousing suspicion from the authorities. Gob's relationship with George-Michael's former girlfriend, Ann, grows more complicated as he attempts to use her father's church as the setting for his "resurrection" illusion. Gob inadvertently proposes marriage to Ann and she accepts. At the wedding, at which he plans to perform his illusion, Gob is dismayed to find none of his family is in attendance.
3	"A Couple-A New Starts"	Mitchell Hurwitz and Troy Miller	Mitchell Hurwitz, Dean Lorey, Jim Vallely, Caroline Williams	May 3, 2018	RAJD03
In the aftermath of the wreck of the Queen Mary, Lindsay decides to leave Tobias and, inspired by the book Eat, Pray, Love, travels to India in an attempt to "live with less" that, predictably, ends up leaving her with no money and a maxed-out credit card. Tobias finds Lindsay's copy of the book and decides to travel to India as well, only to end up in the hospital after getting hit by a bus. A visit to a local shaman inspires Lindsay to return home, though she is forced to make up with Tobias as a condition of Lucille—who wants the entire family present at her upcoming trial—paying for her return flight. While Michael continues developing Sudden Valley, Lindsay and Tobias use their "stimulus package" to buy an extravagant house on an adjustable rate mortgage. As Lindsay prepares her testimony for Lucille's trial (in exchange for money from Lucille), Tobias attempts to revive his acting career, with little success. The collapse of the California real estate market spells disaster not only for Lindsay and Tobias' finances, but also for Sudden Valley.
4	"Just Deserters"	Troy Miller and Mitchell Hurwitz	Mitchell Hurwitz, Dean Lorey, Richard Rosenstock, Jim Vallely	May 3, 2018	RAJD04
Lucille, now on house arrest, vetoes George Sr.'s original plan to sell the desert land along the U.S.–Mexico border he has purchased to the U.S. government, convincing him to pitch Sitwell's border wall plan to the government at a much lower price. Buster threatens to refuse to testify as the "key witness" at Lucille's trial unless he receives his share of the "stimulus package", which he promptly spends on a diamond-studded hook. When George Sr. and Lucille announce their "divorce" to the family, Gob decides to use the occasion to announce his upcoming marriage to Ann. The economic downturn causes the government to put the border wall project on hold, leading George Sr. to panic, as he is now unable to make the payments on the land he has purchased. A session in Oscar's sweat lodge inspires George Sr. to begin a "sweat and squeeze" operation for business executives as a way to recoup the lost money. Gob performs his "resurrection" illusion at his wedding, only for it to go horribly wrong. Three months of house arrest with Buster for company prove to be almost too much for Lucille to take.
5	"A Trial Run"	Mitchell Hurwitz and Troy Miller	Mitchell Hurwitz, Dean Lorey, Richard Rosenstock, Jim Vallely, Caroline Williams	May 3, 2018	RAJD05
On the day of Lucille's maritime trial, none of the family appear in court. Lindsay and Tobias attend what they believe to be a method acting class, only to discover it is a rehab session for methadone addicts. Tobias, still believing it to be an acting class, becomes friendly with Debrie Bardeaux, a washed up actress who is now a drug addict, while a disgusted Lindsay becomes acquainted with Marky Bark, son of Johnny Bark and a friend of Debrie's. Gob, having been rescued from his failed "resurrection" illusion, recovers in the hospital, where a furious Ann calls off their engagement. George Sr. misses the trial due to his work on the sweat and squeeze operation, as well as maintaining the pretense of his fake divorce, while "key witness" Buster is incapacitated from gorging on juice at Lucille Austero's. A desperate Lucille calls Lucille Austero to the stand on her behalf, only for the testimony to devolve into passive-aggressive bickering between the two. Lindsay abandons Tobias and begins a relationship with Marky Bark. Lucille is found guilty and sentenced to 3–5 years in prison.
6	"The Parent Traps"	Troy Miller and Mitchell Hurwitz	Mitchell Hurwitz, Dean Lorey, Richard Rosenstock, Jim Vallely	May 3, 2018	RAJD06
By the spring of 2012, Michael has moved into George-Michael's dorm room at UC Irvine following the collapse of the Sudden Valley project, much to George-Michael's chagrin. A frustrated George-Michael tells Michael he is developing a software program to protect people's privacy called "Fakeblock". With Lucille in prison and refusing to see him, Buster resumes his relationship with Lucille Austero. Following his release from the hospital, Gob attempts to reconnect with his son Steve Holt. Michael, annoyed with George-Michael's roommate "P-Hound", proposes he and George-Michael vote P-Hound out of the room, drafting Maeby (whom George-Michael has been tutoring) into his plan. To his surprise, Michael is voted out of the room. Lucille Austero breaks off her relationship with Buster; with nowhere else to go, Buster re-enlists in the Army.
7	"One Degree of Separation"	Mitchell Hurwitz and Troy Miller	Jim Brandon, Dean Lorey, Richard Rosenstock, Brian Singleton, Jim Vallely, Caroline Williams	May 3, 2018	RAJD07
Following the wreck of the Queen Mary, George-Michael and Maeby decide not to begin a romantic relationship. In a bid to get Lindsay and Tobias to notice her, Maeby deliberately fails her senior year of high school, only to realize they have left for India. Still working as a film executive for Imagine Entertainment, Maeby flies to India to scout locations for an upcoming film. Upon seeing Lindsay in India, Maeby uses her crew's makeup artist to pose as Lindsay's shaman and is infuriated to see Lindsay lie about Maeby's existence. At George-Michael's graduation party, Michael forces George-Michael to destroy the check George Sr. and Lucille gave him as a gift, gives George-Michael the stair car, and sends him off to college. Having failed her "sophomore" senior year, Maeby is fired from her job at Imagine by Ron Howard's assistant, former Bluth Company employee Kitty Sanchez, due to not having a high school diploma. George-Michael's college career is interrupted by a surprise visit from Michael, who moves in with him. Maeby, who is now on her fifth senior year of high school, discovers George-Michael has been assigned as her math tutor. Maeby suspects her high school boyfriend, Perfecto Telles, is actually an undercover cop.
8	"The Weak Become the Strong"	Troy Miller and Mitchell Hurwitz	Jim Brandon, Mitchell Hurwitz, Richard Rosenstock, Brian Singleton, Jim Vallely, Caroline Williams	May 3, 2018	RAJD08
9	"Modern Marvels"	Mitchell Hurwitz and Troy Miller	Mitchell Hurwitz, Dean Lorey, Jim Vallely, Caroline Williams	May 3, 2018	RAJD09
10	"Recurring Dreams"	Troy Miller and Mitchell Hurwitz	Jim Brandon, Mitchell Hurwitz, Dean Lorey, Richard Rosenstock, Brian Singleton, Jim Vallely	May 3, 2018	RAJD10
11	"Fun Night"	Mitchell Hurwitz and Troy Miller	Jim Brandon, Mitchell Hurwitz, Dean Lorey, Richard Rosenstock, Brian Singleton, Jim Vallely, Caroline Williams	May 3, 2018	RAJD11
12	"Moving Pictures"	Troy Miller and Mitchell Hurwitz	Mitchell Hurwitz, Dean Lorey, Richard Rosenstock, Jim Vallely, Caroline Williams	May 3, 2018	RAJD12
13	"Get on Up"	Mitchell Hurwitz and Troy Miller	Mitchell Hurwitz, Dean Lorey, Richard Rosenstock, Jim Vallely	May 3, 2018	RAJD13
14	"What Goes Around"	Troy Miller and Mitchell Hurwitz	Mitchell Hurwitz, Dean Lorey, Richard Rosenstock, Jim Vallely	May 3, 2018	RAJD14
15	"Locked and Loaded"	Mitchell Hurwitz and Troy Miller	Jim Brandon, Mitchell Hurwitz, Dean Lorey, Richard Rosenstock, Brian Singleton, Caroline Williams	May 3, 2018	RAJD15
16	"Mixed Messages"	Troy Miller and Mitchell Hurwitz	Mitchell Hurwitz, Dean Lorey, Richard Rosenstock, Jim Vallely	May 3, 2018	RAJD16
17	"Dire Straights"	Mitchell Hurwitz and Troy Miller	Jim Brandon, Mitchell Hurwitz, Dean Lorey, Richard Rosenstock, Brian Singleton, Caroline Williams	May 3, 2018	RAJD17
18	"Turning on Each Other"	Troy Miller and Mitchell Hurwitz	Mitchell Hurwitz, Dean Lorey, Richard Rosenstock, Jim Vallely, Caroline Williams	May 3, 2018	RAJD18
19	"Fast Company"	Mitchell Hurwitz and Troy Miller	Jim Brandon, Mitchell Hurwitz, Dean Lorey, Richard Rosenstock, Brian Singleton	May 3, 2018	RAJD19
20	"Cinco de Cuatro I"	Troy Miller and Mitchell Hurwitz	Jim Brandon, Mitchell Hurwitz, Dean Lorey, Richard Rosenstock, Brian Singleton, Jim Vallely, Caroline Williams	May 3, 2018	RAJD20
This episode is about what happened to Maeby and Lindsay on Cinco de Cuatro.
21	"Cinco de Cuatro II"	Mitchell Hurwitz and Troy Miller	Mitchell Hurwitz, Dean Lorey, Richard Rosenstock, Jim Vallely	May 3, 2018	RAJD21
This episode is about what happened to Lucille, Tobias, George Sr., and Buster on Cinco de Cuatro.
22	"Cinco de Cuatro III"	Troy Miller and Mitchell Hurwitz	Mitchell Hurwitz, Dean Lorey, Richard Rosenstock, Jim Vallely, Caroline Williams	May 3, 2018	RAJD22
This episode is about what happened to George Michael, Gob, and Michael on Cinco de Cuatro.

== Reception ==
=== Critical response ===
Reviews of the fourth season were generally positive, with Bateman's performance receiving high praise. On Rotten Tomatoes, it holds an approval rating of 79% with an average score of 7.9/10, based on 147 reviews. The site's critical consensus reads, "Though this new incarnation of the hit series isn't quite as effective, Arrested Development's fourth season still delivers the dark humor and running gags we've come to expect." On the review aggregator website, Metacritic, the fourth season has a weighted average score of 72 out of 100, based on 21 critics, indicating "generally favorable" reviews.

Mike Hale, writing for The New York Times after watching the first eight episodes, said that "Along the way there are doses of self-referential and metafictional humor that have made the show a cult item—enough for fans to compile lists, but not enough to re-enliven the episodes or distract from the story's dullness". Robert Lloyd, writing for the Los Angeles Times, praised the series, suggesting that it improves after several episodes. The A.V. Club's Emily VanDerWerff graded the season overall with a 'B', writing that "It is, in places, masterful. It is also, in other places, at once weirdly pleased with itself and too ready to hold the audience's hand where that hand needn't be held", and that "The scope of the whole project is hard to deny for its ambition and audacity." David M. Cook of WhatCulture! gave the new season a positive review calling it "The Triumphant Return Of The Bluths". He said "it was great to see the Bluths return in such fine form" and that he "found a lot of the season to be funnier than anything that had come before it". Gem Wheeler of Den of Geek argued that the fourth season was "Arrested Development's best yet", and "the Bluths officially rule the pop culture landscape. Long may they reign."

Brian Lowry of Variety gave the season a negative review, writing, "Ultimately, this 'Arrested' revival plays a bit like a reunion special, where the individual cast members come out and take their curtain calls. After the warmth of seeing them reunited (or semi-reunited, given how rarely more than one or two are featured in a scene together), there's a sort of awkwardness to it, as if nobody really has much to say. We're meant to bask in the nostalgia, while the particulars are of relatively little consequence." Nathan Rabin of The Wall Street Journal similarly wrote, "Arrested Development has lost a step or two in its long stint on the sidelines. The pacing is notably slower than during its original run and the show lacks the breathtaking density that characterized its glorious past. At its worst, the new/old Arrested Development is reduced to doing a shaky imitation of itself: the characters and themes are there but the beats are slightly off, as is the tone".

David Pierce of The Verge also gave it a mixed review, writing "Season four is kind of a confused mess, but then so is the Bluth family—and both somehow work despite all the chaos. From the way it was shot to the way it was released, the show was an experiment—covering a few events many ways, showing us the world through every character's eyes. It's very clearly just set-up in the larger sense, building toward something bigger for Arrested Development. But the question is, what's next?" He also commented positively, saying, "Season four is absolutely worthy of the Arrested Development name, though you'll have to slog through three episodes before it becomes so". The Guardian's Hadley Freeman criticized the season, stating that "the biggest problem with having the episodes devoted to one character at a time. Each Bluth is such an extreme personality that a whole 35 mins of them makes you understand why none of them can live with one another." Freeman added that "the way various scenes intersect and explain events from past episodes is fun and oddly Pulp Fiction-like."

The season 4 remix, Fateful Consequences, received generally negative reviews from critics. On Rotten Tomatoes, it holds an approval rating of 25% with an average score of 5.3/10, based on 12 reviews. The site's critical consensus reads, "They've made a huge mistake."

=== Accolades ===
The fourth season earned the series three Primetime Emmy Award nominations for the 65th Primetime Emmy Awards, including Outstanding Lead Actor in a Comedy Series for Jason Bateman, Outstanding Single-Camera Picture Editing for a Comedy Series, and Outstanding Music Composition for a Series. For the 20th Screen Actors Guild Awards, the cast was nominated for Best Comedy Ensemble and Jason Bateman was nominated for Best Comedy Actor. Bateman also received a nomination for Best Comedy Actor for the 71st Golden Globe Awards.

== Future ==
=== Planned film ===
Show creator Mitchell Hurwitz said that the fourth season would serve as the precursor to a future full-length Arrested Development film. Rumors of a film circulated after the possibility was suggested in the final episode of the third season, "Development Arrested". In 2008, it was reported that production of Arrested Development: The Movie would begin after the completion of the fourth season, with a script to be written by Hurwitz. In 2008, Ron Howard was slated to direct the film. At the time it was reported that all original members of the main cast were expected to reprise their original roles. In August 2013, Hurwitz commented "I'm working on the movie right now" and his plan was to do another season after the film is completed. However, season 5 was released in May 2018, without any work progressing on a film. In October 2018, star David Cross said he thought the show was done and there would be no film.

=== Fifth season ===
Netflix confirmed on May 17, 2017, that a fifth season featuring the full cast had been ordered and that the season would include 16 episodes split into two eight-episode parts; the first half was released on May 29, 2018, and the second was released on March 15, 2019.

== Home media ==
The fourth season was released on DVD in region 1 on December 16, 2014, in region 2 on June 9, 2014, and in region 4 on August 27, 2014.
