= List of awards and nominations received by Arrested Development =

Awards and nominations received by Arrested Development
Awards and nominations
Award	Wins	Nominations
ADG Excellence in Production Design Awards	1	2
American Film Institute Awards	2	2
American Cinema Editors Awards	1	3
American Comedy Awards	0	4
Artios Awards	2	2
Costume Designers Guild Awards	0	1
Emmy Awards	6	25
Golden Globe Awards	1	4
Key Art Awards	4	5
Golden Reel Awards	0	1
Golden Nymph	1	1
People's Choice Awards	0	1
Producers Guild of America Awards	0	3
Satellite Awards	6	11
Screen Actors Guild Awards	0	5
Television Critics Association Awards	3	8
Teen Choice Awards	0	1
TV Land Awards	1	1
Writers Guild of America Awards	1	3
Young Artist Awards	1	1

Totals (Note: Certain award groups do not simply award one winner. They acknowledge several different recipients, have runners-up, and have third place. Since this is a specific recognition and is different from losing an award, runner-up mentions are considered wins in this award tally. For simplification and to avoid errors, each award in this list has been presumed to have had a prior nomination.)
- Wins: 30
- Nominations: 84

Arrested Development is an American television sitcom that aired for three seasons on the Fox network from November 2, 2003, to February 10, 2006, and began streaming a fourth season on Netflix on May 26, 2013. The show centers on the Bluth family, a formerly wealthy, habitually dysfunctional family, and is presented in a continuous format, incorporating hand-held camera work, narration, archival photos, and historical footage.

Since its debut, the series has earned widespread critical acclaim and has been nominated for a variety of different awards. Arrested Development has received nominations for twenty-five Primetime Emmy Awards (six wins for the series, including Outstanding Comedy Series in 2004), eight TCA Awards (three wins), four Golden Globe Awards (one win), three Writers Guild of America Awards (one win), five Screen Actors Guild Awards, three Producers Guild of America Awards, among other awards.

Lead actor Jason Bateman has been nominated for ten individual awards for his role as Michael Bluth, the President of the Bluth Company, winning the Golden Globe Award for Best Actor in a Comedy Series and two Satellite Awards for Best Actor in a Comedy Series. Series creator Mitchell Hurwitz won three Primetime Emmy Awards from six nominations for his role as a writer and producer of the series. Arrested Development has been nominated for 82 awards and has won 30.

== Emmy Awards ==
Awarded since 1949, the Primetime Emmy Award is an annual accolade bestowed by members of the Academy of Television Arts & Sciences recognizing outstanding achievements in American prime time television programming. Awards presented for more technical and production-based categories (like art direction, casting, and editing) are designated "Creative Arts Emmy Awards." Arrested Development has been nominated for a total of twenty-two awards and won six.

=== Primetime Emmy Awards ===
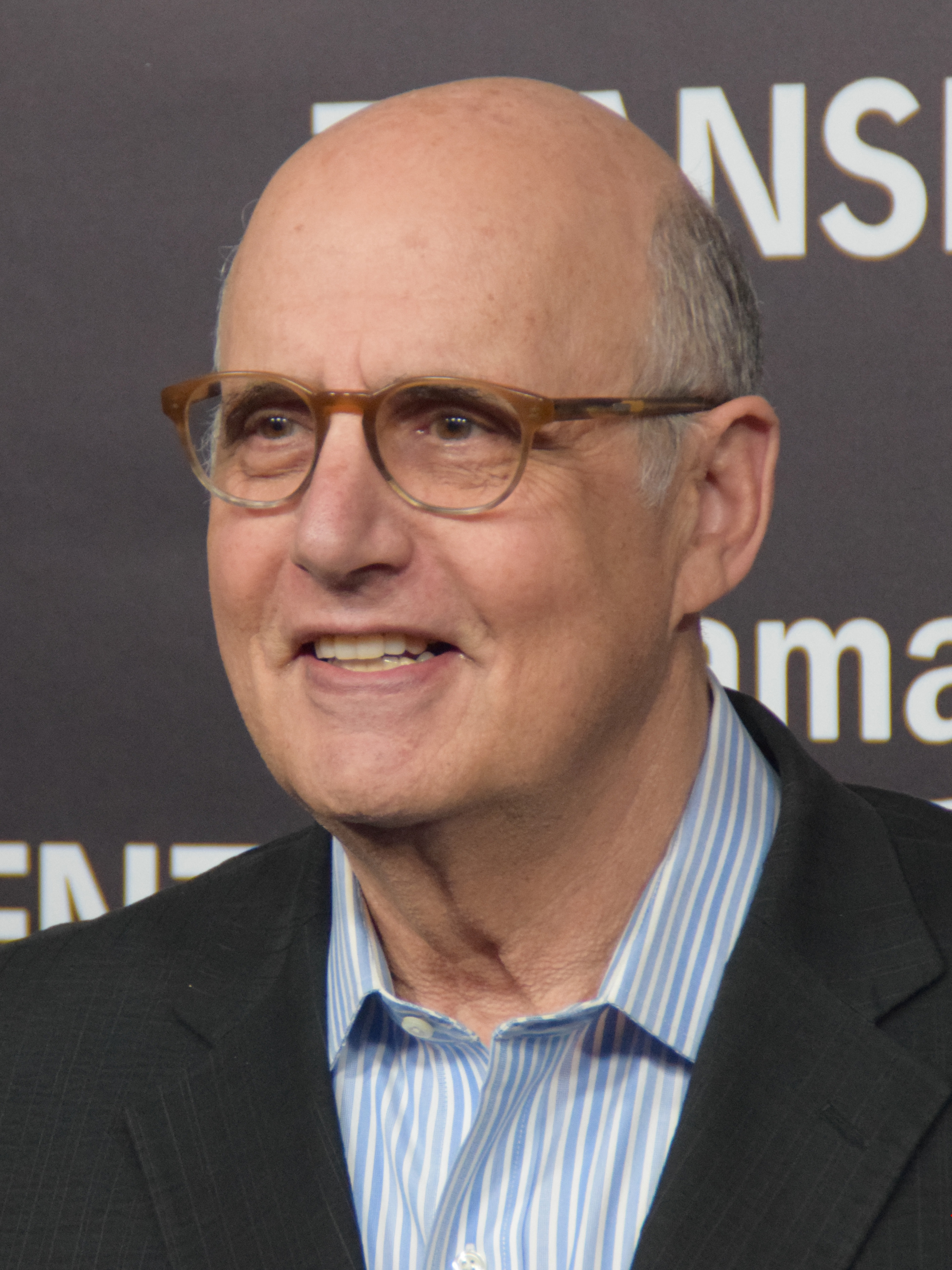
In 2004 and 2005, Jeffrey Tambor was nominated for the Primetime Emmy Award for Outstanding Supporting Actor in a Comedy Series

List of Primetime Emmy Awards and nominations received by Arrested Development
Year	Category	Nominee(s)	Episode	Result	Ref.
2004	Outstanding Comedy Series	^{see below}		Won	
2004	Outstanding Directing for a Comedy Series	Anthony Russo and Joe Russo	"Pilot"	Won	
2004	Outstanding Supporting Actor in a Comedy Series	Jeffrey Tambor		Nominated	
2004	Outstanding Writing for a Comedy Series	Mitchell Hurwitz	"Pilot"	Won	
2005	Outstanding Comedy Series	^{see below}		Nominated	
2005	Outstanding Lead Actor in a Comedy Series	Jason Bateman		Nominated	
2005	Outstanding Supporting Actor in a Comedy Series	Jeffrey Tambor		Nominated	
2005	Outstanding Supporting Actress in a Comedy Series	Jessica Walter	"Motherboy XXX"	Nominated	
2005	Outstanding Writing for a Comedy Series	Mitchell Hurwitz & Jim Vallely	"Righteous Brothers"	Won	
2005	Outstanding Writing for a Comedy Series	Barbie Adler	"Sad Sack"	Nominated	
2005	Outstanding Writing for a Comedy Series	Brad Copeland	"Sword of Destiny"	Nominated	
2006	Outstanding Comedy Series	^{see below}		Nominated	
2006	Outstanding Supporting Actor in a Comedy Series	Will Arnett		Nominated	
2006	Outstanding Writing for a Comedy Series	Richard Day (story by), Mitchell Hurwitz (story by), Chuck Tatham (teleplay by), Jim Vallely (teleplay by)	"Development Arrested"	Nominated	
2013	Outstanding Lead Actor in a Comedy Series	Jason Bateman		Nominated	

^2004 "Outstanding Comedy Series" nominees: Barbie Feldman Adler, Brian Grazer, Ron Howard, Victor Hsu, Mitchell Hurwitz, John Levenstein, Chuck Martin, David Nevins, Richard Rosenstock

^2005 "Outstanding Comedy Series" nominees: Barbie Adler, John Amodeo, Brad Copeland, Brian Grazer, Ron Howard, Mitchell Hurwitz, Chuck Martin, David Nevins, Richard Rosenstock, Jim Vallely

^2006 "Outstanding Comedy Series" nominees: John Amodeo, Richard Day, Brian Grazer, Ron Howard, Mitchell Hurwitz, Dean Lorey, David Nevins, Tom Saunders, Chuck Tatham, Jim Vallely, Ron Weiner

=== Primetime Creative Arts Emmy Awards ===
List of Creative Arts Emmy Awards and nominations received by Arrested Development
Year	Category	Nominee(s)	Episode	Result	Ref.
2004	Outstanding Art Direction for a Multi-Camera Series	Denny Dugally, Charisse Cardenas, and Ellen Brill	"Pilot"	Nominated	
2004	Outstanding Casting for a Comedy Series	Deborah Barylski, Geraldine Leder		Won	
2004	Outstanding Single-Camera Picture Editing for a Comedy Series	Lee Haxall	"Pilot"	Won	
2005	Outstanding Casting for a Comedy Series	Alison Jones		Nominated	
2005	Outstanding Single-Camera Picture Editing for a Comedy Series	Robert Bramwell	"Motherboy XXX"	Nominated	
2005	Outstanding Single-Camera Picture Editing for a Comedy Series	Richard Candib	"Good Grief"	Nominated	
2005	Outstanding Single-Camera Picture Editing for a Comedy Series	Steven Sprung	"Let 'Em Eat Cake"	Nominated	
2006	Outstanding Single-Camera Picture Editing for a Comedy Series	Stuart Bass	"The Ocean Walker"	Nominated	
2013	Outstanding Music Composition for a Series	David Schwartz	"Flight of the Phoenix"	Nominated	
2013	Outstanding Single-Camera Picture Editing for a Comedy Series	Kabir Akhtar and A.J. Dickerson	"Flight of the Phoenix"	Nominated	

== Golden Globe Awards ==
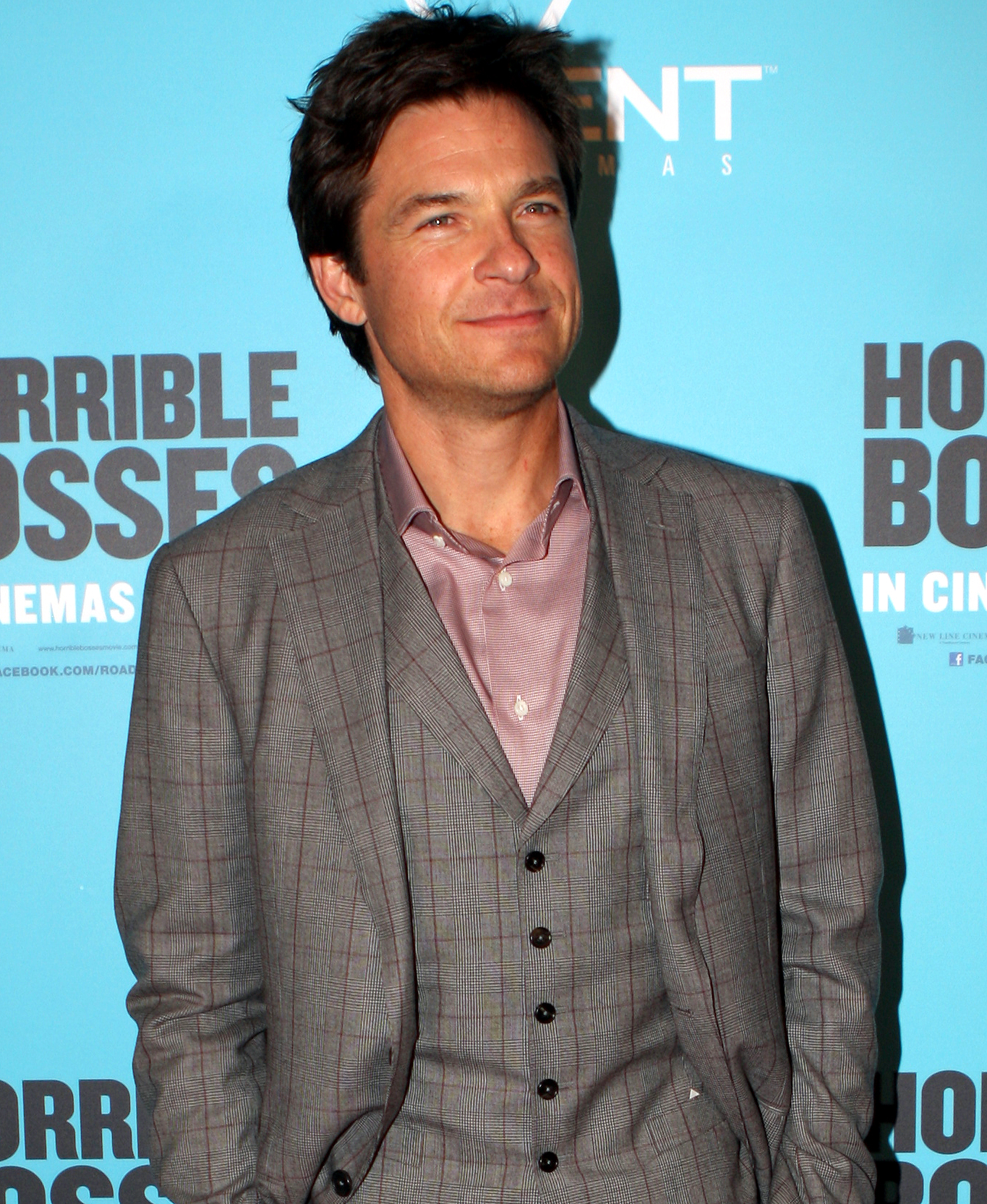
In 2005, Jason Bateman won the Golden Globe Award for Best Actor in a Television Series – Musical or Comedy

The Golden Globe Award is an annual accolade bestowed by members of the Hollywood Foreign Press Association recognizing outstanding achievements in film and television. Arrested Development has been nominated for four awards and won one.

List of Golden Globe Awards and nominations received by Arrested Development
Year	Category	Nominee(s)	Result	Ref.
2004	Best Television Series – Musical or Comedy		Nominated	
2005	Best Actor in a Television Series – Musical or Comedy	Jason Bateman	Won	
2005	Best Television Series – Musical or Comedy		Nominated	
2014	Best Actor in a Television Series – Musical or Comedy	Jason Bateman	Nominated	

== Producers Guild of America Awards ==
The Producers Guild of America Award is an annual accolade bestowed by the Producers Guild of America in recognition of outstanding achievements in film and television, since 1990. Arrested Development has been nominated for three awards.

List of Producers Guild of America Awards and nominations received by Arrested Development
Year	Category	Nominee(s)	Result	Ref.
2006	Episodic Television Series – Comedy		Nominated	
2007	Episodic Television Series – Comedy		Nominated	
2014	Episodic Television Series – Comedy	John Foy, Brian Grazer, Ron Howard, Mitchell Hurwitz, Dean Lorey, Troy Miller, Richard Rosenstock, Jim Vallely	Nominated	

== Satellite Awards ==
The Satellite Award is an annual accolade bestowed by members of the International Press Academy recognizing outstanding achievements in film and television. Arrested Development has been nominated for eleven awards and won six.

List of Satellite Awards and nominations received by Arrested Development
Year	Category	Nominee(s)	Result	Ref.
2004	Best Television Series – Musical or Comedy		Won	
2004	Best Supporting Actor – Television Series Musical or Comedy	Jeffrey Tambor	Won	
2004	Best Supporting Actor – Television Series Musical or Comedy	David Cross	Nominated	
2004	Best Supporting Actress – Television Series Musical or Comedy	Jessica Walter	Won	
2004	Best Supporting Actress – Television Series Musical or Comedy	Portia de Rossi	Nominated	
2005	Best Television Series – Musical or Comedy		Nominated	
2005	Best Actor – Television Series Musical or Comedy	Jason Bateman	Won	
2005	Best Actress – Television Series Musical or Comedy	Portia de Rossi	Won	
2006	Best Actor – Television Series Musical or Comedy	Jason Bateman	Won	
2014	Best Actress – Television Series Musical or Comedy	Jessica Walter	Nominated	
2019	Best Television Series – Musical or Comedy		Nominated	

== Screen Actors Guild Awards ==
Awarded since 1995, the Screen Actors Guild Award is an annual accolade bestowed by members of the Screen Actors Guild recognizing outstanding achievements in acting in television. Arrested Development has been nominated for five awards.

List of Screen Actors Guild Awards and nominations received by Arrested Development
Year	Category	Nominee(s)	Result	Ref.
2004	Outstanding Performance by an Ensemble in a Comedy Series	Will Arnett, Jason Bateman, Michael Cera, David Cross, Portia de Rossi, Tony Hale, Alia Shawkat, Jeffrey Tambor, Jessica Walter	Nominated	
2004	Outstanding Performance by a Male Actor in a Comedy Series	Jason Bateman	Nominated	
2005	Outstanding Performance by an Ensemble in a Comedy Series	Will Arnett, Jason Bateman, Michael Cera, David Cross, Portia de Rossi, Tony Hale, Alia Shawkat, Jeffrey Tambor, Jessica Walter	Nominated	
2014	Outstanding Performance by an Ensemble in a Comedy Series	Will Arnett, Jason Bateman, John Beard, Michael Cera, David Cross, Portia de Rossi, Isla Fisher, Tony Hale, Ron Howard, Liza Minnelli, Alia Shawkat, Jeffrey Tambor, Jessica Walter, Henry Winkler	Nominated	
2014	Outstanding Performance by a Male Actor in a Comedy Series	Jason Bateman	Nominated	

== Television Critics Association Awards ==
The TCA Award is an annual accolade bestowed by the Television Critics Association in recognition of outstanding achievements in television. Arrested Development has been nominated for eight awards and won three.

List of TCA Awards and nominations received by Arrested Development
Year	Category	Nominee(s)	Result	Ref.
2004	Individual Achievement in Comedy	Jason Bateman	Nominated	
2004	Individual Achievement in Comedy	Jeffrey Tambor	Nominated	
2004	Outstanding Achievement in Comedy		Won	
2004	Outstanding New Program		Won	
2004	Program of the Year		Nominated	
2005	Individual Achievement in Comedy	Jason Bateman	Nominated	
2005	Outstanding Achievement in Comedy		Won	
2005	Program of the Year		Nominated	

== Writers Guild of America Awards ==
The Writers Guild of America Award is an annual accolade bestowed by the Writers Guild of America in recognition of outstanding achievements in film, television, and radio, since 1949. Arrested Development has been nominated for three awards and won one.

List of Writers Guild of America Awards and nominations received by Arrested Development
Year	Category	Nominee(s)	Episode	Result	Ref.
2004	Best Episodic Comedy	Mitchell Hurwitz & Jim Vallely	"Pier Pressure"	Won	
2005	Best Comedy Series	^{see below}		Nominated	
2006	Best Comedy Series	^{see below}		Nominated	

^2005 "Best Comedy Series" nominees: Barbie Adler, Brad Copeland, Richard Day, Karey Dornetto, Jake Farrow, Abraham Higginbotham, Mitchell Hurwitz, Sam Laybourne, John Levenstein, Courtney Lilly, Dean Lorey, Chuck Martin, Lisa Parsons, Richard Rosenstock, Tom Saunders, Maria Semple, Chuck Tatham, Jim Vallely, Ron Weiner

^2006 "Best Comedy Series" nominees: Richard Day, Karey Dornetto, Jake Farrow, Mitchell Hurwitz, Sam Laybourne, Dean Lorey, Tom Saunders, Maria Semple, Chuck Tatham, Jim Vallely, Ron Weiner

== Other awards ==
List of all other awards and nominations received by Arrested Development
Year	Award	Category	Nominee(s)	Episode	Result	Ref.
2003	American Film Institute Award	AFI TV Program of the Year			Won	
2004	ADG Excellence in Production Design Award	Excellence in Production Design in Television, Multi-Camera Series	Dawn Snyder, Liz Lapp, Luke Freeborn		Won	
2004	American Film Institute Award	AFI TV Program of the Year			Won	
2004	Artios Award (Casting Society of America)	Best Casting for Television, Comedy Episodic	Deborah Barylski, Geraldine Leder		Won	
2004	Artios Award (Casting Society of America)	Best Casting for Television, Comedy Pilot	Deborah Barylski		Won	
2004	TV Land Award	"Future Classic"			Won	
2005	American Cinema Editors Award	Best Edited Half-Hour Series for Television	Steven Sprung	"Let 'Em Eat Cake"	Nominated	
2005	Monte-Carlo Television Festival Golden Nymph	Outstanding Producer of the Year – Comedy	Brian Grazer, Ron Howard, Mitchell Hurwitz, David Nevins		Won	
2005	Teen Choice Award	"Choice V-Cast"			Nominated	
2005	Young Artist Award	Best Performance in a TV Series (Comedy or Drama) – Supporting Young Actress	Alia Shawkat		Won	
2006	American Cinema Editors Award	Best Edited Half-Hour Series for Television	Stuart Bass		Won	
2006	Costume Designers Guild Awards	Outstanding Costume Design for Television Series – Contemporary	Katie Sparks		Nominated	
2013	Key Art Award	Digital Campaign	Ignition		Silver	
2013	Key Art Award	Digital Microsite/Website	Ignition		Finalist	
2013	Key Art Award	Integrated Campaign	Ignition		Gold	
2013	Key Art Award	Print – Wild Post	Ignition		Bronze	
2013	Key Art Award	Print – Mixed Campaign	Ignition		Bronze	
2014	People's Choice Award	Favorite Streaming Series			Nominated	
2014	ADG Excellence in Production Design Award	Excellence in Production Design in Television, Half Hour Single-Camera Television Series	Dan Butts, Kate Bunch, Oana Bogdan, Jennifer Lukehart	"The B. Team"	Nominated	
2014	American Cinema Editors Award	Best Edited Half-Hour Series for Television	Kabir Akhtar and A.J. Dickerson	"Flight of the Phoenix"	Nominated	
2014	American Comedy Award	Comedy Actor – TV	Jason Bateman		Nominated	
2014	American Comedy Award	Comedy Directing – TV			Nominated	
2014	American Comedy Award	Comedy Supporting Actor – TV	Will Arnett		Nominated	
2014	American Comedy Award	Comedy Writing – TV			Nominated	
2014	Golden Reel Award	Best Sound Editing in Television – Short Form: Music	Jason Tregoe Newman	"Flight of the Phoenix"	Nominated	
