= Double Crossers (Arrested Development) =

- Arrested Development episode
- Episode no.: Season 4 Episode 6
- Directed by: Troy Miller; Mitchell Hurwitz
- Written by: Dean Lorey; Richard Rosenstock
- Cinematography by: Peter Lyons Collister
- Editing by: Kabir Akhtar; A.J. Dickerson
- Production code: 4AJD04
- Original air date: May 26, 2013
- Running time: 31 minutes

Guest appearances
- Henry Winkler as Barry Zuckerkorn; Ron Howard as himself; Terry Crews as Herbert Love; John Slattery as Doctor Norman; Chris Diamantopoulos as Divine Spirit (Note: Credited as Rich Chrisandanost); Isla Fisher as Rebel Alley; Mary Lynn Rajskub as Heartfire; Karen Maruyama as China Garden; Liza Minnelli as Lucille Austero

Episode chronology
← Previous "A New Start"	Next → "Colony Collapse"
- Arrested Development season 4

"Double Crossers" is the sixth episode of the fourth season of the American television satirical sitcom Arrested Development. It is the 59th overall episode of the series, and was written by co-executive producers Dean Lorey and Richard Rosenstock, and directed by executive producer Troy Miller and series creator Mitchell Hurwitz. It originally released on May 26, 2013, with the rest of the season, and was distributed by Netflix.

The series, narrated by Ron Howard, follows the Bluths, a formerly wealthy, dysfunctional family, who made their money from property development. The Bluth family consists of Michael, his adopted sister Lindsay, his older brother Gob, his younger brother Buster, their mother Lucille and father George Sr., as well as Michael's son George-Michael, and Lindsay and her husband Tobias' daughter Maeby. Each episode of the season follows a different character, with this episode focusing on George Sr. and his exploits with building a border between Mexico and the US.

== Plot ==
George Sr. (Jeffrey Tambor) attends an awards ceremony and political fundraiser to garner support for his project to build a border between the United States and Mexico and meets with politician Herbert Love (Terry Crews), who is running for a seat in the House of Representatives. Herbert tells George Sr. that he will he make the border a part of his three-point plan in exchange for a bribe. Meanwhile, Oscar, while impersonating George Sr., learns more about George's border plans from Lucille (Jessica Walter) after the two have sex. Lucille suggests sending Gob (Will Arnett) down to Mexico, and Oscar agrees. At the fundraiser, George Sr. tries to convince people to invest in his "Sweat and Squeeze" camp to try to get enough money to bribe Herbert with when he bumps into Lindsay (Portia de Rossi), who now has red hair. Lindsay complains that Lucille had sent Maeby (Alia Shawkat) a check for $50,000 for her to get plastic surgery. George Sr. takes the check, saying he'll use it for Maeby's trust fund, but he subsequently uses it to bribe Herbert.

The next day, Herbert Love endorses the border project on the news. George Sr. arrives at the border between the two countries, where he finds out that the "Sweat and Squeeze" had been erroneously been set up entirely in Mexico, instead of the US. George Sr. calls Barry (Henry Winkler), who advises him to ask Herbert to withdraw his endorsement, which George Sr. can't afford. Gob arrives at the border and accidentally lets loose hives of bees. George Sr. confronts Oscar about the misplacement of the "Sweat and Squeeze", to which Oscar responds that he will impersonate him. George Sr. goes to Doctor Norman (John Slattery) for pills to help his erectile dysfunction and is sent to Orange County Imaging, where he meets Michael (Jason Bateman). George Sr. signs Michael's release form to be portrayed in the film adaptation of the Bluths' lives (Note: As seen in "The B. Team.") on the condition that Michael gets Herbert to withdraw his endorsement of the border.

George Sr. visits Lucille, where he explains the situation, and she insists George Sr. give Gob a job, so he asks Michael to do it for him. At the model home, Michael runs into Gob, and after a few drinks, they talk about their romantic relationships. Meanwhile, George Sr. records a video of him and Buster (Tony Hale) driving around the supposedly built wall, when in actuality, they are driving in a circle. George Sr. goes to Cinco de Cuatro, where Lucille Austero (Liza Minnelli) complains about him donating money to Herbert's campaign when she is also running for a seat. George Sr. then sees Doctor Norman, who informs him that he has almost no testosterone but has high estrogen levels. Amid a riot from Hispanic people protesting the holiday, George Sr. puts on a red female wig. (Note: In the episode "Red Hairing", it is revealed that the wig previously belonged to Lindsay.)

=== On the next Arrested Development... ===
Lindsay visits Michael at Orange County Imaging. When questioned by the police about Lucille Austero's disappearance, George Sr. opens the door, still wearing the wig and living as a woman.

== Production ==
"Double Crossers" was directed by executive producer Troy Miller and series creator Mitchell Hurwitz, and written by co-executive producers Dean Lorey and Richard Rosenstock. It was Miller and Hurwitz's sixth directing credits, Lorey's fourth writing credit and Rosenstock's ninth writing credit.

The season's format is different compared to previous seasons, as each of the 15 episodes focus on one individual character, with every episode happening at the same time within the show's universe, showing the character's activities since the conclusion of the third season. "Double Crossers" was the fourth episode of the season to be filmed, and the second of two focusing on George Sr.

== Reception ==
Eric Goldman of IGN gave the episode an 8 out of 10, saying "Episode 6 did a relatively quick return to George Sr.’s story and thankfully, the results were stronger than in his first Season 4 appearance." Goldman praised the episode for its writing, which he called "certainly wittier" than in "Borderline Personalities", and Terry Crews' "likeable presence". The Guardian's Hadley Freeman criticized how the episode suffers from having "not enough time to let the characters, jokes and audience members breathe." Freeman then commented on the episode, and the season, as being "Pulp Fiction-like."

Noel Murray and Erik Adams of The A.V. Club gave the episode a C− grade. Murray criticized how the episode has "so much going on—and so much of it disconnected—that it almost feels like a dumping ground for all the season four story-chunks that are necessary for the overarching narrative but that don’t amount to a whole lot on their own." Adams stated that the episode "feels like a weigh station, a point for season four to pause, sort through the massive amount of story information it’s generated up to this point, determine what’s important, and then move forward." Nick Harley of Den of Geek gave the episode 3.5 stars out of five, stating that "The problem is that George’s storyline is one of the more convoluted and uninteresting threads running through the big, overall picture, but this time around he at least has some help livening things up." In 2019, Brian Tallerico from Vulture ranked the episode 78th out of the whole series, calling it "Another season-four misfire, but at least this one has a bit more of a developed plot, funny beats from Gob and Lucille".
