= Indian Takers =

- Arrested Development episode
- Episode no.: Season 4 Episode 3
- Directed by: Mitchell Hurwitz; Troy Miller
- Written by: Caroline Williams; Dean Lorey
- Cinematography by: Peter Lyons Collister
- Editing by: Kabir Akhtar; A.J. Dickerson
- Production code: 4AJD03
- Original air date: May 26, 2013
- Running time: 28 minutes

Guest appearances
- Henry Winkler as Barry Zuckerkorn; John Beard as himself; Ed Helms as James Carr; Kristen Wiig as Young Lucille Bluth; Chris Diamantopoulos as Marky Bark; Maria Bamford as Debrie Bardeaux

Episode chronology
← Previous "Borderline Personalities"	Next → "The B. Team"
- Arrested Development season 4

"Indian Takers" is the third episode of the fourth season of the American television satirical sitcom Arrested Development. It is the 56th overall episode of the series, and was written by supervising producer Caroline Williams and co-executive producer Dean Lorey, and directed by Mitchell Hurwitz and executive producer Troy Miller. It originally released on May 26, 2013, with the rest of the season, and was distributed by Netflix.

The series, narrated by Ron Howard, follows the Bluths, a formerly wealthy, dysfunctional family, who made their money from property development. The Bluth family consists of Michael, his adopted sister Lindsay, his older brother Gob, his younger brother Buster, their mother Lucille and father George Sr., as well as Michael's son George-Michael, and Lindsay and her husband Tobias' daughter Maeby. Each episode of the season follows a different character, with this episode focusing on Lindsay and her marital problems with Tobias.

== Plot ==
Many years ago, after the boat party, Lucille (Jessica Walter) insults Lindsay (Portia de Rossi) about her marriage to Tobias (David Cross), which causes Lindsay to view herself as a victim of the Bluth family rather than a part of it. However, Lindsay tells Tobias that she believes their marriage isn't working out and that they should get a divorce. After reading the "pray" section of Eat, Pray, Love, Lindsay is inspired to go on a spiritual trip to India. Once she arrives, she picks up the wrong luggage bag, causing her to go on a shopping spree, where she unknowingly buys counterfeit goods. Lindsay visits a shaman, who tells her that "love is where you left it". Lindsay returns to her hotel to find out that her credit card has been maxed out and turns around to see the shaman has disappeared. Lindsay calls Lucille for advice, and she tells Lindsay to reconcile with Tobias and attend her trial.

Back in Lucille's apartment, Lindsay reveals to Michael (Jason Bateman) that she will be testifying at Lucille's trial and has been bribed by Lucille into saying positive things about her. Lindsay and Tobias visit a realtor (Ed Helms) to purchase a new home together. They admit that they don't have any incoming revenue, but the realtor, eager to put them in as much debt as possible, offers them a large house, so they buy a mansion. Lucille gives Lindsay a script to read off at her trial, but Lindsay declines, saying the money doesn't matter to her anymore. Lucille convinces her otherwise. After the 2008 financial crisis, Lindsay tells Tobias that Lucille is refusing to pay her unless her testimony is believable. Lindsay and Tobias plan to go to a method acting class called Method One to improve her acting skills, but mistakenly attend a methadone clinic.

Lindsay runs into Marky Bark (Chris Diamantopoulos) and arranges for her and Tobias to go on a double with him and his girlfriend, Debrie Bardeaux (Maria Bamford). Lindsay, Tobias, Marky, and Debrie have lunch together at a restaurant. Lindsay and Marky, and Tobias and Debrie respectively bond. Marky tells Lindsay that he feels a strong connection between them, and Lindsay kisses him. They rush out of the restaurant to Marky's caravan to have sex. Marky tells Lindsay that he has face blindness and doesn't know what she looks like. Lindsay calls Tobias to tell him that their relationship is over, but she still cares about him. After another night of sex, Lindsay wakes up to find herself being attacked by an ostrich at Marky's farm, which he shares with his mother.

=== On the next Arrested Development... ===
Lindsay misses Lucille's trial and cuts her hair to try to look less attractive. Tobias, still thinking the methadone clinic is an acting class, continues to attend.

== Production ==
"Indian Takers" was directed by series creator Mitchell Hurwitz and executive producer Troy Miller, and written by supervising producer Caroline Williams and co-executive producer Dean Lorey. It was Hurwitz and Miller's third directing credits, Williams' first writing credit and Lorey's second writing credit.

The season's format is different compared to previous seasons, as each of the 15 episodes focus on one individual character, with every episode happening at the same time within the show's universe, showing the character's activities since the conclusion of the third season. "Indian Takers" was the fifth episode of the season to be filmed, and the first of two focusing on Lindsay.

== Reception ==
Eric Goldman of IGN gave the episode a 6.5 out of 10, saying:

"The second and third episodes of Arrested Development: Season 4 are the weakest of the batch, and unfortunately, I’d say this one “wins” out as my least favorite. In fact, “Indian Takers” is probably the least funny episode this series has ever delivered. There are a few scattered laughs and some amusing moments to be sure, but also a whole lot of “meh.”"

The Guardian's Hadley Freeman commented on the episode, saying that it "felt more Arrested, but [he's] still not loving the format of focusing on one character at a time." Noel Murray and Erik Adams of The A.V. Club gave the episode a "B" grade. Adams commented on how "The sensation that [he] got from “Indian Takers” and “The B. Team” is one of emptiness". In 2019, Brian Tallerico from Vulture ranked the episode 82nd out of the whole series, calling it "One of the worst episodes of Arrested Development", and saying "This is one you can truly skip."
