= Arrested Development season 5 =

Season of television series

Arrested Development
- Season 5
- Promotional poster
- Starring: Jason Bateman; Portia de Rossi; Will Arnett; Michael Cera; Alia Shawkat; Tony Hale; David Cross; Jeffrey Tambor; Jessica Walter
- No. of episodes: 16

Release
- Original network: Netflix
- Original release: Part 1: May 29, 2018; Part 2: March 15, 2019

Season chronology
- ← Previous; Season 4

The fifth and final season of the American television satirical sitcom series Arrested Development premiered on Netflix on May 29, 2018. The season consists of 16 episodes, split into two eight-episode parts; with the second half released on March 15, 2019. This is the second revival season after the series was canceled by Fox in 2006; the fourth season premiered in 2013.

The show's storyline centers on the Bluth family, a formerly wealthy, habitually dysfunctional family, and the show incorporates hand-held camera work, narration, archival photos and historical footage. One central storyline of the fifth season is a whodunit regarding the mysterious disappearance of Lucille Austero in the midst of her congressional campaign. The season also features the cast together more frequently, as the fourth season primarily had the cast separated due to scheduling difficulties.

== Development and production ==
On July 12, 2013, Netflix was in discussions for a fifth season. In August 2014, Netflix chief content officer Ted Sarandos stated in an interview with USA Today that there is a strong possibility of a fifth season. "It's just a matter of when." In April 2015, executive producer Brian Grazer confirmed that a fifth season was in development and would consist of 17 episodes. Jason Bateman contradicted this in February 2016, however, and said regarding a fifth season, "There is no plan. I haven't heard of anything solid going forward." However, in January 2017, Grazer again confirmed a fifth season plan, stating that all of the original series actors are on board for a new season, with an official deal expected to be made "within a couple of weeks".

Netflix confirmed on May 17, 2017, that a fifth season, featuring the full cast from the show, had been ordered and would be expected to be released on their service in 2018. Production began in August 2017, with 17 episodes planned for the fifth season. Filming wrapped in November 2017. Tambor had been the subject of sexual misconduct allegations in November 2017 which led to him being taken off Transparent; however, the allegations did not impact his inclusion in season 5. On May 7, 2018, it was announced that the fifth season would premiere on May 29, 2018, with the season's trailer being released. Portia de Rossi, who has retired from acting, only appears in five episodes of this season.

== Cast ==
=== Main ===
- Jason Bateman as Michael Bluth
- Portia de Rossi as Lindsay Bluth Fünke
- Will Arnett as Gob Bluth
- Michael Cera as George Michael Bluth
- Alia Shawkat as Maeby Fünke
- Tony Hale as Buster Bluth
- David Cross as Tobias Fünke
- Jeffrey Tambor as George Bluth, Sr. / Oscar Bluth
- Jessica Walter as Lucille Bluth

=== Recurring ===
- Ron Howard as Narrator / himself
- Justin Grant Wade as Steve Holt
- Ben Stiller as Tony Wonder
- Christine Taylor as Sally Sitwell
- Isla Fisher as Rebel Alley
- Maria Bamford as DeBrie Bardeaux
- Martin Mull as Gene Parmesan
- Judy Greer as Kitty Sanchez
- Henry Winkler as Barry Zuckerkorn
- Ed Begley Jr. as Stan Sitwell
- James Lipton as Warden Gentles
- John Beard as himself
- Rebecca Drysdale as Lieutenant Toddler
- Kyle Mooney as Murphy-Brown
- Lauren Weedman as Joni Beard

=== Guest stars ===
- Frances Conroy as Lottie Dottie
- Dermot Mulroney as Dusty
- Gilbert Gottfried as infomercial narrator
- Cheryl Howard as herself
- Bryce Dallas Howard as herself
- Paige Howard as herself
- Rance Howard as himself
- Alan Tudyk as Pastor Veal
- Taran Killam as himself playing a young George Sr.
- Cobie Smulders as herself playing a young Lucille
- Jean Smart as herself playing Mimi
- Steele Stebbins as himself playing a young Michael
- Thomas Barbusca as himself playing a young Gob
- Owen Vaccaro as himself playing a young Buster
- Savannah Kennick as herself playing a young Lindsay

== Marketing and promotion ==
On May 7, 2018, the fifth season's trailer was released. To promote the season, two versions of the Bluth Real Estate stair car, featuring the hashtag #AD5 and the website voteBLUTH.com, were driven around New York City and Los Angeles.

== Episodes ==
No. overall	No. in season	Title	Directed by	Written by	Original release date	Prod. code
Part 1
69	1	"Family Leave"	Troy Miller	Mitchell Hurwitz & Jim Vallely	May 29, 2018	5AJD01
After Gob forced Michael to take a Forget-Me-Now on Cinco de Cuatro, Michael sleeps for two whole days, after which he goes to break up with Rebel, only to encounter his son George-Michael, who punches him after discovering Michael knew George-Michael was dating the same woman. Michael then returns to the penthouse, while attempting to avoid Lucille 2, who he does not know is missing. Michael is met by Lt. Toddler of the Newport Beach PD, who questions him about the whereabouts of Lucille, Lucille 2, and the red-haired woman from the penthouse the day prior (George Sr. in a wig). As a way to get back at his family, Michael schemes to get Buster, who is hiding after being named a suspect in Lucille 2's disappearance, declared a missing person. Meanwhile, George-Michael regrets punching Michael, and confides this in Maeby, who is trying to flee after being discovered as a (accidental) sex-offender, and Lucille persuades Tobias to break her out of Austerity with Lucille 2 missing, and the two flee to a beachside cottage.
70	2	"Self-Deportation"	Troy Miller	Richard Day	May 29, 2018	5AJD02
Maeby and George-Michael go down to Mexico, where Maeby joins a group of Mexican volunteers, while George-Michael joins a group of fellow University of California, Irvine students who are living in Mexico for an intensive language course. Michael, after getting Buster to agree to the scheme, attempts to flee to Mexico in the mapping car, but he is located by the search engine company he is driving for. Michael is taken back to the company's campus, where he begins to work and live. A month later, Michael returns to the model home for a scuba suit, where he finds a letter from Lucille 2, who has forgiven Michael's $700,000 debt. He goes to the penthouse, which he finds empty, but upon entering Lucille 2's penthouse to thank her, Michael finds Lucille, George Sr, Lindsay, Gob, Tobias, and Maeby all there.
71	3	"Everyone Gets Atrophy"	Troy Miller	Mitchell Hurwitz	May 29, 2018	5AJD03
Michael learns that Lindsay is running for Congress, filling Herbert Love's spot, with Lucille calling the family together so they can accept the Family of the Year award, which is awarded by the Austero-Bluth Company, in order to give Lindsay a boost in the polls. George-Michael returns to Newport Beach, where he is called by Maeby, who is working as Lindsay's campaign manager. Maeby explains that she has been trying to make Lindsay say offensive things to sabotage her campaign, but her efforts have backfired; she wants George-Michael and her to kiss to sabotage Lindsay's campaign further. Buster is arrested after being found by the police and being identified in the security footage on the night of Cinco de Cuatro.
72	4	"An Old Start"	Troy Miller	Jim Vallely	May 29, 2018	5AJD04
With Lucille 2 not around, Gob is named president of the Austero-Bluth Company. George-Michael meets Maeby at a senior living community where she is squatting in a room owned by Lucille Austero for trysts with Stan Sitwell. They discuss George-Michael and Michael's ended relationships with Rebel and George-Michael's relationship with Michael. Michael returns to the family cottage where his wife died, finding Lucille there, learning that, contrary to Michael's belief, Lucille and George Sr. did not sell the cottage after his wife's death, per Michael's wishes.
73	5	"Sinking Feelings"	Troy Miller	Jim Vallely & Mitchell Hurwitz	May 29, 2018	5AJD05
The Bluths prepare to receive their award in a ceremony by the Banana Stand, even though the Banana Stand is missing. George-Michael goes to break up with Rebel, but the circumstances prevent him from doing so. George-Michael catches Michael before Michael's scuba diving trip, and the two reconcile. The award ceremony goes awry, with Gob giving an awkward speech and Lindsay walking out after realizing Lucille does not truly care for her. George Sr. winds up in the ocean, but Michael and George-Michael save him. Michael discovers that Buster is in prison, revealing this and his scheme to Lucille and George Sr., after which Lucille punches Michael. Michael meets with Buster in jail, learning that Buster attempted to wipe the footage of him with Lucille's body from Cinco. Michael calls Barry Zuckerkorn, the family attorney, to pay off Buster's bail. Tobias reveals an actor the family had paid to actually be his bastard son, Murphy-Brown. At a welcome home party, the Bluths discover that Michael bailed out Barry, who was also in jail, and not Buster.
74	6	"Emotional Baggage"	Troy Miller	Evan Mann & Gareth Reynolds	May 29, 2018	5AJD06
Gob attempts to get the rights to Buster back from Kitty, but is unable to do so. George-Michael is invited by Rebel to a Howard family barbecue, and has Maeby dye his hair pink to make a bad impression. However, the dye is left in too long, leaving his hair "Howard Red", making a strong impression on Ron. Michael sneaks into the barbecue to get the rights from Ron, but is also unable to do so. After learning from Bryce Dallas Howard that Rebel is using George-Michael, and after a conversation with Rance Howard about keeping an eye on your son, Michael allows the Bluth project to move forward as a streaming, true crime series. Ron sets up an interview with Buster, but after remembering a conversation with George Sr., Buster attacks Ron, believing him to be a skinhead.
75	7	"Rom-Traum"	Troy Miller	Maggie Rowe	May 29, 2018	5ADJ07
Michael theorizes that Lucille might know the location of Lucille 2, and he, Barry, and Buster plan to make her believe the district attorney is on to Lucille. This backfires, with Lucille, realizing the scheme. Barry shows Lucille the evidence picture of the stair car, and she tasks him with locating it. George Sr. leaves the cottage, with a suspicious Michael following him. George-Michael, who after a speculative comment from Maeby that Michael may have been with Rebel in Mexico during the two months she was shooting a movie, becomes suspicious of Michael and follows him. Barry also follows, in order to search for Lucille 2 with George Sr. Michael meets with George Sr., where they learn from Tobias, who was searching for Lindsay, that George's lack of sex drive was due to Lucille tricking him into taking estrogen pills. After seeing Lucille 2's car (which George-Michael drives, unbeknownst to Michael), Michael and Tobias chase after George-Michael, with George Sr. and Barry following behind. All three vehicles hit spike strips, after which the five in the vehicles are confronted by a group of cowboys, who now own the land due to Tobias, who was impersonating George Sr, signing ownership to them.
76	8	"Premature Independence"	Troy Miller	Mitchell Hurwitz & Jim Vallely	May 29, 2018	5ADJ08
On the night of the Second of July Parade (a local holiday), Lindsay has yet to be found, a situation which Sally Sitwell, who has taken Lucille 2's place in the congressional race, tries to exploit. Michael discovers the evidence picture, which shows Lucille 2 and Oscar in the stair car. However, George-Michael discovers the picture, revealing it was actually him and Maeby in the picture, taken when they went down to Mexico earlier. At the parade, Michael shows the picture to Lottie Dottie, the district attorney. George-Michael then arrives to show Michael the picture, where Michael realizes his mistake. Gob and Tony Wonder perform on a float for a closet company, where they discuss their relationship; however, the conversation abruptly ends when Tony is suddenly and mysteriously cased into his closet on the float with cement. Tobias, unable to find Lindsay, enlists his old flame DeBrie to impersonate Lindsay. George Sr. arrives at the parade, telling Lucille that the cowboys now own the land. Lucille and George both recognize that this prevents their plan to build a wall across the Mexican-American Border and they need Lindsay to lose the election; luckily for Lucille, DeBrie, shy, hides under a sheet, which the public takes to be a show of anti-Muslim sentiments. Buster, who is in a parade float, is broken out by Oscar, who escapes in Sally's new stair car, despite the fact that Buster only has eight days left in prison.
Part 2
77	9	"Unexpected Company"	Troy Miller	Hallie Cantor	March 15, 2019	5AJD09
Buster misses his own prison release party, revealing that he is on the run with Oscar. While searching for a new prosthetic hand, they meet Stan Sitwell in the hospital and take him hostage. Gob, distraught by the possible loss of Tony Wonder, worries that his homosexuality induced by the botched closet illusion will be permanent. As Rebel is now investing in the fake company Fakeblock, George-Michael asks for the help of paid protesters to dissuade her from visiting the headquarters. His plan is to hire members of Anonymous wearing Guy Fawkes masks but Gob thinks he is referring to "foxy" males. The protesters throw a party when Rebel arrives which increases her interest in the company. Meanwhile Michael, after learning that he is a co-president of the Bluth company, catches his father in a suicide attempt provoked by Lucille's relationship with a surfer named Dustin Radler. Looking at the financial records, Michael sees that Gob has purchased a 3D dental printer.
78	10	"Taste Makers"	Troy Miller	Mitchell Hurwitz	March 15, 2019	5AJD10
Stan Sitwell takes Oscar and Buster to Lucille 2's apartment. They blow Maeby's cover prompting her to hit Stan over the head which hospitalizes him again. Michael tries to spend more time with George-Michael and discusses a "gated community" file that his parents had tried to 3D print. George-Michael seeks a clueless president to oversee the employees who still work for Fakeblock due to Maeby firing them in the wrong order. The president turns out to be Gob who receives a threat from the Gay Mafia led by Lucille 2's brother. The group tells Gob that, since he has started to live a gay life to preserve the magician's code, any attempt by him to end it before seven years will send a message that conversion therapy works. They task Gob with disposing of a body implied to be Tony Wonder's.
79	11	"Chain Migration"	Troy Miller	Richard Day	March 15, 2019	5AJD11
George Sr. tries to impress Lucille by helping her search for Buster in the mall. Oscar and Buster arrive at the tent store where Tobias and his makeshift family are squatting only to find out that the chain holding them together was unlocked the entire time. Now able to walk on his own, Oscar runs into his twin who tells him that he should keep pretending to be on a prison break with Buster so that Lucille can become happy with her marriage again. After the tent store closes, the Fünkes move in with Maeby while Oscar and Buster move into the model home. Gob tells Buster that their prison break is a sham but offers to let him keep bonding with Oscar if he disposes of a body bag. Meanwhile, Michael confronts George Sr. and Lucille about their "gated community" file being plans for a U.S. / Mexico border wall which they had promised to a Chinese company.
80	12	"Check Mates"	Troy Miller	Evan Mann & Gareth Reynolds	March 15, 2019	5AJD12
Oscar and Buster confess that each has been trying to spend time with the other under false pretences. Oscar runs away when Buster tries to make him give up marijuana. George Sr. and Lucille meet the Chinese investors and tell them that their money is gone due to an accidental purchase of land owned by the Mexican Romney family. In exchange for their honesty, they receive $3 million which Dusty tells them is a loan to help them save face. Michael finds this money, laundered as coming from the banana stand, which he uses to buy Fakeblock thinking that it will rekindle his son's interest in the company. When it does the opposite, Gob arrives with Buster who is promptly re-arrested on suspicion of having dumped a body into the ocean.
81	13	"The Untethered Sole"	Troy Miller	Chris Marrs	March 15, 2019	5AJD13
The Bluths meet at the police station where Buster is charged with first degree murder based on a video of him in the background of a weather report. Barry recommends an elite team of lawyers called the Guilty Guys. To help pay for them and placate the investors, Michael pretends that his purchase of Fakeblock was a commitment to build the wall by announcing a venture that combines border security with Internet security. Despite not being told about it, Gob crashes the groundbreaking ceremony and announces a much shorter completion timeline than Michael had intended. George-Michael fires his father after berating him for giving the company a contract it cannot possibly fulfill.
82	14	"Saving for Arraignment Day"	Troy Miller	Hallie Cantor	March 15, 2019	5AJD14
The Guilty Guys find themselves out of their depth, with their entire operation designed to secure slightly shorter sentences in the event of a guilty plea. Barry reveals that the only lawyer known to have beaten Lottie Dottie is her ex-husband Dustin Radler. Lucille tells Dusty she is willing to leave George for him if he goes back to practising law. Dusty agrees to help but continues to sleep at his own home which Lucille learns is worth millions of dollars. Meanwhile, to create a distraction from the fake nature of Fakeblock, George-Michael arranges for Gob to give a magic show at the wall unveiling.
83	15	"Courting Disasters"	Troy Miller	Mitchell Hurwitz & Jim Vallely	March 15, 2019	5AJD15
George and Lucille learn that the lawyer they hoped to get was the critically ill Dustin Radler Sr. and that the incompetent Dusty, who looks to Lucille as a maternal figure, is Lottie Dottie's stepson. At the model home, George-Michael tells Michael that he has been lying about dating Rebel and having a working Fakeblock product. Having kicked Maeby out of the senior's home shortly before being kicked out himself, Tobias meets George-Michael at the Fakeblock headquarters. Murphy Brown tells the group that he is a programmer who can finish the code. Back in the courtroom, Lottie Dottie convinces the jury that Buster has killed before by playing production footage of the Bluth crime series. The clip shows a reenactment of Buster pushing his grandmother down the stairs after hearing her state that one of the Bluth children is adopted.
84	16	"The Fallout"	Troy Miller	Mitchell Hurwitz	March 15, 2019	5AJD16
When questions about his own role in the body dumping are raised, Gob tells the jurors that Buster is a schemer and that they are right to be suspicious of him. Michael overhears Lucille advising Dusty to destroy evidence that implicates her in the murder of Buster's grandmother Mimi. The video, which Michael intercepts, shows Lucille coaching Buster on how to take the blame for her. When confronted on the stand, Lucille's harsh words restore some of Michael's lost memories of Cinco. Combined with the recent discovery that Lucille 2's messages to him were prerecorded, this convinces Michael that he is guilty of the murder for which Buster is being tried. Lucille chastises Michael for making this confession after the court gets out. She reveals that the video of a plot to supposedly cover up her crime was itself a plot to cover up Buster's crime and that her whispered advice to Dusty was designed to be overheard. Nevertheless, a mistrial is declared. With Buster free, the Bluths gather at the border to unveil a wall being picketed by protesters. One of them is Lindsay whom Lucille embraces as her half sister whom she adopted to raise as her daughter. Gob seizes on the chance to go back to leading a straight life without angering the Gay Mafia and stages a continuation of the closet illusion with Buster as his assistant. Gob disappears and tells the audience members he is inside the wall just as cement is poured between the two layers. George-Michael tells Chinese businessmen that Gob's incapacitation gives him the right to license Fakeblock to them. Michael objects and gets into a fist fight with his son. Being third in the line of succession, this gives him the right to sell the company when George-Michael becomes incapacitated as well. George-Michael gets up afterwards and thanks his father for going along with the plan to increase the valuation of the company by portraying it as significant enough to trigger a father-son fight. When Michael breaks the news, he remembers more from May 5 including the fact that he never killed Lucille 2. Gob's illusion ends by revealing that neither he nor Tony Wonder had ever been encased in cement. Gob's stories about Buster's malice are proven correct when construction workers arrive to retrieve what they think is a mannequin and instead find Lucille Austero's body.

== Reception ==
Many critics said the season was more in line with the original Fox episodes and that having the ensemble back together after previously separating them benefited the season. On Rotten Tomatoes, it holds an approval rating of 55% with an average score of 5.1/10, based on 53 reviews. The site's critical consensus reads, "Arrested Development finds itself back in familiar form, recapturing much of the cast's chemistry and comedic brilliance—though it still doesn't quite live up to its own past." On Metacritic, the season has a weighted average score of 67 out of 100, based on 20 critics, indicating "generally favorable" reviews.

Ben Travers of IndieWire gave it a positive review with a "B" grade, calling it a big improvement over season four. He wrote, "With the cast reunited and a better understanding of what made the characters lovable lunkheads to begin with, the new season can be effortlessly enjoyable; a pleasure to watch instead of something you have to dig through to find the parts you love." Sonya Saraiya of Vanity Fair praised it for returning to "the show you remember," claiming it to be far superior to the fourth season. She singles out Arnett's performance in particular, praising him as "magnificent." Caroline Framke of Variety also praised the new season for acknowledging and correcting some of the mistakes of the fourth season instead of ignoring them, while also highlighting the ability of the show to engage in character development after 15 years with regards to Cera and Shawkat's characters. She too praised Arnett as the standout of the cast. Tim Goodman of The Hollywood Reporter argued that the second Netflix season was "much, much better," than the first, believing that once the show "hits its stride, it evokes its glory days," overall being a "welcome return to form".
