= Colony Collapse (Arrested Development) =

- Arrested Development episode
- Episode no.: Season 4 Episode 7
- Directed by: Troy Miller; Mitchell Hurwitz
- Written by: Mitchell Hurwitz; Jim Vallely
- Cinematography by: Peter Lyons Collister
- Editing by: Kabir Akhtar; A.J. Dickerson
- Production code: 4AJD08
- Original air date: May 26, 2013
- Running time: 35 minutes

Guest appearances
- Henry Winkler as Barry Zuckerkorn; Ben Schwartz as John Beard Jr.; Mae Whitman as Ann Veal; John Beard as himself; Andy Richter as himself; Jeff Garlin as Mort Meyers; Isla Fisher as Rebel Alley; Ben Stiller as Tony Wonder; Alan Tudyk as Pastor Veal; Ione Skye as Mrs. Veal; Peter Jason as Storage Dave; Maria Bamford as Debrie Bardeaux; Daniel Amerman as Mark Cherry; Wyatt Russell as Oakwood; Justin Grant Wade as Steve Holt; Clint Howard as Johnny Bark

Episode chronology
← Previous "Double Crossers"	Next → "Red Hairing"
- Arrested Development season 4

"Colony Collapse" is the seventh episode of the fourth season of the American television satirical sitcom Arrested Development. It is the 60th overall episode of the series, and was written by series creator Mitchell Hurwitz and executive producer Jim Vallely, and directed by executive producer Troy Miller and Hurwitz. It originally released on May 26, 2013 with the rest of the season, and was distributed by Netflix. The episode was positively received, with particular praise for Will Arnett's portrayal of Gob.

The series, narrated by Ron Howard, follows the Bluths, a formerly wealthy, dysfunctional family, who made their money from property development. The Bluth family consists of Michael, his adopted sister Lindsay, his older brother Gob, his younger brother Buster, their mother Lucille and father George Sr., as well as Michael's son George-Michael, and Lindsay and her husband Tobias' daughter Maeby. Each episode of the season follows a different character, with this episode focusing on Gob reconnecting with Steve Holt after almost marrying Ann Veal.

== Plot ==
Gob (Will Arnett) exits a limousine on Hollywood Boulevard with a group of young and famous men. Years earlier, Gob is punched by George-Michael (Michael Cera) after finding out he is dating Ann Veal (Mae Whitman), (Note: As seen in "Development Arrested.") after which she tells Gob that he has to make things right with George Michael. Gob tries to reconcile with George Michael by tricking him into saying that he is okay with Gob dating Ann. Scared of having to commit to Ann, Gob breaks into her house to break up with her, but Ann seduces Gob, and they have sex. The next morning, Gob tries to break up with Ann, but instead breaks down and accidentally proposes to her, who accepts. At Lucille's (Jessica Walter) apartment, Gob announces to Michael (Jason Bateman) that he and Ann are getting married.

On a Christian talk show, Gob and Ann are interviewed by Ann's father (Alan Tudyk). Gob states that he would like to televise their marriage on the show and announces that he will perform a magic show during the wedding. Gob asks Michael to be his best man for the wedding, but Michael declines. On the day of the wedding, none of the members of the Bluth family attend. Tobias (David Cross) arrives, explaining he had been unknowingly cast as part of Gob's act. The wedding begins with Gob's magical act, where he is dressed as Jesus on a cross. Gob is handcuffed and announces he is going to lock himself inside a fake cave for two weeks, but he fails to access the keys to his handcuffs and is knocked unconscious and trapped. After being trapped for eleven days, Gob's fake boulder is taken to a storage unit, and Gob misses Lucille's trial. Once the two weeks are over, the fake cave is opened, and the crowd sees Gob is missing. Gob is eventually found and taken to the hospital, where Ann tells Gob she is leaving him.

Once out of the hospital, Gob calls Steve Holt (Justin Grant Wade), and the two meet at a bar. Steve offers Gob to work with him in pest control, and Gob accepts. Gob then meets John Beard Jr. (Ben Schwartz), Mark Cherry (Daniel Amerman), and Rebel Alley (Isla Fisher). After Gob helps them escape from the paparazzi, he is invited to join them in partying as their getaway driver. For the next few months, Gob continues partying and uses rohypnol pills to make him forget his shame. Gob visits his bee-business partner Johnny Bark (Clint Howard) and picks up a box of bees. Sensing Mark Cherry is growing tired of him, Gob drives Mark and his friends around in the limousine and picks up a group of young women, including DeBrie Bardeaux (Maria Bamford). DeBrie opens a divider in the limo and accidentally lets all the bees out. Days later at an awards ceremony, Gob notices his old rival Tony Wonder (Ben Stiller) is performing and locks the box he expects Tony to appear from. (Note: It is revealed in the following episode "Red Hairing" that Marky Bark (Chris Diamantopoulos) had been inside the box, not Tony Wonder.)

=== On the next Arrested Development... ===
Gob gets a call from Lucille, who tells him that George Sr. (Jeffrey Tambor) wants Gob to become president of the Bluth Company. After Gob accidentally lets his bees escape at George Sr.'s "Sweat & Squeeze", (Note: As seen in the previous episode "Double Crossers".) Gob finds the fake cave he used for his magic act and discovers the hatch he needed to get the keys to his handcuffs was locked.

== Production ==
"Colony Collapse" was directed by executive producer Troy Miller and series creator Mitchell Hurwitz, and written by Hurwitz and executive producer Jim Vallely. It was Miller's seventh directing credit, Hurwitz's seventh directing and 21st writing credit, and Vallely's 19th writing credit.

The season's format is different compared to previous seasons, as each of the 15 episodes focus on one individual character, with every episode happening at the same time within the show's universe, showing the character's activities since the conclusion of the third season. "Colony Collapse" was the eighth episode of the season to be filmed, and the first of two focusing on Gob.

== Reception ==
Upon release, "Colony Collapse" received significant "buzz" from viewers, and was one of the most heavily-discussed episodes of the season. The episode was positively received, with particular praise for Will Arnett's portrayal of Gob. Eric Goldman of IGN gave the episode a 9 out of 10, calling it "Easily the best episode up to this point of Season 4 (and, in retrospect, one of Season 4's best episodes, period)". Goldman criticized the pacing, calling it "less consistent once the whole Gob/Ann storyline ended". He called the episode "a big success". The Guardian's Hadley Freeman praised the episode, stating "Will Arnett rarely disappoints." Freeman called the episode one she "would happily watch again and again." Noel Murray and Erik Adams of The A.V. Club gave the episode an A− grade. Murray praised the episode, saying "it definitely does" live "up to the hype". Chris Longo of Den of Geek gave the episode 4.5 stars out of five, stating that "it takes the right character and the right script to reward an actor’s effort", and praised Arnett's portrayal of Gob. In 2019, Brian Tallerico from Vulture ranked the episode 27th out of the whole series, calling it "The best episode of season four".
