= Flight of the Phoenix (Arrested Development) =

- Arrested Development episode
- Seth Rogen (right) and Kristen Wiig (left) portray a young George Bluth, Sr. and Lucille, respectively.
- Episode no.: Season 4 Episode 1
- Directed by: Mitchell Hurwitz; Troy Miller
- Written by: Mitchell Hurwitz
- Cinematography by: Peter Lyons Collister
- Editing by: Kabir Akhtar; A. J. Dickerson
- Production code: 4AJD01
- Original air date: May 26, 2013
- Running time: 32 minutes

Guest appearances
- Henry Winkler as Barry Zuckerkorn; Kristen Wiig as Young Lucille Bluth; Seth Rogen as Young George Bluth; Christine Taylor as Sally Sitwell; Ed Begley, Jr. as Stan Sitwell; John Beard as himself; Liza Minnelli as Lucille Austero; Adam DeVine as Starsky; Blake Anderson as B. Lake; Anders Holm as Supervisor Spoon

Episode chronology
← Previous "Development Arrested"	Next → "Borderline Personalities"
- Arrested Development season 4

"Flight of the Phoenix", also known as "Michael Part 1", is the fourth season premiere of the American television satirical sitcom Arrested Development. It originally premiered, along with the rest of the season, on May 26, 2013, and was distributed by Netflix. It was written by series creator Mitchell Hurwitz, and directed by Hurwitz and executive producer Troy Miller. Each episode of the season follows a different character, with "Flight of the Phoenix" focusing on series protagonist Michael as he moves in with his son, George-Michael, at UC Irvine.

Arrested Development had been cancelled in 2006 due to low ratings, but was renewed for another season by Netflix in 2011. It was the first episode of the series to air after "Development Arrested", the original finale. The episode, along with the rest of the season, was re-edited in 2018 for Season 4 Remix: Fateful Consequences, which garnered negative reception.

The series, narrated by Ron Howard, follows the Bluths, a formerly wealthy, dysfunctional family, who made their money from property development. The Bluth family consists of Michael, his adopted sister Lindsay, his older brother Gob, his younger brother Buster, their mother Lucille and father George Sr., as well as Michael's son George-Michael, and Lindsay and her husband Tobias' daughter Maeby. "Flight of the Phoenix" received mixed reviews from critics, with one calling the episode "extraordinary", and another calling it "overly long". Despite the lukewarm reception, the episode received several award nominations. It earned Jason Bateman a Creative Arts Emmy Award nomination for Outstanding Lead Actor in a Comedy Series.

== Plot ==
In a semi-rhyming parody of How the Grinch Stole Christmas!, a young Lucille (Kristen Wiig) and George Bluth, Sr. (Seth Rogen) start a new Cinco de Mayo-like celebration, "Cinco de Cuatro", in order to ruin the actual holiday out of spite. In the present day, Michael Bluth, drunk and indebted to the Bluth family's close friend Lucille 2, offers to have sex with her in a bid to have his debt remitted. Unsuccessful, Michael returns to the model home in Sudden Valley, where he runs into his brother Gob, and reacts with shock when he sees that Gob had sex with a deliberately unnamed woman. Gob panics, overpowers Michael, and forces him to take a rohypnol pill.

Five years prior, after the boat party, Michael returns to the family following his mother's arrest. But when he learns that his parents had received economic stimulus money and once again have embezzled it, he attempts to finally disassociate himself from the family by selling his stock to Lucille 2. He also decides to build houses at Sudden Valley under his own company, Michael B., despite numerous construction issues. Due to a housing crisis, Michael is unable to find buyers and can no longer afford the houses, winding up moving into a ghost town. After the death of a mailman, his only friend, Michael moves in with his son George Michael at UC Irvine. George Michael is occupied with the development of what he describes to his dad as privacy-enforcing software, along with his roommate, Paul "P-Hound" Huan.

Uncomfortable with the presence of his father and his loss of privacy, George Michael repeatedly tries to suggest to Michael that he should move out. Michael mistakenly believes that George Michael is instead trying to get rid of P-Hound, and arranges a four-person silent vote by George Michael, a visiting cousin Maeby, P-Hound, and himself to decide who must leave. Michael is saddened to discover that he has been unanimously voted out. Depressed, he tries to take solace in his featured appearance in Altitude, Outwest Airlines' in-flight magazine. The staff at the counter refuse to give Michael a copy of the magazine, which is reserved for plane passengers. Michael then buys a plane ticket to Phoenix, Arizona in order to see the magazine; opening it, he finds an unflattering photo of himself, finally realizing he has boarded a plane to an unknown location.

== Production and development ==
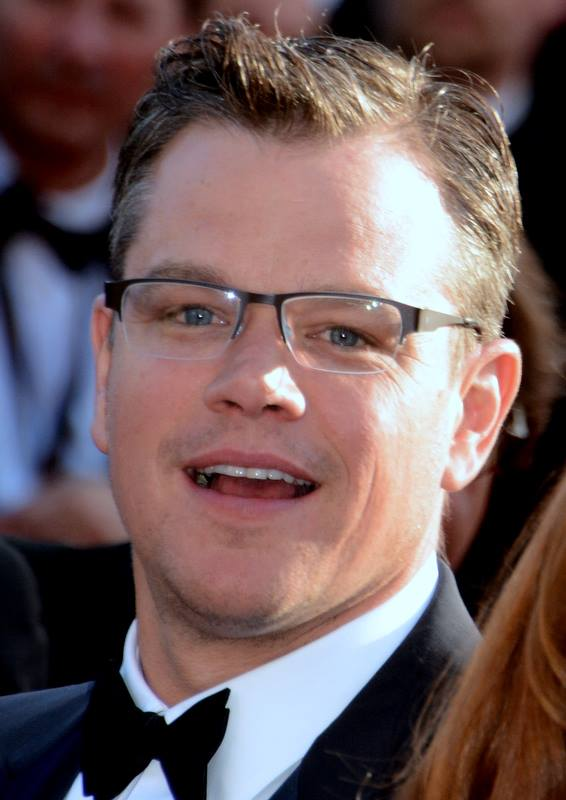
Matt Damon expressed high interest in portraying Michael in the cancelled film adaptation.

In 2006, Fox had cancelled Arrested Development due to low ratings, starting rumors of the series switching networks to Showtime. Creator Mitchell Hurwitz declined such offers, saying he had "told the story [he] wanted to tell". However, he expressed interest in continuing the series in a non-weekly-series format, feeling he'd "creatively exhausted" his original vision. Hurwitz originally planned on creating a feature film to follow up the series, which he co-wrote with Jim Vallely. The movie was hinted at in "Development Arrested", the series' original finale. In the episode, Maeby pitches a television series to Ron Howard, who instead suggests they make a movie out of the concept. The film would've been a "meta-movie", showcasing an in-universe film adaptation of the Bluth family's story that would see different actors portraying them. This idea was later utilized throughout the season, with a fictitious movie produced about the Bluth family playing a major focus. Matt Damon auditioned for the movie, wishing to play Michael. Damon, a fan of the series, asked Jason Bateman for his blessing to play the character, but plans for the films fell through, and Bateman said in 2021, following Jessica Walter's death, that he assumes it was scrapped.

After its original broadcast on Fox, the series became popular through DVDs and eventually Netflix, creating further interest in a potential revival. Rumors began to emerge in 2011 of Netflix reviving the series. In November of that year, Netflix officially signed a deal with 20th Century Television and Imagine Television to create another ten episode season of Arrested Development for early 2013. Ted Sarandos, chief content officer at Netflix, expressing his excitement over the deal, said "Arrested Development is one of the finest American comedies in TV history and its return through Netflix is a perfect example of how we are working closely with studios and networks to provide consumers with entertainment they love".

"Flight of the Phoenix" was directed by series creator Mitchell Hurwitz and executive producer Troy Miller, and written by Hurwitz. The season's format is different compared to previous seasons, as each of the 15 episodes focus on one individual character, with every episode happening at the same time within the show's universe, showing the character's activities since the conclusion of the third season. "Flight of the Phoenix" was the first episode of the season to be filmed, and the first of two focusing on Michael. The season was filmed on the same lot as the series' original run, which Hurwitz described as a "small studio lot". The episode, along with the rest of the season, was written as an "outgrowth of the design of what [could] be the movie".

=== Season 4 re-edit ===
In May 2018, a re-edit of the season, entitled Season 4 Remix: Fateful Consequences, was released onto Netflix. The edit, which was originally announced in October 2014, put the season in chronological order.

== Reception ==
=== Critical reception ===
Eric Goldman of IGN gave the episode a 7.8 out of 10, noting the novelty of seeing the characters again after a long period of time, but said the episode, particularly the dorm storyline, felt overly long and lost steam toward its end. The Guardian's Hadley Freeman called the episode "a rather depressing kick-off", referring to Michael Bluth's desolate state throughout the episode, but noticed that it was "extraordinary how much Hurwitz packs into each 30 minute episode."

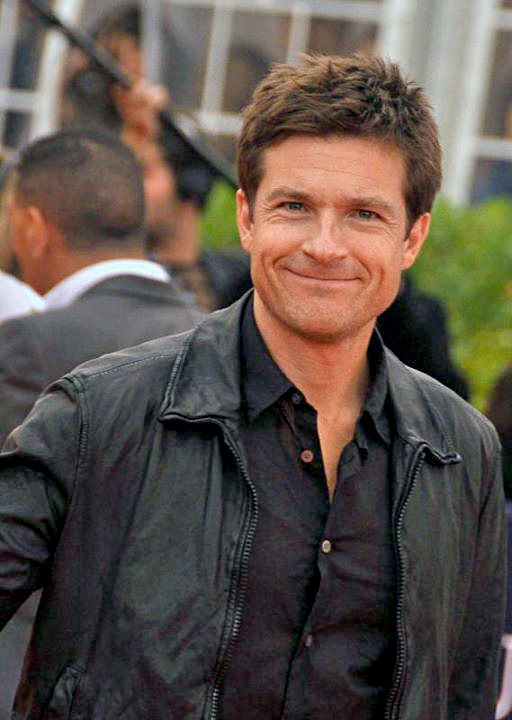
Jason Bateman's performance was highlighted by Vulture critic Brian Tallerico as "wonderful".

Noel Murray of The A.V. Club gave the episode a "B+" grade, calling the dorm vote sequence "the funniest in the whole of Arrested Development to date", and opined that the relaunched show "is a sitcom that's still pretty much clicking." In 2019, Brian Tallerico from Vulture ranked the episode 43rd out of the 76 episodes released by then, calling the return of Jason Bateman and Michael Cera "wonderful".

=== Re-edit controversy ===
The Fateful Consequences re-edit of "Flight of the Phoenix", along with the rest of the season, received overwhelmingly negative reception from critics. Daniel Schroeder of Slate gave it a negative review, calling it "terrible" and criticizing its overuse of the series' signature narration. Schroeder called the season an "idiot's guide" to the humor of Mitchell Hurwitz. Kathryn VanArendonk of Vulture said she understood the reasoning behind the re-edit, and said it made the season more similar to the series' original run. VanArendonk did call it "particularly unnerving" for being in "direct response" to the mixed reception of the season. On Rotten Tomatoes, the re-edit holds an approval rating of 25% with an average score of 5.3/10, based on 12 reviews. The site's critical consensus reads, "They've made a huge mistake".

=== Accolades ===
For the 65th Primetime Creative Arts Emmy Awards, "Flight of the Phoenix" was honored with two Primetime Emmy Award nominations for Outstanding Single-Camera Picture Editing for a Comedy Series and Outstanding Music Composition for a Series. Additionally, for the 65th Primetime Emmy Awards, Jason Bateman was nominated for Outstanding Lead Actor in a Comedy Series for the episode. Kabir Akhtar and A.J. Dickerson were also nominated for Best Edited Half-Hour Series for Television at the 2014 American Cinema Editors Award for the episode. Jason Tregoe Newman was nominated for Best Sound Editing in Television – Short Form: Music at the 2014 Golden Reel Award.
