= Borderline Personalities =

- Arrested Development episode
- Episode no.: Season 4 Episode 2
- Directed by: Mitchell Hurwitz; Troy Miller
- Written by: Jim Vallely; Richard Rosenstock
- Cinematography by: Peter Lyons Collister
- Editing by: Kabir Akhtar; A.J. Dickerson
- Production code: 4AJD03
- Original air date: May 26, 2013
- Running time: 28 minutes

Guest appearances
- Henry Winkler as Barry Zuckerkorn; Kristen Wiig as Young Lucille Bluth; Seth Rogen as Young George Bluth; John Beard as himself; Ed Begley, Jr. as Stan Sitwell; John Slattery as Doctor Norman; Mary Lynn Rajskub as Heartfire; Allan Wasserman as Herb Zuckerkorn; Karen Maruyama as China Garden; Max Winkler as Young Barry Zuckerkorn; Dan Harmon as Yurt Clerk

Episode chronology
← Previous "Flight of the Phoenix"	Next → "Indian Takers"
- Arrested Development season 4

"Borderline Personalities" is the second episode of the fourth season of the American television satirical sitcom Arrested Development. It is the 55th overall episode of the series, and was written by executive producer Jim Vallely and co-executive producer Richard Rosenstock, and directed by Mitchell Hurwitz and executive producer Troy Miller. It originally released on May 26, 2013 with the rest of the season, and was distributed by Netflix.

The series, narrated by Ron Howard, follows the Bluths, a formerly wealthy, dysfunctional family, who made their money from property development. The Bluth family consists of Michael, his adopted sister Lindsay, his older brother Gob, his younger brother Buster, their mother Lucille and father George Sr., as well as Michael's son George-Michael, and Lindsay and her husband Tobias' daughter Maeby. Each episode of the season follows a different character, with this episode focusing on George Sr. on the border of California and Mexico with his twin brother Oscar.

== Plot ==
Many years ago, after Lucille (Jessica Walter) fled with the Queen Mary, George Sr. (Jeffrey Tambor) visits Stan Sitwell (Ed Begley, Jr.) to ask him to buy the rest of the Bluth Company stock. Sitwell declines, saying that he already has a construction agreement with the government. George Sr. sees Sitwell's plans and mistakenly believes he is going to build a George W. Bush monument, but Lucille later explains to him that the plans are actually to build a wall between the United States and Mexico, an idea she claims to have originally made. George Sr. then meets with Oscar (Tambor). They visit the border of California and Mexico, and George Sr. offers to buy the land after Oscar says they are going to be evicted. Lucille plots with George Sr. to steal Sitwell's deal and build the wall for the government.

Months later, George Sr. and Lucille pretend to be getting a divorce to ward off suspicion of their plans. The government puts their border plans on hold, so George Sr. decides to start up a spiritual "Sweat & Squeeze" business. They get money by having Oscar take the clients, wealthy businessmen, into a sweat lodge for an hour. George Sr. then switches places with Oscar so he can charge the businessmen upwards of $10,000 for a small cup of lemonade. Having passed out, George Sr. misses Lucille's trial. George Sr. and Lucille meet weekly to pretend to plan their divorce, while actually having sex. Oscar hallucinates seeing a Native American person telling them to stop stealing from nature.

A year later, George Sr. loses his control over the businessmen, and Barry Zuckerkorn (Henry Winkler) warns him that he needs to pay a balloon payment of $15 million. They plan to have George Sr. get a politician to endorse the border so that George Sr. can start building it. They decide to ask Herbert Love (Terry Crews), who is running for mayor against Lucille Austero (Liza Minnelli). Over the past year, Lucille and George Sr. start growing further apart. Oscar tells George Sr. that he needs a break from sitting in the heat for their scam, and George Sr. asks him to pretend to be him and visit Lucille. Barry accidentally tells Oscar about the border, thinking he is George Sr.

=== On the next Arrested Development... ===
While impersonating George Sr., Oscar confirms his suspicions of the border with Lucille, and they have sex.

== Production ==
"Borderline Personalities" was directed by series creator Mitchell Hurwitz and executive producer Troy Miller, and written by executive producer Jim Vallely and co-executive producer Richard Rosenstock. It was Hurwitz and Miller's second directing credits, Vallely's 16th writing credit and Rosenstock's eighth writing credit.

The season's format is different compared to previous seasons, as each of the 15 episodes focus on one individual character, with every episode happening at the same time within the show's universe, showing the character's activities since the conclusion of the third season. "Borderline Personalities" was the third episode of the season to be filmed, and the first of two focusing on George Sr.

== Reception ==
Eric Goldman of IGN gave the episode a 6.8 out of 10, calling it "notably weak for a show that has delivered in the way [Arrested Development] has." Goldman praised Rajskub's role as Fireheart, but called her "kind of wasted". The Guardian's Hadley Freeman commented on the episode, saying he is "Still not wholly loving the show, but it does include one of the best scenes ever made in Arrested [Development] in which Lucille smokes into Buster's mouth and he blows it out the window." Noel Murray of The A.V. Club gave the episode a "C+" grade, and commented that "there’s not much story within “Borderline Personalities.” It’s more a collection of character moments and set-up." In 2019, Brian Tallerico from Vulture ranked the episode 81st out of the whole series, calling it "one of the show’s biggest duds."
