= The B. Team =

- Arrested Development episode
- Episode no.: Season 4 Episode 4
- Directed by: Troy Miller; Mitchell Hurwitz
- Written by: Mitchell Hurwitz; Jim Vallely
- Cinematography by: Peter Lyons Collister; Chuck Ozeas
- Editing by: Kabir Akhtar; Ruthie Aslan
- Production code: 4AJD02
- Original air date: May 26, 2013
- Running time: 31 minutes

Guest appearances
- Henry Winkler as Barry Zuckerkorn; Ron Howard as himself; Scott Baio as Bob Loblaw; Judy Greer as Kitty Sanchez; Seth Rogen as Young George Bluth; Kristen Wiig as Young Lucille Bluth; Isla Fisher as Rebel Alley; Carl Weathers as himself; James Lipton as Warden Stefan Gentles; Dan Harmon as Yurt Clerk; Andy Richter as himself / Rocky Richter; Brian Grazer as himself; Conan O'Brien as himself; Maria Bamford as Debrie Bardeaux; Allan Wasserman as Herb Zuckerkorn; Liza Minnelli as Lucille Austero; John Krasinski as Jerry Bruckheimer's Assistant (uncredited)

Episode chronology
← Previous "Indian Takers"	Next → "A New Start"
- Arrested Development season 4

"The B. Team" is the fourth episode of the fourth season of the American television satirical sitcom Arrested Development. It is the 57th overall episode of the series, and was written by series creator Mitchell Hurwitz and executive producer Jim Vallely, and directed by executive producer Troy Miller and Hurwitz. It originally released on May 26, 2013 with the rest of the season, and was distributed by Netflix.

The series, narrated by Ron Howard, follows the Bluths, a formerly wealthy, dysfunctional family, who made their money from property development. The Bluth family consists of Michael, his adopted sister Lindsay, his older brother Gob, his younger brother Buster, their mother Lucille and father George Sr., as well as Michael's son George-Michael, and Lindsay and her husband Tobias' daughter Maeby. Each episode of the season follows a different character, with this episode focusing on Michael meeting with real life Ron Howard to discuss making a film about the Bluths.

== Plot ==
Michael (Jason Bateman) starts working at Google, where he receives a company car. He receives a call from Barry Zuckerkorn (Henry Winkler), who informs him that filmmaker Ron Howard (played by himself) is interested in making a film about the Bluth family. Michael drives to the building of Imagine Entertainment, where he runs into Kitty Sanchez (Judy Greer), who works there as Ron's assistant after being hired by Maeby (Alia Shawkat). Michael meets with Ron, who tells him that he saw the Altitude magazine that Michael was in. Ron tells Michael that he wants his daughter Rebel Alley (Isla Fisher), who Michael thinks is Ron's mistress, to play Michael's wife Tracey in the film. Ron tells Michael that he needs to get all of his family members to sign a release so they can be portrayed in the film, that he wants to focus on the father-son dynamic in the film, and gives him a business card which states him as a co-associate producer of the film.

Michael calls Barry, who informs him that it will be difficult to get George Sr.'s (Seth Rogen) signature, because in 1982, he told him to not have a signature to avoid having to sign any legal documents. Michael then walks into Rebel, who he does not recognize, causing them both to drop their papers. As they pick up their papers, Rebel tells Michael that she is looking for a movie producer, which he informs her that he is. Rebel invites Michael to watch her perform in a Scottish band, and as they part ways, Michael realizes that he never got her name. Michael finds George Sr. (Jeffrey Tambor) having an affair with Lucille Austero (Liza Minnelli) and asks him to sign the release form, which George Sr. declines. (Note: It is later revealed in the episode "Double Crossers" that this was Oscar impersonating George Sr.) Kitty takes Michael to his office at Imagine Entertainment, where he asks Carl Weathers (played by himself) if he has the rights to the Bluth family's story. Carl tells Michael he never had the rights to begin with, instead advising Michael to falsify the events of the film.

Michael then asks Warden Stefan Gentles to help with the screenplay, who suggests getting a Philip Seymour Hoffman-type actor to play George Sr., which leads Michael to Andy Richter (played by himself). After being belittled by Conan O'Brien (played by himself), Andy agrees to the film. Michael brings Carl, Stefan, and Conan to Ron, who is unimpressed. At the Orange County office of Imagine Entertainment, George Sr. visits Michael. After George Sr. finds out that Michael wants to impress Rebel, George Sr. agrees to sign the release form. Michael tells Ron that he has gotten George Sr.'s signature, but Ron clarifies that he wants to focus on Michael's relationship with George Michael (Michael Cera). Michael then runs into Rebel and tells her over drinks that she could play his wife in the film, and they bond over them both having sons. Michael and Rebel then make out in a photo booth, where he learns from a tattoo on her back that her name is Rebel.

=== On the next Arrested Development... ===
Michael helps a customer with a hernia who went to the Orange County office of Imagine Entertainment, thinking it was an imaging centre. Conan O’Brien gets Andy Richter’s identical brother, Rocky, to replace him on The Tonight Show with Conan O'Brien.

== Production ==
"The B. Team" was directed by series creator Mitchell Hurwitz and executive producer Troy Miller, and written by Hurwitz and executive producer Jim Vallely. It was Hurwitz's fourth directing credit and 20th writing credit, Miller's fourth directing credit, and Vallely's 17th writing credit.

The season's format is different compared to previous seasons, as each of the 15 episodes focus on one individual character, with every episode happening at the same time within the show's universe, showing the character's activities since the conclusion of the third season. "The B. Team" was the second episode of the season to be filmed, and the second of two focusing on Michael.

== Reception ==
Eric Goldman of IGN gave the episode a 7.5 out of 10, saying:

"Episode 4 of the new season of Arrested Development is the last of the early episodes I felt were notably struggling to recapture that old magic. It’s certainly an improvement over the George Sr. and Lindsay episodes, but still doesn’t completely take off – but it does have some more inspiration behind it and more memorable moments."

Goldman cited the "influx of old recurring characters" as the reason for the episode feeling "the most like an older [Arrested Development] of the Season 4 installments up to this point." He also commented on Ron Howard's appearance in the episode, calling it "a bit too self-aware, even for this show." The Guardian's Hadley Freeman called the episode the "most jampacked and in-jokey episode yet." Freeman criticized the lack of "interaction between the family", as well as Michael "becoming less and less likable ... not really in a fun way." Noel Murray and Erik Adams of The A.V. Club gave the episode a "C" grade. Adams commented on how "The sensation that [he] got from “Indian Takers” and “The B. Team” is one of emptiness". Murray called the episodes "a little exhausting". In 2019, Brian Tallerico from Vulture ranked the episode 54th out of the whole series, and praised Isla Fisher's guest appearance."
