= Colony Collapse (disambiguation) =

Colony Collapse may refer to:

- Colony collapse disorder
- "Colony Collapse" (Arrested Development), an episode of Arrested Development
- "Colony Collapse" (Cloak & Dagger), an episode of Cloak & Dagger
- "Colony Collapse" (song), a song by Architects
