= Dean Lorey =

American writer (born 1967)

- Born: November 17, 1967 (age 58); Conyers, Georgia, U.S.
- Education: New York University
- Occupations: Writer, author
- Spouse: Elizabeth Lorey
- Children: 2

Dean Lorey (born November 17, 1967) is an American writer and producer whose projects include films such as Major Payne and Animal Crackers, and television series which include Harley Quinn, My Wife and Kids, Arrested Development, The Crazy Ones, Those Who Can't, Powerless and iZombie. He is the author of the children's book series Nightmare Academy.

== Biography ==
Lorey grew up in Conyers, Georgia before attending New York University's film school, where he wrote book cover copy for Simon & Schuster and Bantam as well as writing commercials for MTV and Nickelodeon. In 1990. He moved to California and wrote a script for the movie that would become My Boyfriend's Back, collaborating with Adam Marcus and Sean S. Cunningham. Afterward, Sean asked him to finish the screenplay for Jason Goes to Hell: The Final Friday, in which he also had a cameo appearance. From there, he continued to write screenplays for movies as well as working on writing, directing, and producing for television.

== Works ==
=== Film ===
Year	Film	Credit	Notes
1993	My Boyfriend's Back	Screenplay by	
1993	Jason Goes to Hell: The Final Friday	Screenplay by	Co-wrote screenplay with Jay Huguely, based on a story by Jay Huguely and Adam Marcus
1995	Major Payne	Screenplay by	Co-wrote screenplay with Damon Wayans and Gary Rosen, based on a story by Joe Connelly & Bob Mosher
2001	Jason X	Special thanks	
2011	Drive Angry	The director and writer wish to thank	
2012	Bronx Warrants	Written by, executive producer	TV movie
2016	Shady Neighbors	Written by, executive producer	TV movie
2017	Animal Crackers	Written by	Co-wrote with Scott Christian Sava

=== Television ===
- 1997–1998 413 Hope St.
- 2001–2005 My Wife and Kids
- 2006, 2013 Arrested Development
- 2013–2014 The Crazy Ones
- 2016 Those Who Can't
- 2017 Powerless
- 2018 iZombie
- 2019–present Harley Quinn
- 2021–2022 Big Shot
- 2024 Kite Man: Hell Yeah!
- 2024–2025 Poppa's House
- 2024–present Creature Commandos

=== Book ===
- 2007 Nightmare Academy: Monster Hunters
- 2008 Nightmare Academy: Charlie's Monsters (The UK edition of Monster Hunters)
- 2008 Nightmare Academy: Monster Madness
- 2009 Nightmare Academy: Monster Revenge also known as Nightmare Academy: Monster War

== Personal life ==
Dean Lorey currently lives in Calabasas, California, with his wife, Elizabeth, and their sons, Chris and Alex. His first book came out on August 21, 2007. Universal has purchased the film rights to the book and the producers will be Stephen Sommers and Bob Ducsay, who worked on movies such as The Mummy.
