= Jim Vallely =

American screenwriter

- Born: James Vallely; August 30, 1954 (age 70); East Brunswick, New Jersey, United States
- Occupation(s): Television producer and writer
- Years active: 1980–present
- Spouse: Myra Turley
- Children: Tannis Vallely

James Vallely (born August 30, 1954) is an American television producer and screenwriter. He has written and produced for The Golden Girls, Two and a Half Men, My Wife and Kids, The John Larroquette Show, and Ladies Man, as well as Arrested Development, a multiple Emmy Award-winning television show on the Fox network. Valley was an executive producer and co-creator of Running Wilde, also on Fox, along with Mitchell Hurwitz and Will Arnett.

His work on Arrested Development won him a Primetime Emmy Award and a Writers Guild Of America Award.

Vallely grew up in East Brunswick Township, New Jersey, graduating from East Brunswick High School in 1972. He attended both Middlesex County College and New York University, and later moved to California in 1982. He wrote for a number of TV series, including ten episodes of The Golden Girls, which was his first paid work as a writer. His daughter is former child actor Tannis Vallely.
