= John Beard (news anchor) =

American news anchor and actor

- Born: 1948 (age 77–78); St. Pauls, North Carolina, U.S.
- Education: East Carolina University (BA)
- Occupation: News anchor

John Beard (born 1948) is an American retired television news anchor and actor. He is best known for his work as a news anchor in major media markets, including Los Angeles and Buffalo, with tenures at KNBC and KTTV. Over the course of his career, Beard became recognized for his journalistic integrity and resistance to sensationalism in local news. In addition to his broadcasting career, he has made recurring appearances as a fictionalized version of himself in several television series, including Arrested Development.

== Early life and career ==
Beard was born in St. Pauls, North Carolina. He served as a Navy corpsman with the United States Marine Corps and graduated from East Carolina University. After college, he worked for television stations WITN-TV in Washington, North Carolina (1972–1976), WXII-TV in Winston-Salem (1976–1977), and WIVB-TV in Buffalo, New York (1977–1981).

== KNBC-TV (1981–1993) ==
From 1981 to 1993, Beard was a news anchor at KNBC in Los Angeles. His co-anchors included Tritia Toyota, Kristie Wilde, Kelly Lange, and Linda Alvarez. He also anchored NBC News Digest segments broadcast during primetime in the Pacific Time Zone.

Beard left KNBC in November 1993, citing concerns over editorial direction, including an emphasis on celebrity news and what he described as misleading teases, particularly regarding pop singer Michael Jackson. He was replaced on the 4 p.m. Channel 4 News broadcast by former KABC-TV anchor Chuck Henry.

Beard was on set during a widely reported incident on August 19, 1987, when a man entered the KNBC studio with a toy gun and demanded that a manifesto be read on air.

== KTTV (1993–2007) ==
In December 1993, Beard joined KTTV in Los Angeles as co-anchor of the 10 p.m. newscast alongside Christine Devine. At the time, KNBC allowed him to leave his contract to join KTTV, which did not have a competing 11 p.m. newscast, but denied his release to rival stations KCBS-TV or KABC-TV.

Beard left KTTV in December 2007. He later stated that his departure was related to concerns over the station's increasing focus on celebrity news over substantive reporting. He was succeeded by former KTLA Morning News anchor Carlos Amezcua.

== WGRZ (2009–2018) ==
In 2009, Beard returned to Buffalo to anchor the morning and midday newscasts on WGRZ, an NBC affiliate owned by Tegna Inc. Under his tenure, the Daybreak morning show rose to the top of the local ratings.

On November 1, 2016, WGRZ announced that Beard would retire at the end of the year. He ultimately remained at the station until January 18, 2018, when he delivered his final broadcast.

== Acting work ==
Beard has portrayed fictionalized versions of himself as a news anchor in various television series. His roles include appearances in the 1994 animated series Spider-Man, the drama series 24, and the sitcom Arrested Development.
