= Hadley Freeman =

American-British journalist (born 1978)

- Born: Hadley Clare Freeman; May 15, 1978 (age 48); New York City, New York, U.S.
- Education: St Anne's College, Oxford (BA)
- Children: 3
- Relatives: Catie Lazarus (cousin)
- Awards: The Press Awards Broadsheet Columnist of the Year (2024)

Hadley Clare Freeman (born 15 May 1978) is an American British journalist. She writes for The Sunday Times, having previously written for The Guardian.

In 2024, she won Broadsheet Columnist of the Year from The Press Awards.

== Early life ==
Freeman moved to London from New York City in her youth. She has dual British and American citizenship.

Freeman suffered from anorexia and was treated in a psychiatric unit during six different periods between ages 13 and 17. After taking her A-level examinations while boarding at the Cambridge Centre for Sixth-form Studies, she read English literature at St Anne's College, Oxford, and edited the student newspaper Cherwell.

== Career ==
After a year in Paris, Freeman worked on the fashion desk of The Guardian for eight years. She joined The Guardian in 2000 and has worked for the newspaper as a staff writer and columnist and contributes to the UK version of Vogue. Following an article for The Guardian in July 2013 criticising misogynistic behaviour, Freeman received a bomb threat on Twitter.

Freeman's books include The Meaning of Sunglasses: A Guide to (Almost) All Things Fashionable, in 2009 and Be Awesome: Modern Life for Modern Ladies in 2013, which was described by Jennifer Lipman in The Jewish Chronicle as "a detailed attack on how women are both portrayed and conditioned to act in public life". Life Moves Pretty Fast appeared in 2015.

In March 2020, House of Glass: The Story and Secrets of a Twentieth-Century Jewish Family, was published. It is an account of the lives of her grandmother Sala Glass and her three brothers Alex, Jacques, and Henri in Poland, France, and the United States during the course of the twentieth century. Karen Heller wrote in The Washington Post of Freeman being "an exacting historian" who "tackles anti-Semitism, Jewish guilt and success".

Freeman ended her Weekend Guardian column in September 2021 to concentrate on interviews for the newspaper. In November 2022, Freeman announced that she would be leaving The Guardian and would write for The Sunday Times.

Her memoir Good Girls: A Story and Study of Anorexia, recounting her teenage experience of anorexia, was published by Fourth Estate in April 2023.

In September 2024, Freeman, Jonathan Freedland and David Aaronovitch resigned from The Jewish Chronicle.

== Views ==
In June 2018, Freeman denounced the treatment of undocumented child immigrants arriving in America, drawing parallels with her grandmother's experience of escaping from the Holocaust. Freeman described it as deliberate cruelty by the Trump administration, and a reflection of latent racism amongst its supporters.

In November 2018, U.S. journalists from The Guardian published an opinion piece criticising a Guardian editorial about the Gender Recognition Act, arguing it was transphobic. In tweets, Freeman defended the editorial. She has since been cited as expressing views that US media outlets have considered transphobic, particularly in regard to trans people seeking healthcare and trans people struggling with suicidal ideation. In June 2021, Freeman used her regular opinion column in The Guardian to describe that she had "lost at least a dozen friends over this ... friends who have told me my beliefs are transphobic". In December 2022, after 22 years of working for The Guardian Freeman left the newspaper after she said she was denied her request to follow up on The Daily Telegraph's investigation into the charity Mermaids, which supports transgender youth in the UK. She said there was an "atmosphere of real fear" at The Guardian over its coverage of trans issues, saying that the paper was not allowing her and others to write on gender issues and barring her from interviewing J. K. Rowling and Martina Navratilova who have gender-critical views.

In an essay in the Jewish Quarterly from May 2024, she argues that the progressive Left had "hijacked" the 2023 Hamas-led attack on Israel and had been misrepresenting those atrocities.

== Personal life ==
Freeman often discusses cinema, particularly from the 1980s, in her articles and occasionally in broadcasts. She has said that her favourite film is Ghostbusters and that she has a collection of related books and articles.

She has twin sons and a daughter.
