= Development Arrested =

- Arrested Development episode
- Michael and George Michael motor off into the sunset on Gob's yacht (middle).
- Episode no.: Season 3 Episode 13
- Directed by: John Fortenberry
- Story by: Richard Day; Mitchell Hurwitz
- Teleplay by: Chuck Tatham; Jim Vallely
- Cinematography by: Greg Harrington
- Editing by: Stuart Bass; Richard Candib
- Production code: 3AJD13
- Original air date: February 10, 2006
- Running time: 22 minutes

Guest appearances
- Ed Begley Jr. as Stan Sitwell; Mae Whitman as Ann Veal; Justin Lee as Annyong Bluth; Jeff Garlin as Mort Meyers

Episode chronology
← Previous "Exit Strategy"	Next → "Flight of the Phoenix"
- Arrested Development season 3

"Development Arrested", originally titled "Harboring Resentment", is the thirteenth and final episode of the third season of the American television satirical sitcom Arrested Development. It was written by co-executive producers Chuck Tatham and Jim Vallely from a story by co-executive producer Richard Day and series creator Mitchell Hurwitz, and was directed by John Fortenberry. It was the final episode to air on the Fox Network before the series was cancelled, but the series was revived by Netflix years later for two more seasons. It originally aired in the United States on February 10, 2006, along with the three previous episodes in a two-hour block competing against the 2006 Winter Olympics opening ceremony.

The series, narrated by Ron Howard, follows the Bluths, a formerly wealthy, dysfunctional family, who made their money from property development. In the episode, Michael (Jason Bateman) is relieved to have all the charges against his father George Sr. (Jeffrey Tambor) dropped, but shocked to learn Lucille (Jessica Walter) holds the real power in his family. Meanwhile, George Michael (Michael Cera) comes to term with his crush on his cousin Maeby (Alia Shawkat), while, concurrently, Lindsay (Portia de Rossi) finds out she isn't really a Bluth, and was, in fact, adopted.

Written as the series finale, the episode makes a hint towards a potential movie based on the series, which Hurwitz found to be "sneaky". Justin Lee recalled that the final day of filming was "bittersweet". Upon airing, "Development Arrested" received mostly positive reviews from critics, and is considered one of the greatest episodes of Arrested Development. It received particular praise for wrapping up the series in a satisfying way. It earned the series a nomination for Outstanding Writing for a Comedy Series at the 58th Primetime Emmy Awards, and has received analysis from both critics and scholars since release.

== Plot ==
After kissing his cousin Maeby, an ashamed George Michael Bluth sleeps in the bed of his father Michael, who is excited that the Bluth Company is free of its criminal charges. At a celebratory party, Michael asks his family not to sell their company shares, as they are holding a shareholders meeting later that day. Michael speaks with his father George Sr., who reveals to him that their fortune came from stealing a business idea from a Korean immigrant. Michael is more shocked to learn this was his mother Lucille's doing.

Michael finds his brother Gob (Will Arnett) at the docks, who reveals he plans on selling his stock and working for the Bluth Company's competitor, Stan Sitwell (Ed Begley Jr.), but Michael advises him against this. Later, George Michael tells Michael about Maeby; Michael suggests that George Michael should go back to his ex-girlfriend, Ann (Mae Whitman). Michael's sister Lindsay meets with Stan to tell him that she won't sell, and Stan accidentally reveals that Lindsay was adopted from the Bluths as an attempt to one-up the Sitwells, who also wished to adopt. Lindsay comes on to Michael, since they aren't related, but he turns her down. Lindsay's husband Tobias (David Cross) tells Michael he plans to sell, so Michael makes him an offer not to on the basis of Tobias getting a salary.

After Lucille tries to get him to bribe the family into not selling, Michael is informed that the meeting will now be hosted on the Queen Mary. George Michael goes to Gob's yacht, where he finds out that Ann has been dating Gob, and he punches Gob in the face. At the meeting, Lucille's adopted son Annyong (Justin Lee) shows up, revealing he was secretly a spy trying to avenge his grandfather—the immigrant that the Bluths had stolen from—and he has alerted the authorities. Michael tries to find George Michael, but Lucille attempts to stop him from going, asserting that the company is more important than family. Michael runs off, and Lucille sells part of the company to Stan just as the SEC arrives; Lucille leaves with the Queen Mary. Michael tells George Michael that he can't act on his feelings for Maeby, even if she is not a blood-relative, (Note: Maeby is the daughter of Lindsay, who is not a Bluth by blood, making Maeby unrelated to George Michael.) and the two off into the sunset, finally leaving the family on their own.

In the epilogue, Maeby—having regained her job as a film producer—pitches the series to Ron Howard. Howard dismisses the concept as TV show, suggesting a movie instead.

== Production ==
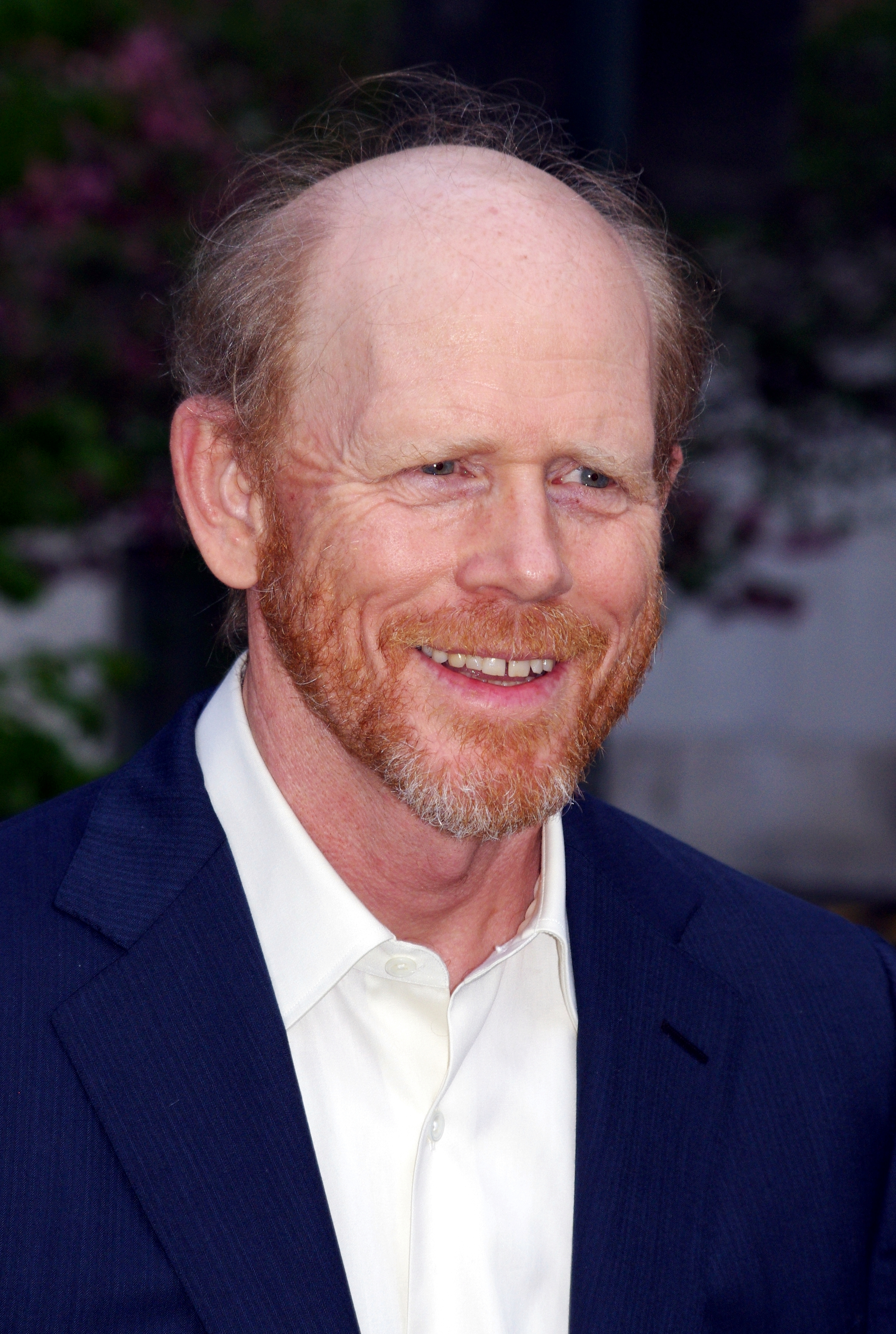
Series narrator Ron Howard makes an appearance in the episode.

"Development Arrested" was directed by John Fortenberry, and written by co-executive producers Chuck Tatham and Jim Vallely, adapted from a story by co-executive producer Richard Day and series creator Mitchell Hurwitz. It was Tatham's third and final writing credit for the series, and Vallely's 15th writing credit. The episode was the 13th and final episode of the season to be filmed. After Arrested Development was cancelled by Fox for low ratings, the episode was written as a potential series finale.

During production, it was originally intended to be titled "Harboring Resentment". Jeff Garlin and Mae Whitman make cameo appearances as Mort and Ann, respectively. The episode contains a subtle hint towards a potential Arrested Development movie; in the post-credits scene, Maeby pitches a television series to Ron Howard based on the events of Arrested Development, but he instead suggests they make a movie out of the concept. Howard was both an executive producer on the series, and its narrator. Hurwitz later reminisced about how "sneaky" this line was, asserting that he was already considering doing a movie follow-up at the time. However, no movie would be made. The episode makes references to Skating with Celebrities, a show that took over the series' time slot on Fox after it concluded.

Justin Lee reprised his role as Annyong, recalling that the final day of filming was "bittersweet". He brought his grandfather on set with him, which he later joked helped him method-act his narrative in the episode about Annyong's grandfather. Lee recalled that Howard and Hurwitz did not look stressed about the series concluding so early, suggesting that they already had plans for a revival to the series sometime in the future. Jessica Walter had personally asked the series' producers to bring Lee back for the finale, and, for doing this, she received a hug from Lee at the wrap party.

== Themes and analysis ==
The episode uses a common theme of narrative structure to offer a sense of finality and coherence, distinguishing real life from television shows like Arrested Development. Where real life often leaves parts of our lives with loose ends and unresolved conflicts, "Development Arrested" goes as far as to tie together multiple different aspects of the show, making the complex experiences seen throughout the previous three seasons much more streamlined. A common theme of the episode is the idea that the Bluth family is naturally incestuous within the relationships its members choose to pursue, even if the relationships are not between blood-relatives; such as when Gob is revealed to have begun dating Ann, his nephew's ex-girlfriend. The episode uses plots like this to reiterate Sigmund Freud's point that the taboo aspects of incest are often more cultural than biological, as, even if Maeby and George Michael are not blood-relatives, they are still each other's family, and having a relationship would be wrong, as said by Michael. It subverts traditional sitcom expectations through its humor, according to authors Gry C. Rustad and Timotheus Vermeulen, since, instead of following a predictable plot approach, it creates joke out of moments unrelated to the narrative, garnering an unexpected reaction out of the viewer. They particularly discuss this in the scene where, after George Michael goes to Ann's house to find her, a boy never before seen in the series runs out of the house in an unexplained manner; this stops the narrative for a gag, but the effective "world" of the series keeps on going, and we, as the viewer, are not given any more context towards the scene, similar to the humor style of Monty Python, a British comedy troupe.

Author Navid Sabet notes that the episode wraps up the central theme of season three revolving around inter-cousin marriage and relationships. By having George Michael and Maeby kiss—and subsequently be told that they are apparently related—the series neither normalizes or disregards their attraction to each other, instead using it to create a lesson of how family is still family, whether there is a blood-relation or not. Sabet uses the concluding scene of Michael telling this to George Michael as a way to tie the series back to the teachings of French historian Michel Foucault, particularly his assertion that the prohibiting of incest can resist the breakdown of family alliances. "Development Arrested" highlights how Lucille is the mastermind behind every morally corrupt decision the Bluth Company makes throughout Arrested Development; even if the company is free of its SEC violations, Lucille continues pestering George Sr. into making decisions that benefit only herself. It ironically showcases how the family's "Family first" motto—said multiple times in the past three seasons—leads to moral stagnation, concluding the series on the ultimate lesson that the Bluths are not aspirational figures, and should be used as an example of how not to run a company.

== Release ==
"Development Arrested" was first broadcast on February 10, 2006, on the Fox Network at 10:00 p.m. Eastern Standard Time in the United States; it aired as the conclusion to a four-episode back-to-back marathon that day. It aired directly against NBC's coverage of the 2006 Winter Olympics opening ceremony. In the United States, the episode was watched by 3.43 million viewers on its original broadcast, making it the second most watched episode of the marathon, behind the previous by 40 thousand. That night's opening ceremony would ultimately receive 23.24 million viewers, almost 20 million more than "Development Arrested".

The episode was first released on home video in the United States on August 29, 2006, in the Complete Third Season DVD box set. The set includes audio commentary for the episode from Hurwitz, Will Arnett, Jason Bateman, Michael Cera, David Cross, Tony Hale, Portia de Rossi, Alia Shawkat and Jessica Walter; along with a behind-the-scenes segment detailing the final day of filming.

=== Revival ===
Although the episode was written as the series' finale, Arrested Development was later revived by the American streaming service Netflix for a fourth season in 2013, which took place following the events of "Development Arrested", explaining what happened to each member of the Bluth family since. Netflix would then bring it back again for a fifth and final season, released in two parts from 2018 to 2019.

== Reception ==
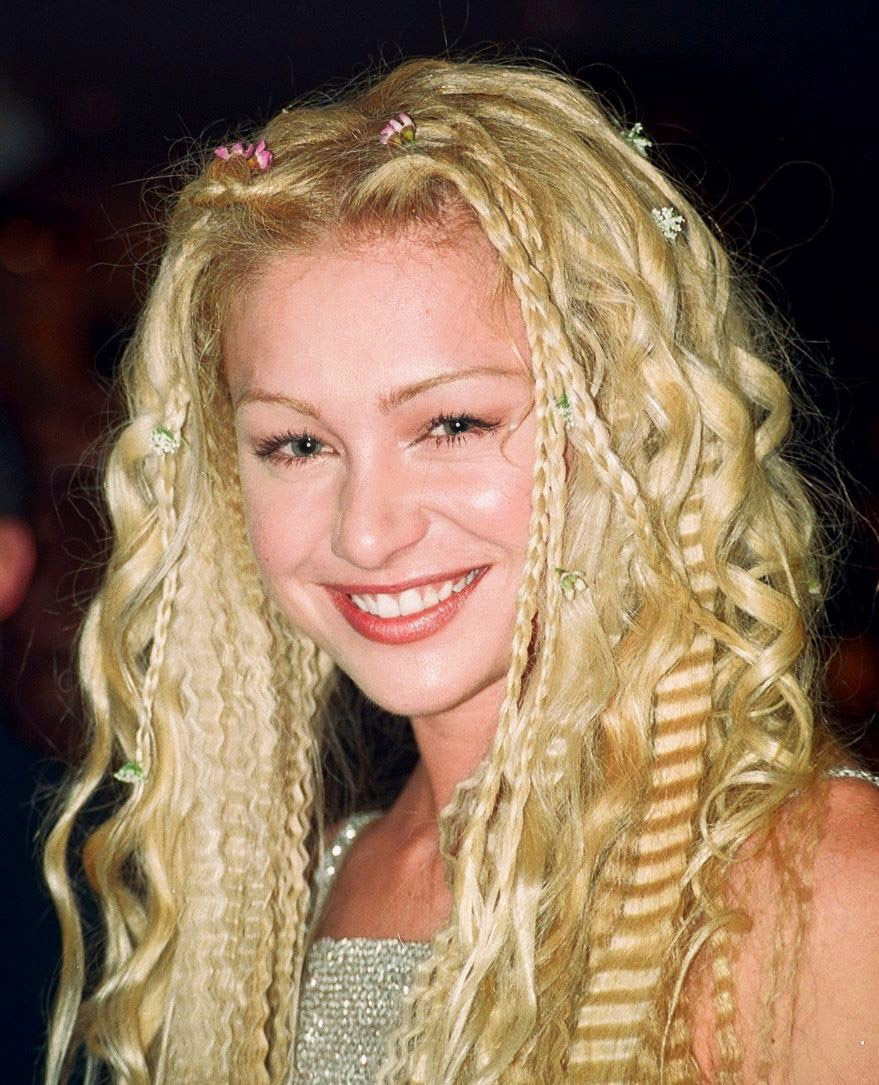
Critical reception to Lindsay's (Portia de Rossi pictured) plot was mixed, with some considering it to be a highlight, while others described the scenes of her coming on to Michael as "creepy".

The A.V. Club writer Noel Murray felt the episode delivered many great gags, and asserted that it ended the series on a thematically high note for capturing the essence of what made it critically acclaimed in the first place. However, Murray felt the episode was not surprising enough, and spent enough time trying to retcon plot lines that it became too "self-[referential]", as well as introducing the love plot between Michael and Lindsay, which he thought was more "creepy" than humorous. He ended his review that noting that most of his criticisms were nitpicks, as a result of the episode falling short to the rest of the season, but felt it created an intriguing ending that left room for a continuation. Jennifer Lee-Maxwell of Collider found the episode to perfectly align with "Pilot", praising it for wrapping up the series in a satisfying manner. Brian Tallerico from Vulture ranked the episode as the tenth best of the whole series, asserting that it worked well as a series finale, particularly for bringing the series back to the events of "Pilot", and for making the promise of a potential movie.

Series creator Mitchell Hurwitz ranked "Development Arrested" as his joint-favorite episode of the show with "Exit Strategy" in 2006, particularly for giving many "revelations" to the narrative, and for containing notable guest stars. Jon Weisman of Variety, also in 2006, hailed the episode as worthy of an Emmy, for which it was already nominated, finding the scene of Lindsay coming on to Michael to be its finest moment. Weisman asserted that he felt the series remained clever even in its final moments, but felt it did not go down as a "classic" finale.

”Development Arrested" was listed as the best Arrested Development episode by Chad Collins of /Film, who wrote that it worked as a "perfect sendoff" to the series. He highlights the twist that Lindsay is not a Bluth and the conclusion on the Queen Mary as substantial reasons for its success. The A.V. Club's Saloni Gajjar noted that the episode has to deal with the task of culminating three whole seasons of television since the third season's episode order was cut down by so much; and yet, he felt it helped cement season three as a high quality piece of television, despite its rocky start.

For their work on the episode, Richard Day, Mitchell Hurwitz, Chuck Tatham and Jim Vallely received a nomination for Outstanding Writing for a Comedy Series at the 58th Primetime Emmy Awards. It ultimately lost to the My Name Is Earl episode "Pilot".
