= S.O.B.s =

- Arrested Development episode
- Episode no.: Season 3 Episode 9
- Directed by: Robert Berlinger
- Written by: Richard Day; Jim Vallely
- Cinematography by: Greg Harrington
- Editing by: Stuart Bass
- Production code: 3AJD09
- Original air date: January 2, 2006
- Running time: 22 minutes

Guest appearances
- Andy Richter as Andy, Donnie, Emmett and Rocky Richter; Bob Einstein as Larry; Jack McBrayer as Country Club Waiter; John Beard as himself; Zach Braff as Phillip Litt (uncredited); Ben Stiller as Tony Wonder (uncredited)

Episode chronology
← Previous "Making a Stand"	Next → "Fakin' It"
- Arrested Development season 3

"S.O.B.s" is the ninth episode of the third season of the American television satirical sitcom Arrested Development. It is the 49th overall episode of the series, and was written by co-executive producers Richard Day and Jim Vallely, and directed by Robert Berlinger. It originally aired on Fox on January 2, 2006, less than a month after Variety announced that the episode order for the season had been cut from 22 to 13.

The series, narrated by Ron Howard, follows the Bluths, a formerly wealthy, dysfunctional family, who made their money from property development. The Bluth family consists of Michael, his twin sister Lindsay, his older brother Gob, his younger brother Buster, their mother Lucille and father George Sr., as well as Michael's son George Michael, and Lindsay and her husband Tobias' daughter Maeby. In the episode, to get enough money to hire a new family lawyer, everyone has to pitch in to prepare for the upcoming company fundraiser, aptly named "Save Our Bluths".

== Plot ==
Michael (Jason Bateman) tells the family that they need to raise $100,000 as a retainer for a new lawyer and suggests that everyone get a job, but George Sr. (Jeffrey Tambor) suggests that they hold a fundraiser dinner called "Save Our Bluths". Lindsay (Portia de Rossi) and Tobias (David Cross) find out that Maeby (Alia Shawkat) has not been attending classes at her new-age school and will be expelled. While at a restaurant, Gob (Will Arnett) decides to play a trick on Lucille (Jessica Walter) by pretending to be a waiter, but she never looks at him and does not know that Gob is playing a trick. Gob continues as a waiter in the hopes that Lucille will notice and is handed the tips he earned during his accidental shift.

George Michael (Michael Cera) is asked to express himself in an essay for an assignment by his teacher, Donnie Richter (Andy Richter), at his new school. Tobias tells Maeby she has to help him make some gift bags to send to casting directors if she does not want to go to school. George Michael is struggles to write an essay criticizing his father, so he asks Maeby for help, tricking her into writing his essay for him. The next day, Michael goes to see how George Michael is doing at his new school and finds him reading an essay in which Maeby criticized Tobias, thinking the criticism is directed at him. Gob continues to work at the restaurant and begins flirting with the women to garner better tips but unknowingly begins flirting with Lucille, and they both are disgusted when they realize what has just happened.

Lucille, mad that Gob is a waiter and Lindsey is a "housewife", says she does not want them to come to the dinner. Maeby, tired of spending time with Tobias, arranges for him to get a bit part in a movie. George Michael tells Michael that Maeby had written the essay, not him. Rocky, Donnie's identical brother, confronts Michael about Donnie being poisoned. Lucille panics about the caterers refusing to come because she had run up a high balance at the clubhouse, but the party begins with several celebrities in attendance and Lindsay doing the cooking. George Sr. accidentally reveals to Michael that he was the "muffin man" and that he poisoned Donnie, and George Michael then apologizes for criticizing his father. Michael then gives a speech in which he says that "maybe the Bluths are not worth saving" and tells everyone that he threatens people and that George Sr. poisons them, making all of the guests rush out in a panic. Michael then pledges to always listen to George Michael in the future, and George Michael tells him that he is in love with Maeby, but his father ignores him and simply says "I love you too."

=== On the next Arrested Development... ===
The Bluths receive donations due to Michael's speech not sounding desperate.

== Production ==
"S.O.B.s" was directed by Robert Berlinger, and written by co-executive producers Richard Day and Jim Vallely. It was Berlinger's second directing credit, Day's third writing credit and Vallely's 13th writing credit. It was the ninth episode of the season to be filmed. The episode parodies Arrested Development's cancellation, with a reference to the show's rumored move to cable television as Michael and George Sr. refer to the Home Builders Organization—parodying HBO—and Michael's use of the word "showtime"—referring to Showtime.

== Analysis ==
Since its airing, "S.O.B.s" has been labeled as a commentary on Arrested Development's cancellation and as a "plea for viewers" to watch the series. The episode's use of common rating-trap tactics and gimmicks, such as its guest star appearance from Andy Richter and use of 3-D graphics, has been labeled as an example of such pleading by author Saul Austerlitz.

== Reception ==
=== Viewers ===
In the United States, the episode was watched by 4.16 million viewers on its original broadcast.

=== Critical reception ===
The A.V. Club writer Noel Murray praised the episode, saying he "thought it was hilarious the first time [he] saw it back in 2006, and [he] laughed just about as much watching it for a second time". Brian Tallerico from Vulture ranked the episode as the thirteenth best of the whole series, calling it "One of the most meta episodes in TV history".
