= Arrested Development season 3 =

Season of television series

Arrested Development
- Season 3
- DVD cover
- Starring: Jason Bateman; Portia de Rossi; Will Arnett; Michael Cera; Alia Shawkat; Tony Hale; David Cross; Jeffrey Tambor; Jessica Walter
- No. of episodes: 13

Release
- Original network: Fox
- Original release: September 19, 2005 – February 10, 2006

Season chronology
- ← Previous; Season 2 Next → Season 4

The third season of the American television satirical sitcom series Arrested Development aired between September 19, 2005, and February 10, 2006, on Fox in the United States. It consists of 13 episodes, each running approximately 22 minutes in length. The third season was released on DVD in region 1 on August 29, 2006, in region 2 on April 23, 2007, and in region 4 on December 6, 2006. This was the final season of Arrested Development to be aired on Fox, as they had decided to cancel the series. However, Netflix revived the show in 2013 for a fourth season.

The show's storyline centers on the Bluth family, a formerly wealthy, habitually dysfunctional family and is presented in a continuous format, incorporating hand-held camera work, narration, archival photos and historical footage.

== Production ==
After the second season's airing, Fox renewed the series for a third season, which was originally slated for 22 episodes, but the production order was later cut down to 13.

== Cast ==
- Jason Bateman as Michael Bluth
- Portia de Rossi as Lindsay Bluth Fünke
- Will Arnett as Gob Bluth
- Michael Cera as George Michael Bluth
- Alia Shawkat as Maeby Fünke
- Tony Hale as Buster Bluth
- David Cross as Tobias Fünke
- Jeffrey Tambor as George Bluth, Sr. / Oscar Bluth
- Jessica Walter as Lucille Bluth
- Ron Howard as Narrator (uncredited)

== Episodes ==
The third season of Arrested Development consists of 13 episodes, which are listed below as ordered on the DVD collection and not in their original production order.

No. overall	No. in season	Title	Directed by	Written by	Original release date	Prod. code	US viewers (millions)
41	1	"The Cabin Show"	Paul Feig	Mitchell Hurwitz & Jim Vallely	September 19, 2005	3AJD01	4.62
When Michael realizes that Oscar, not George Sr., is serving time in prison, he sets off to find his father while trying to find time to reconnect with his son at the family's cabin. Gob learns he has a son.
42	2	"For British Eyes Only"	John Fortenberry	Mitchell Hurwitz & Richard Day	September 26, 2005	3AJD02	4.02
Michael falls for a British woman named Rita while investigating a claim by George Sr. that a British construction firm tricked him into doing business with the Iraqis.
43	3	"Forget-Me-Now"	John Amodeo	Tom Saunders	October 3, 2005	3AJD03	4.47
The family's new attorney works on George Sr.'s defense as he plans his escape. Michael tries to avoid having to introduce his family to Rita. Gob demonstrates his "Forget-me-now" pills.
44	4	"Notapusy"	Lev L. Spiro	Ron Weiner	November 7, 2005	3AJD04	4.19
Michael volunteers to participate in the father-son triathlon with Gob's son to prove his masculinity to Rita. Maeby attempts to expose the hypocrisy of an "Inner Beauty Contest" by appearing as her disabled alter-ego, Surely. George Sr. mistakenly delivers a "Startled Straight" lecture to a gathering of gay men.
45	5	"Mr. F"	Arlene Sanford	Richard Day & Jim Vallely	November 7, 2005	3AJD05	3.94
Gob tries to trick the company's Japanese investors by building a "Tiny Town", but Tobias ruins everything after he mistakes a CIA agent for a talent agent from CAA.
46	6	"The Ocean Walker"	Paul Feig	Jake Farrow & Sam Laybourne	December 5, 2005	3AJD06	4.09
When Michael decides to marry Rita, his parents oppose the idea–until they learn she is worth millions of dollars. His second thoughts come when he discovers that she is mentally disabled.
47	7	"Prison Break-In"	Robert Berlinger	Karey Dornetto	December 12, 2005	3AJD08	3.91
Michael is worried when he finds out that the prison warden is dating his mother and that the Bluth Foundation dinner is being held in the prison's new wing.
48	8	"Making a Stand"	Peter Lauer	Mitchell Hurwitz & Chuck Tatham	December 19, 2005	3AJD07	4.14
After yet another instance of George Sr. pitting Michael and Gob against each other, Michael decides to teach his father a lesson.
49	9	"S.O.B.s"	Robert Berlinger	Richard Day & Jim Vallely	January 2, 2006	3AJD09	4.16
To get enough money to hire a new family lawyer, everyone has to pitch in to prepare for the upcoming company fundraiser, "Save Our Bluths".
50	10	"Fakin' It"	Lev L. Spiro	Dean Lorey and Chuck Tatham	February 10, 2006	3AJD10	3.14
George Sr. finally gets a lawyer, but Michael learns of a mysterious witness. Buster pretends to be in a coma to avoid testifying.
51	11	"Family Ties"	Robert Berlinger	Ron Weiner	February 10, 2006	3AJD11	3.18
Michael hires a woman who may be just what the company needs–and who might also be his long-lost sister, Nellie (played by Jason Bateman's sister Justine).
52	12	"Exit Strategy"	Rebecca E. Asher	Mitchell Hurwitz & Jim Vallely	February 10, 2006	3AJD12	3.47
George Michael's surprise birthday party for Maeby lands her in big trouble; Michael and Buster make a startling discovery when they go to Iraq to rescue Gob.
53	13	"Development Arrested"	John Fortenberry	Story by : Richard Day & Mitchell Hurwitz; Teleplay by : Chuck Tatham & Jim Vallely	February 10, 2006	3AJD13	3.43
Michael is relieved to have all the charges against his father dropped and shocked to learn who holds the real power in his dysfunctional family.

== Reception ==
Season 3 received critical acclaim upon release. On Rotten Tomatoes, the season has an approval rating of 100% with an average score of 8.7 out of 10 based on 10 reviews. The website's critical consensus reads, "Arrested Development's solid third season plays out just like the first two: fast, funny, and with a felony charge." Sal Cinquemani of Slant Magazine wrote positive comments about the season, calling the show "[as] consistent a live-action comedy as one can hope for these days". The review praised the series' "[spouting of] dry, think-and-you-missed-it punchlines and plot points", ultimately giving the season 4 stars out of 4.

The season received several award nominations. In 2006, the third season received four Emmy nominations, for Outstanding Comedy Series, Outstanding Supporting Actor in a Comedy Series (Will Arnett), Outstanding Single-Camera Picture Editing for a Comedy Series and Outstanding Writing for a Comedy Series for the series finale "Development Arrested".

== Home media ==
The third season was released on DVD in region 1 on August 29, 2006, in region 2 on April 23, 2007 and in region 4 on December 6, 2006. Special features include commentary by creator Mitchell Hurwitz and cast members on "Forget Me Now", "Mr. F" and "Development Arrested"; deleted and extended scenes; blooper reel; "The Last Day on Location" featurette.
