= Prison Break-In =

- Arrested Development episode
- Michael (right) and Lucille (middle) speak with Gentles (left).
- Episode no.: Season 3 Episode 7
- Directed by: Robert Berlinger
- Written by: Karey Dornetto
- Cinematography by: Greg Harrington
- Editing by: Stuart Bass
- Production code: 3AJD08
- Original air date: December 12, 2005
- Running time: 22 minutes

Guest appearances
- James Lipton as Warden Stefan Gentles

Episode chronology
← Previous "The Ocean Walker"	Next → "Making a Stand"
- Arrested Development season 3

"Prison Break-In" is the seventh episode of the third season of the American television satirical sitcom Arrested Development. It is the 47th overall episode of the series, and was written by Karey Dornetto and directed by Robert Berlinger. It originally aired on Fox on December 12, 2005. Series star Jessica Walter said this was one of her favorite episodes of the series.

The series, narrated by Ron Howard, follows the Bluths, a formerly wealthy, dysfunctional family, who made their money from property development. The Bluth family consists of Michael, his twin sister Lindsay, his older brother Gob, his younger brother Buster, their mother Lucille and father George Sr., as well as Michael's son George Michael, and Lindsay and her husband Tobias' daughter Maeby. In the episode, Michael is worried when he finds out that the prison warden is dating his mother and that the Bluth Foundation dinner is being held in the prison's new wing.

== Plot ==
Michael (Jason Bateman) visits Lucille (Jessica Walter) to remind her that he needs her as the co-chair of the Bluth Foundation Dinner. Buster (Tony Hale) names his new pet turtle Mother and stores it in a box that Oscar (Jeffrey Tambor) uses to store marijuana. Warden Gentles (James Lipton) installs cameras in the penthouse to study George Sr. (Tambor). Lindsay (Portia de Rossi) tells Michael that this year's disease for the dinner is Graft-versus-host, which Tobias (David Cross) already suffers from with his hair transplant rejecting his body. Maeby (Alia Shawkat) asks George Michael (Michael Cera) to read New Warden, a screenplay by Warden Gentles. Michael finds Gentles and Lucille having a romantic meal.

Michael tells George Sr. about the dinner, but he already knew about it, and Michael realizes he is planning an escape attempt with Lucille to call him with the code to remove his ankle bracelet. Michael reads New Warden, where he learns Warden Gentles’ true intentions to use Lucille to get even with George Sr. and to give her chlamydia. George Sr. realizes that the papier mache replicas of his head will not fool the cameras but finds an unconscious Oscar and plans to hide in Gob's (Will Arnett) magic box. Michael asks Gob to help him break into the prison to save Lucille. Buster finds Oscar, who once again had been shaved to look like George Sr., and frees him, but the police quickly arrest him.

Michael and Gob arrive at the prison to stage their break-in, with Gob having drawn the prison blueprints on his stomach. A prison guard finds them but thinks they are part of the gala and motions them inside. In the prison, George Michael invites Maeby to pick a cell to share with him. In the warden's office, guards lead Oscar into Warden Gentles’ office. In the dining hall, Gob's video of Tobias begins playing. When the patrons learn that removing his hair plugs will cure Tobias, they grow unruly. Michael catches up with his mother in a conjugal trailer and begs her not to go through with her plans. When she resists, Michael tells her about the screenplay, which she knew about and in fact gave the warden the idea for chlamydia. George Sr. breaks into the trailer and demands that Lucille give their relationship one last shot. George Sr. admits that Oscar had been falsely arrested, and tells the warden that if he frees Oscar and gives George Sr. and Lucille one hour alone, they can call everything even, and the warden agrees.

=== On the next Arrested Development... ===
George Michael and Tobias get locked in a prison cell together, Buster breaks a guitar with his hook, and Gob sees Lucille and George Sr. having sex.

== Production ==
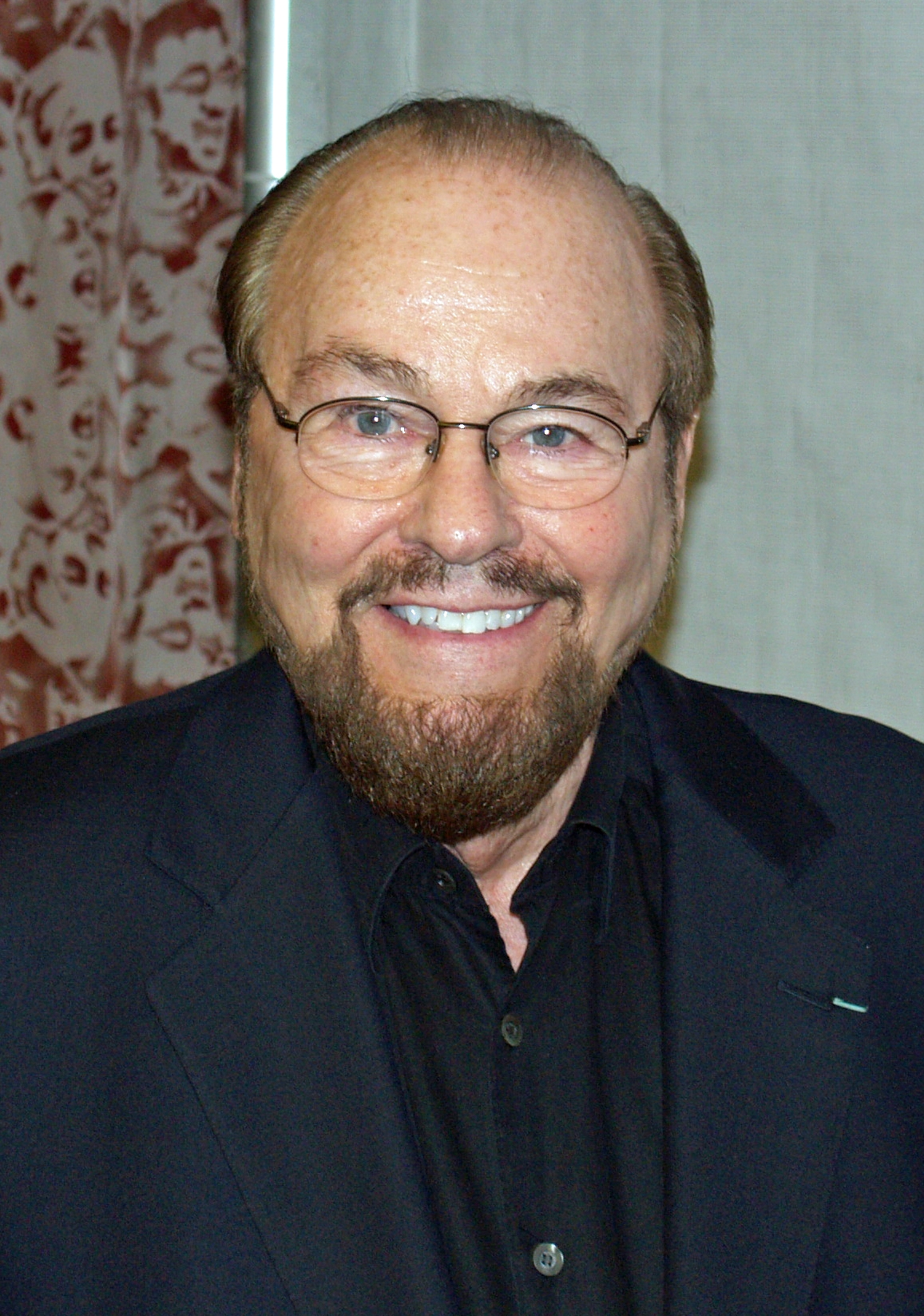
James Lipton (pictured) appears as Lucille's love interest, which Jessica Walter appreciated.

"Prison Break-In" was directed by Robert Berlinger and written by Karey Dornetto. It was Dornetto's first and only writing credit on Arrested Development. It was the eighth episode of the season to be filmed, despite being the seventh broadcast episode.

Walter remarked how "fun" it was to have James Lipton, a guest star, serve as Lucille's love interest. She also expressed shock at the fact that they were able to get away with a plot about chlamydia, calling it an example of the "very dirty" jokes that Arrested Development was allowed to do on network television.

The episode overall serves as a "half-hearted" parody of the Fox Network's series, Prison Break, both through its title and various other references to the series. "Prison Break-In" was first released on home video in the United States on August 29, 2006, in the Complete Third Season DVD box set.

== Reception ==
=== Viewers ===
In the United States, the episode was watched by 3.91 million viewers on its original broadcast.

=== Critical reception ===
The A.V. Club writer Noel Murray commented that "the callbacks in “Prison Break-In” are mostly very funny; and they do range from the recent to the (relatively) ancient." Murray then said that "What makes this episode more than just a scattered batch of in-jokes though is the return of Warden Gentles’ screenplay New Warden". Brian Tallerico from Vulture ranked the episode 71st out of the whole series, stating that "low point of Arrested Development’s initial three-season run would still be a decent episode of most other shows." Tallerico then said "It’s not that “Prison Break-In” is awful, just that it never comes together into the inspired comedy that defines most of the series."
