= Mr. F =

- Arrested Development episode
- Rita's "Mr. F" bracelet, as noticed by Michael (hand seen holding the bracelet).
- Episode no.: Season 3 Episode 5
- Directed by: Arlene Sanford
- Written by: Richard Day; Jim Vallely
- Cinematography by: Greg Harrington
- Editing by: Richard Candib
- Production code: 3AJD05
- Original air date: November 7, 2005
- Running time: 22 minutes

Guest appearances
- Charlize Theron as Rita; Dave Thomas as Trevor; Jeff Garlin as Mort Meyers; Bob Einstein as Larry; Scott Baio as Bob Loblaw; Justin Lee as Annyong Bluth; John Beard as himself; Frankie Muniz as himself (uncredited)

Episode chronology
← Previous "Notapusy"	Next → "The Ocean Walker"
- Arrested Development season 3

"Mr. F" is the fifth episode of the third season of the American television satirical sitcom Arrested Development. It is the 45th overall episode of the series, and was written by co-executive producers Richard Day and Jim Vallely, and directed by Arlene Sanford. It originally aired on Fox on November 7, 2005, airing back-to-back with the previous episode, "Notapusy".

The series, narrated by Ron Howard, follows the Bluths, a formerly wealthy, dysfunctional family, who made their money from property development. The Bluth family consists of Michael, his twin sister Lindsay, his older brother Gob, his younger brother Buster, their mother Lucille and father George Sr., as well as Michael's son George Michael, and Lindsay and her husband Tobias' daughter Maeby. In the episode, Gob tries to trick the company's Japanese investors by building a "Tiny Town", but Tobias ruins everything after he mistakes a CIA agent for a talent agent from CAA.

== Plot ==
Michael (Jason Bateman) and Rita (Charlize Theron) go to one of the Bluth Company's development properties, where he realizes that he may have a mole problem. At the gym, talented Tobias (David Cross) meets a CIA agent who he mistakes for a CAA agent. Michael, Lucille (Jessica Walter), Gob (Will Arnett), Buster (Tony Hale), and George Sr. (Jeffrey Tambor), via surrogate Larry (Bob Einstein), meet with Bob Loblaw (Scott Baio), who explains that the Japanese investors have heard about the mole problem. As a way to fool the investors, Gob suggests building a tiny model town, and Bob warns the family that no money should be transferred, as it will constitute fraud. Bob warns Michael that the family might have a "mole", or a spy, who may be British and goes by "Mr. F", and the family immediately suspects Rita, but Michael denies telling her anything.

Gob finds a train set, which he assumes is for him but is actually for George Michael, and assumes George Sr. has gone along with his "tiny town" idea. George Sr. finds a large air duct in the apartment and climbs into it, hoping it will lead him to freedom, but inadvertently gets trapped by Buster between the walls of the penthouse. Michael and Rita visit the movie studio Maeby (Alia Shawkat) is pretending to work at, and he notices her bracelet is engraved "MR F". Michael believes Rita and her Uncle Trevor (Dave Thomas), who previously threatened him, are spies and breaks up with her. George Michael tries to figure out how to use a jetpack that George Sr. had ordered.

Frank wires Tobias for the meeting with the Japanese investors, and Bob reminds Michael to make sure that his family does not deceive the Japanese investors or else they can all end up in prison, but Gob has already lined up the investors and opens the curtains to reveal his "tiny town". Surprisingly, the investors are pleased, but Tobias, dressed in a mole costume, walks over the hill and begins smashing the tiny houses, and George Michael, strapped into the jet pack, swoops out of the sky and knocks Tobias over, leading the investors to storm out in anger. Tobias admits that his friend Frank wanted him to be a mole, and Michael realizes that Rita is not a spy. Michael goes to Rita's apartment, where she is packing for her deportation to England, so he asks her to marry him so she can stay and get her green card. The CIA agents look at the file they have on Rita, which is marked "MR F", revealed now to be the acronym for "mentally retarded female".

=== On the next Arrested Development... ===
As George Sr. continues to travel through the vents, he comes across Annyong (Justin Lee), who has set up a secret communications base within the walls of the apartment. Michael and Rita drive together, preparing to get married.

== Production ==
"Mr. F" was directed by Arlene Sanford, and written by co-executive producers Richard Day and Jim Vallely. It was Day's second writing credit and Vallely's twelfth, and was the fifth episode of the season to be filmed.

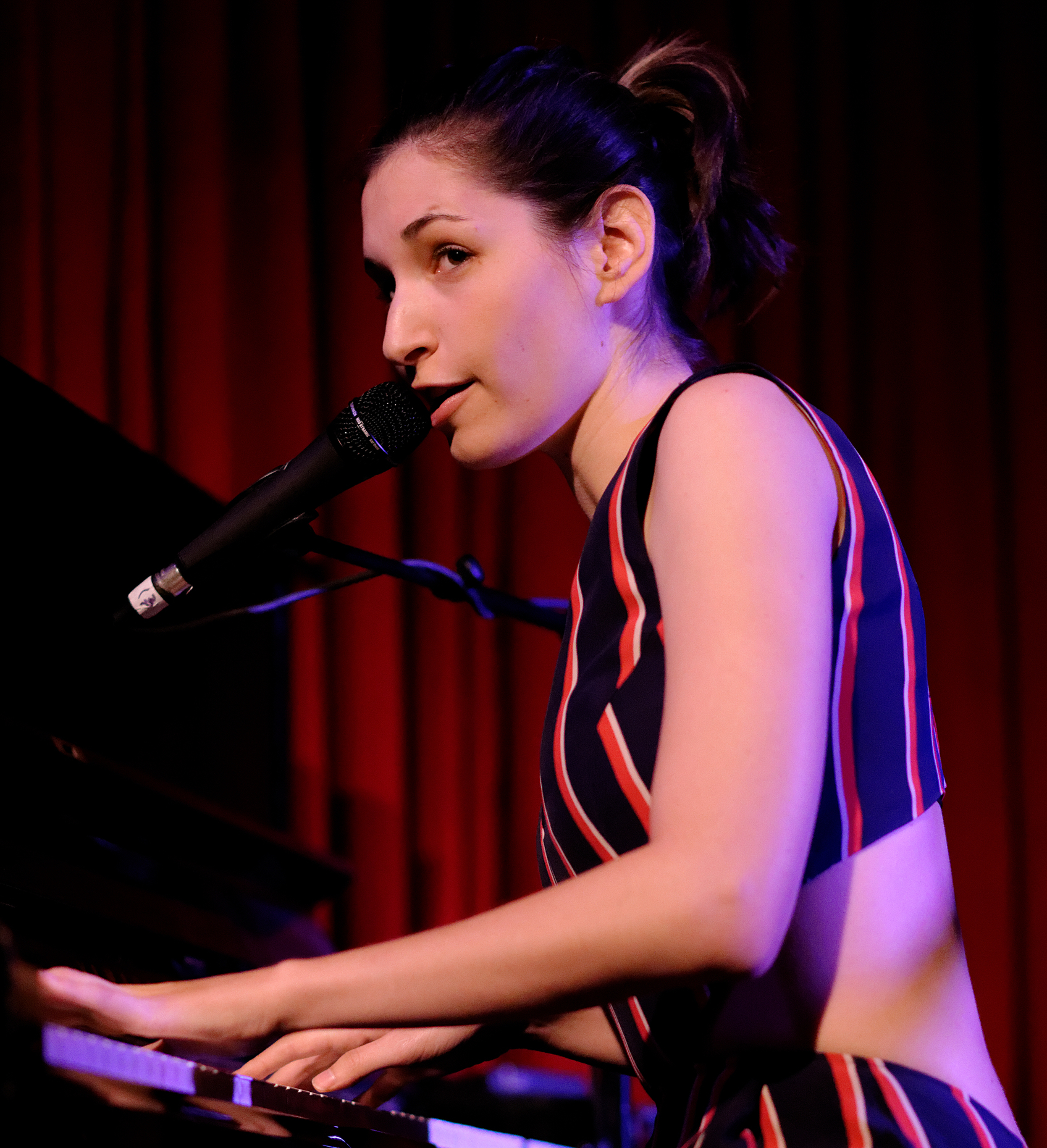
Lucy Schwartz (pictured) was asked by her father to sing the episode's titular jingle.

The repeated jingle introduced during the episode—singing "Mr. F"—was performed by series composer David Schwartz's daughter Lucy. She got the role after her father "poked his head" into her room while she was completing her homework, and he asked her to sing a jingle in a British accent, modeled in the style of a James Bond song, which series creator Mitchell Hurwitz requested for the next day.

According to Hurwitz, the episode intentionally poked fun at the aggressive ways that Broadcast Standards and Practices would censor the series; this was accomplished by having the narrator say, "And that's when Buster found his way around the sensors" before Buster makes an innuendo by commenting, "Oh, no, when Mom sees that she's gonna blow a cow". "Mr. F" was first released on home video in the United States on August 29, 2006, in the Complete Third Season DVD box set. In 2013, a soundtrack compiling every song from the first four seasons of the series entitled "At Long Last...Music and Songs From Arrested Development" was released, including the titular "Mr. F" jingle from the episode.

== Reception ==
=== Viewers ===
In the United States, the episode was watched by 3.94 million viewers during its original broadcast on November 7, 2005. It received a 1.4% share among adults between the ages of 18 and 49, meaning that it was seen by 1.4% of all households in that demographic. It marked a decrease in viewership from the previous episode, "Notapusy", which aired directly before it that same night, earned a 1.5% rating, and drew in 4.19 million viewers.

=== Critical reception ===
The A.V. Club writer Noel Murray commented on the episode and "The Ocean Walker", saying:

"I actually do believe that these six episodes [of the Rita arc] are consistently hilarious, overall. But I don't think that the reveal of Rita's retardation is especially clever in and of itself, except for its fleeting shock value, and its more significant satirical value."

Murray also comment of Charlize Theron's portrayal as Rita, calling her "pretty brilliant in this role". In his review of the third season, Brian Raftery of Entertainment Weekly praised the episode as an example of the season making "ingenious left-field comic turns", particularly through its conclusion involving the mole costume and the jet pack. Brian Tallerico from Vulture ranked the episode 46th out of the whole series, stating that the "funniest stuff in "Mr. F" is delightfully out there".
