= Family Ties (Arrested Development) =

- Arrested Development episode
- Episode no.: Season 3 Episode 11
- Directed by: Robert Berlinger
- Written by: Ron Weiner
- Cinematography by: Greg Harrington
- Editing by: Stuart Bass
- Production code: 3AJD11
- Original air date: February 10, 2006
- Running time: 22 minutes

Guest appearances
- Justine Bateman as Nellie; Rob Riggle as Congressman John Van Huesen

Episode chronology
← Previous "Fakin' It"	Next → "Exit Strategy"
- Arrested Development season 3

"Family Ties" is the eleventh episode of the third season of the American television satirical sitcom Arrested Development. It is the 51st overall episode of the series, and was written by supervising producer Ron Weiner and directed by Robert Berlinger. It originally aired on Fox on February 10, 2006, along with the previous episode, and the following two episodes in a two-hour block against NBC's coverage of the 2006 Winter Olympics opening ceremony.

The series, narrated by Ron Howard, follows the Bluths, a formerly wealthy, dysfunctional family, who made their money from property development. The Bluth family consists of Michael, his twin sister Lindsay, his older brother Gob, his younger brother Buster, their mother Lucille and father George Sr., as well as Michael's son George Michael, and Lindsay and her husband Tobias' daughter Maeby. In the episode, Michael hires a woman who may be just what the company needs–and who might also be his long-lost sister, Nellie (played by Jason Bateman's sister, Justine).

== Plot ==
Michael (Jason Bateman) and Lindsay (Portia de Rossi) theorize that their parents had given up Nellie (Justine Bateman), their older sister, years ago and ask Gob (Will Arnett) if he remembers growing up with a sister, but he says he does not. George Michael (Michael Cera) tells Maeby (Alia Shawkat) that their fake hospital wedding was real and shows the marriage certificate he got in the mail. Deciding to find out more about Nellie, Michael visits his parents and finds George Sr. (Jeffrey Tambor) surrounded by computer equipment from the Bluth Company's office, trying to delete incriminating evidence. Michael returns to the office and finds an old Kay-Pro computer containing what he thinks is information on his missing sister, printing off her phone number.

While visiting Buster (Tony Hale) in the hospital, Lucille (Jessica Walter) finds John Van Heusen (Rob Riggle) standing besides Buster's bed, protecting his right to life. Michael's search for Nellie turns up "Frank", an acquaintance of hers, who sets up a meeting for them at a hotel bar, where he feels a connection with Nellie that he has never felt with another family member. The next day Michael introduces Nellie to the company staff and plans to tell her that he thinks she's his sister over drinks that evening. Michael arrives for his meeting with Nellie to find Tobias (David Cross) waiting for his trainer, also called Michael. Nellie confesses that she's mildly attracted to Michael, but it's a setup for Michael to be confronted by her pimp, Frank. Recognizing the pimp's voice, Michael turns on the lights and discovers that Frank is Franklin, voiced by Gob.

Gob informs Michael that Nellie is a prostitute, and Michael reveals that he thinks she is their sister. Lindsay arrives for her date and finds Tobias sitting with fitness trainer Michael, whom she was also there to meet, with Michael thinking they were going to have a threesome. Michael confronts his father about Nellie, and George Sr. insists that Nellie is his prostitute, not his daughter. When Michael says he gave Nellie access to the "N. Bluth" account earlier, George Sr. rushes to his computer to try to close it, but it has already been emptied. The next day, Michael finds out that Nellie used the money to pay herself and the employees as well as upgrade the company's computers. Impressed by her handling of the situation, Michael offers Nellie a job, but she declines because she makes $300,000 a year in her current job.

=== On the next Arrested Development... ===
Gob has a religious conversion, and John Van Heusen gets into bed with Buster.

== Production ==
"Family Ties" was directed by Robert Berlinger and written by supervising producer Ron Weiner. It was Berlinger's third and final directing credit and Weiner's second and final writing credit. The episode features Justine Bateman, Jason Bateman's real life sister, as Nellie. It was the eleventh episode of the season to be filmed.

== Reception ==
=== Viewers ===
In the United States, the episode was watched by 3.18 million viewers on its original broadcast.

=== Critical reception ===
The A.V. Club writer Noel Murray praised the episode, saying "Neither “Family Ties” nor “Exit Strategy” is perfect, but both are well-oiled machines, chugging easily through a fine assortment of callbacks, meta-textual gags, sociopolitical satire, and double entendres." Brian Tallerico from Vulture ranked the episode 28th out of the whole series, calling the "reveal of Franklin/Gob as Nellie’s pimp is a season highlight."
