= Fakin' It (Arrested Development) =

- Arrested Development episode
- Episode no.: Season 3 Episode 10
- Directed by: Lev L. Spiro
- Written by: Dean Lorey; Chuck Tatham
- Cinematography by: Greg Harrington
- Editing by: Richard Candib
- Production code: 3AJD10
- Original air date: February 10, 2006
- Running time: 22 minutes

Guest appearances
- Judge Reinhold as himself; Carrie Preston as Jan Eagleman; John Michael Higgins as Wayne Jarvis; Bud Cort as himself

Episode chronology
← Previous "S.O.B.s"	Next → "Family Ties"
- Arrested Development season 3

"Fakin' It" is the tenth episode of the third season of the American television satirical sitcom Arrested Development. It is the 50th overall episode of the series, and was written by co-executive producers Dean Lorey and Chuck Tatham, and directed by Lev L. Spiro. It originally aired on Fox on February 10, 2006, along with the following three episodes in a two-hour block against NBC's coverage of the 2006 Winter Olympics opening ceremony.

The series, narrated by Ron Howard, follows the Bluths, a formerly wealthy, dysfunctional family, who made their money from property development. The Bluth family consists of Michael, his twin sister Lindsay, his older brother Gob, his younger brother Buster, their mother Lucille and father George Sr., as well as Michael's son George Michael, and Lindsay and her husband Tobias' daughter Maeby. In the episode, George Sr. finally gets a lawyer, but Michael learns of a mysterious witness, and Buster pretends to be in a coma so he does not have to testify.

== Plot ==
Michael (Jason Bateman) receives a witness list for his father's upcoming trial, which includes an N. Bluth, under which there is an account with money. George Sr. (Jeffrey Tambor) denies knowing who N. Bluth is, and Michael says that Jan Eagleman (Carrie Preston) wants to put the family through a mock trial. Michael meets with Jan and Judge Reinhold, who want to conduct the mock trial on a TV show. At the hospital, Buster (Tony Hale) is in a coma, and Gob (Will Arnett) says that he had taken his forget-me-now pills. Michael tells the family that he will play their defense lawyer in the mock trial, and a doctor tells them that Buster was possibly faking the coma.

George Michael (Michael Cera) volunteers at the hospital to put on a fake wedding for Alzheimer's patients with Maeby (Alia Shawkat). Michael finds a secret room in the model home and discovers his birth certificate with his name listed as "Nichael Bluth", leading him to suspect he is being set up to go to prison. George Michael tries to convince Maeby to join his plan, and she agrees, thinking it will be a good twist on a wedding movie. Michael shows the "Nichael" birth certificate to George Sr., who claims it is a coincidence and accuses Michael of not being able to handle the family's defense. George Michael and Maeby have their first mock wedding, but she runs away. Wayne Jarvis (John Michael Higgins), the real prosecutor, approaches Michael.

Wayne warns Michael that due to the Patriot Act, anything said in the mock trial is legally binding and that if Michael does not get his father on the stand, the government will go after "N. Bluth," whom they suspect is Michael. George Michael finds Maeby hiding and tries to persuade her into kissing but is interrupted by Michael barging in looking for evidence. Lindsay (Portia de Rossi) and Tobias (David Cross) argue over their marriage, and Buster sits upright yelling at them to fake it before falling back into his coma. The next day, the mock trial begins, and Michael calls a surprise witness to the stand: Franklin Delano Bluth, Gob's puppet. Michael announces to the court that he was approached by the prosecution and asked to implicate his family, and Gob plays a tape of Wayne telling Michael they would go after N. Bluth, leading Judge Reinhold to declare a mistrial. George Michael and Maeby attend another fake wedding, but a real priest officiates it, leaving them legally married.

== Production ==
"Fakin' It" was directed by Lev L. Spiro, and written by co-executive producers Dean Lorey and Chuck Tatham. It was Spiro's second and final directing credit, Lorey's first writing credit and Tatham's second writing credit. It was the tenth episode of the season to be filmed.

== Reception ==
=== Viewers ===
In the United States, the episode was watched by 3.14 million viewers on its original broadcast.

=== Critical reception ===
The A.V. Club writer Noel Murray commented on the episode being "noteworthy for the introduction of “N. Bluth,” the name that Michael discovers on the witness list for George Sr.’s trial". Brian Tallerico from Vulture ranked the episode 22nd out of the whole series.
