= The Ocean Walker =

- Arrested Development episode
- Episode no.: Season 3 Episode 6
- Directed by: Paul Feig
- Written by: Jake Farrow; Sam Laybourne
- Cinematography by: Greg Harrington
- Editing by: Stuart Bass
- Production code: 3AJD06
- Original air date: December 5, 2005
- Running time: 22 minutes

Guest appearances
- Charlize Theron as Rita; Dave Thomas as Trevor; Bob Einstein as Larry

Episode chronology
← Previous "Mr. F"	Next → "Prison Break-In"
- Arrested Development season 3

"The Ocean Walker" is the sixth episode of the third season of the American television satirical sitcom Arrested Development. It is the 46th overall episode of the series, and was written by Jake Farrow and Sam Laybourne, and directed by Paul Feig. It originally aired on Fox on December 5, 2005. The episode is series creator Mitchell Hurwitz's second favorite episode.

The series, narrated by Ron Howard, follows the Bluths, a formerly wealthy, dysfunctional family, who made their money from property development. The Bluth family consists of Michael, his twin sister Lindsay, his older brother Gob, his younger brother Buster, their mother Lucille and father George Sr., as well as Michael's son George Michael, and Lindsay and her husband Tobias' daughter Maeby. In the episode, when Michael decides to marry Rita, his parents oppose the idea until they learn she's worth millions of dollars. His second thoughts come when he discovers that she's mentally disabled.

== Plot ==
Michael (Jason Bateman) informs George Sr. (Jeffrey Tambor) and Lucille (Jessica Walter) that he plans to marry Rita (Charlize Theron); they doubt his decision. Michael wonders whether Rita is just using him for a green card; Lindsay (Portia de Rossi) suggests getting a hotel room for the evening. Gob (Will Arnett) prepares a magic trick for the wedding, and Rita expresses interest in his magic, so Gob plans to involve her. George Michael (Michael Cera) drives Rita to Wee Britain so she can prepare for her night with Michael, but he becomes concerned by her behavior. While Rita packs for her sleepover, her Uncle Trevor (Dave Thomas) forbids the wedding and keeps Rita from leaving by placing "invisible" locks on the doors. Michael waits for Rita, but she never arrives.

Michael drives to Wee Britain to call off the wedding, and Rita explains the invisible locks. Michael and Rita escape through a window. Trevor arrives at the Bluth apartment, adamantly declaring his opposition to the wedding, and reveals the truth about Rita's fortune and her mental condition. George Sr. and Lucille tell Trevor that Michael probably has no idea about either of these things. Trevor vows to stop the wedding, so George Sr. and Lucille misdirect him to Legoland. After Trevor leaves, they support the marriage, preoccupied with Rita's apparent wealth.

Michael and Rita are at the hotel when George Michael tells Michael about his suspicions that Rita might be intellectually disabled. He shows Michael footage of Rita's behavior that he filmed earlier. Michael recalls Rita's past behavior and tells her they should wait until they are married before they are intimate. Michael prepares to let Rita down gently the next morning when he is caught off guard by his family and a surprise wedding. During a family discussion, George Sr. makes an aside about Rita being retarded, leading Michael to realize his family set up the wedding to get Rita's money and storms off. Michael tells George Michael that the relationship would not work because she is retarded, just as Rita and Lindsay return. Deeply hurt and embarrassed, Rita runs off, with Michael going after her. Michael explains to Rita that things could not work between them and she realizes she must go back to England with Trevor. Rita walks away over a swimming pool, and Michael asks Gob if it was a part of his magic trick, but he denies it.

=== On the next Arrested Development... ===
Gob explains that Rita walking on water was part of his illusion, and he releases lighter fluid, with chaos ensuing.

== Production ==
"The Ocean Walker" was directed by Paul Feig, and written by Jake Farrow and Sam Laybourne. It was Feig's seventh and final writing credit, and Farrow and Laybourne's first and only writing credits. It was the sixth episode of the season to be filmed.

== Reception ==
=== Viewers ===
In the United States, the episode was watched by 4.09 million viewers on its original broadcast.

=== Critical reception ===
The A.V. Club writer Noel Murray commented on the episode and "Mr. F", saying:

"I actually do believe that these six episodes [of the Rita arc] are consistently hilarious, overall. But I don't think that the reveal of Rita's retardation is especially clever in and of itself, except for its fleeting shock value, and its more significant satirical value."

Murray also comment of Charlize Theron's portrayal as Rita, calling her "pretty brilliant in this role". Brian Tallerico from Vulture ranked the episode 58th out of the whole series, stating that "This is the point when the Rita arc had run its course, and the episode is just one long joke about her mental ability and Michael’s inability to see it." In contrast, series creator Mitchell Hurwitz ranked "The Ocean Walker" as his second favorite episode of the show.

=== Accolades ===
Stuart Bass was nominated for Outstanding Single-Camera Picture Editing for a Comedy Series at the 58th Primetime Emmy Awards for "The Ocean Walker".
