= Notapusy =

- Arrested Development episode
- Episode no.: Season 3 Episode 4
- Directed by: Lev L. Spiro
- Written by: Ron Weiner
- Cinematography by: Greg Harrington
- Editing by: Stuart Bass
- Production code: 3AJD04
- Original air date: November 7, 2005
- Running time: 22 minutes

Guest appearances
- Charlize Theron as Rita; Dave Thomas as Trevor; Justin Grant Wade as Steve Holt; Bob Einstein as Larry; Mae Whitman as Ann Veal; Jamie Kennedy as himself; Scott Baio as Bob Loblaw; Nathalia Ramos as Hope Loblaw

Episode chronology
← Previous "Forget-Me-Now"	Next → "Mr. F"
- Arrested Development season 3

"Notapusy" is the fourth episode of the third season of the American television satirical sitcom Arrested Development. It is the 44th overall episode of the series, and was written by supervising producer Ron Weiner and directed by Lev L. Spiro. It originally aired on Fox on November 7, 2005, airing back-to-back with the follow-up episode, "Mr. F".

The series, narrated by Ron Howard, follows the Bluths, a formerly wealthy, dysfunctional family, who made their money from property development. The Bluth family consists of Michael, his twin sister Lindsay, his older brother Gob, his younger brother Buster, their mother Lucille and father George Sr., as well as Michael's son George Michael, and Lindsay and her husband Tobias' daughter Maeby. In the episode, Michael volunteers to participate in the father-son triathlon with Gob's son to prove his masculinity to Rita. Maeby attempts to expose the hypocrisy of an "Inner Beauty Contest" by appearing as her disabled alter-ego, Surely. George Sr. mistakenly delivers a "Startled Straight" lecture to a gathering of gay men.

== Plot ==
Rita (Charlize Theron) calls Michael (Jason Bateman) a "pussy", which Michael takes for an insult. Ann (Mae Whitman) is entering an "inner beauty pageant" at an upcoming fair. Maeby (Alia Shawkat) informs George Michael (Michael Cera) that there is no such thing as an "inner beauty" pageant; the girl with the best looks always wins. Lindsay (Portia de Rossi) coaches Bob Loblaw's (Scott Baio) daughter Hope (Nathalia Ramos) in the pageant. Tobias (David Cross) considers the pageant a way to gain respect from Lindsay and coaches Ann. Gob (Will Arnett) informs Michael that Steve Holt (Justin Grant Wade) wants to enter the father-son triathlon with him. Michael agrees to compete with Steve and prove to Rita he is athletic.

Maeby enters the pageant as her wheelchair-using alter ego Surely to prove that Surely's physical disabilities and lack of beauty will disqualify her, but the organizers accommodate Surely's disability. Lucille (Jessica Walter) meets with Bob Loblaw to find a way to keep Buster (Tony Hale) out of the army, and Bob says that Buster can recruit someone to replace him. Bob suggests to Michael that George Sr. (Jeffrey Tambor) improve his image by leading a "Startled Straight" program designed to reform "at-risk male youths".

Steve gives Michael OxyContin pills, which Steve believes to be pills filled with oxygen. Maeby tries to get kicked out of the pageant to no avail. George Sr. arrives to speak at "Startled Straight", but it turns out to be a different event to prevent men from becoming homosexuals; when he gives a speech about the horrors of prison to a group of young gay males, it does not go as he expected. Surely makes it to the finals of the pageant, alongside Hope and Ann. When Maeby stands up from her wheelchair, the crowd mistakes it for a miracle, increasing her popularity. Slightly dazed from the pills, Michael arrives with Steve at the triathlon course, which is intended for children. George Michael congratulates Ann on taking third place in the pageant, and she tells him that she has met a new man; George Michael decides to sign up for the army to prove himself to Ann. Michael goes to stop George Michael when he is noticed by Rita, while George Sr. decides to make a getaway. Michael convinces George Michael not to enlist. Rita tells Michael that he was quite a man, a complete and utter "pussy".

=== On the next Arrested Development... ===
Buster signs Steve up for the army, but Gob interrupts, saying he is ready to be a father. George Sr. gets pulled over by a police car.

== Production ==
"Notapusy" was directed by Lev L. Spiro and written by supervising producer Ron Weiner. It was Spiro's first directing credit and Weiner's first writing credit. It was the fourth episode of the season to be filmed.

== Reception ==
=== Viewers ===
In the United States, the episode was watched by 4.19 million viewers on its original broadcast.

=== Critical reception ===
The A.V. Club writer Noel Murray commented on how the "episode is little more than a collection of gags and sketches, very loosely motivated." Brian Tallerico from Vulture ranked the episode 53th out of the whole series, saying:

"There's a lot of dwindling plots in "Notapusy" as season three treads water before we get to the big Rita reveal, and the puns — like Ann's "Camel Tow" and Michael taking Oxycontin for incontinence — feel like jokes that should've been cut."
