= Making a Stand =

- Arrested Development episode
- Episode no.: Season 3 Episode 8
- Directed by: Peter Lauer
- Written by: Mitchell Hurwitz; Chuck Tatham
- Cinematography by: Greg Harrington
- Editing by: Richard Candib
- Production code: 3AJD07
- Original air date: December 19, 2005
- Running time: 22 minutes

Guest appearances
- Jeff Garlin as Mort Meyers; Steve Ryan as J. Walter Weatherman; Justin Grant Wade as Steve Holt; Scott Baio as Bob Loblaw

Episode chronology
← Previous "Prison Break-In"	Next → "S.O.B.s"
- Arrested Development season 3

"Making a Stand" is the eighth episode of the third season of the American television satirical sitcom Arrested Development. It is the 48th overall episode of the series, and was written by series creator Mitchell Hurwitz and co-executive producer Chuck Tatham, and directed by Peter Lauer. It originally aired on Fox on December 12, 2005. The episode is Hurwitz's joint-favorite episode, the other being "Pier Pressure", while also making the Parents Television Council's Worst Primetime TV Show of the Week list for the first week of 2006 due to its "graphic violence and dysfunction."

The series, narrated by Ron Howard, follows the Bluths, a formerly wealthy, dysfunctional family, who made their money from property development. The Bluth family consists of Michael, his twin sister Lindsay, his older brother Gob, his younger brother Buster, their mother Lucille and father George Sr., as well as Michael's son George Michael, and Lindsay and her husband Tobias' daughter Maeby. In the episode, after yet another instance of George Sr. pitting Michael and Gob against each other, Michael decides to teach his father a lesson.

== Plot ==
Gob (Will Arnett) tries to introduce his new business idea of selling the Bluth Company blueprints to Colombians, but is shot down by Michael (Jason Bateman). Lucille (Jessica Walter) has enlisted painters to give the apartment a new paint job while she recuperates from her upcoming cosmetic surgery in the model home. Michael finds out that Gob's Colombian plan had been instigated by George Sr. (Jeffrey Tambor) and feels that his father is still trying to create tension between Michael and his brother. Buster (Tony Hale) gets a job at an Iraqi toy shop, but upon finding out that the toy shop owner wanted to employ him to use his lack of a hand to scare off shoplifters, he quits. At a test screening of the studio's new horror movie, Maeby (Alia Shawkat) sees that the audience finds the horror aspects laughable, and her boss Mort Meyers (Jeff Garlin) tells her that she has a week to fix the problem. Michael suggests that Gob opens a banana stand of his own, and later George Michael (Michael Cera) calls Michael to inform him that Gob and Steve Holt (Justin Wade Grant) have set up the new banana stand a short distance from the original banana stand to be a competitor.

Bob Loblaw (Scott Baio) introduces a young inexperienced attorney to Lindsay to act as her new representative, and Lindsay finds out that Loblaw has defected to be Tobias's (David Cross) attorney. Buster brings a post-operation Lucille, covered in bandages and unable to speak properly, to the model home, and tells Michael that he saw J. Walter Weatherman (Steve Ryan). Michael and George Michael, the latter in a banana-suit, visit Gob's stand. In the middle of the night, Maeby is surprised by the red, blistered, and bruised face of a post-facelift Lucille, screaming then realizing that she has found the face of the monster to save her horror movie. At the banana stands, Michael and Gob are embroiled in competition using increasingly desperate tactics. Michael finds out that George Sr. was behind the banana stand idea as a way of laundering money for the Colombian deal and formulates a plan for the two brothers to get back on their father. Gob and Michael decide to include J. Walter Weatherman in their plan and tell their father that they have put a stop to the Colombian deal. They warn him that the Colombians may have reason for revenge, and Michael asks the painters working in the apartment to help out with the plan by posing as kidnappers while Gob tells his father that Michael is planning to fake a kidnapping to scare him.

Bob Loblaw uses his knowledge of Lindsay's flirtation with him as evidence in trying to win the case for Tobias. Maeby's scary photograph of Lucille is met with approval from Mort, and George Sr. is felled into a metal trunk by one of his disgruntled disguised employees. While he is trapped, Michael and Gob set about rebuilding Gob's banana stand inside the apartment to pass off as a South American hut. Once George Sr. is released from the trunk inside the fake hut, he is greeted by Gob, Michael, and the painters disguised in balaclavas, who then attempt to threaten and frighten him. Just as Michael is about to reveal his identity, George Sr. grabs a gun and starts shooting. After a man's arm flies off, Michael realizes that it was J. Walter Weatherman and that George Sr. had set them up. As Gob and Michael start to fight because Gob had spoiled the plan, they roll out of the hut, and Michael appears to fall over the balcony. Michael reappears unhurt, having taught his own lesson to his father. Buster picks up a gun and is targeted by policemen wielding guns themselves, who shoot when Buster does not drop the weapon as ordered. His hand flies off, spurting blood, causing Gob, Michael and George Sr. to panic, but Michael quickly realizes that it was Buster's fake hand that was shot off and that Buster was teaching them a lesson.

=== On the next Arrested Development... ===
Maeby uses Lucille's facelifted face for her horror film Gangy, and Mort suggests starting production on Gangy 2.

== Production ==
"Making a Stand" was directed by Peter Lauer, and written by series creator Mitchell Hurwitz and co-executive producer Chuck Tatham. It was Lauer's third and final directing credit, Hurwitz's 17th writing credit and Tatham's first writing credit. It was the seventh episode of the season to be filmed.

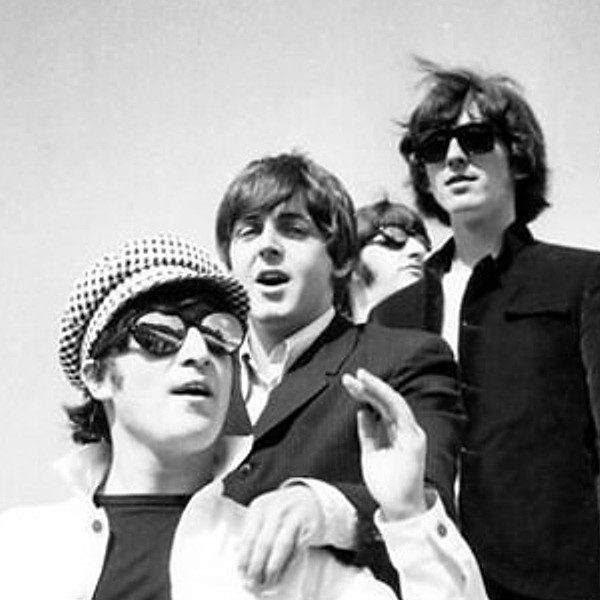
The song "Yellow Boat" parodies the Beatles (pictured) song "Yellow Submarine".

In the episode, Lucille is portrayed bruised and bandaged after an operation. Jessica Walter, who portrays Lucille, recalled that it took about two hours to get her face into that specific makeup. Whilst walking around sets between filming scenes, someone took a picture of Walter in the makeup; she was given the picture, and kept it years later. "Making a Stand" contains the reappearance of the one-armed man that George Sr. used to teach the children a lesson in "Pier Pressure". Series creator Mitchell Hurwitz later expressed that he thought the number of twists involving the one-armed man was "absurd", and so they only inserted as much as would be reasonable for the audience to understand.

In the episode, a montage of music occurs, including "Yellow Boat", a parody of The Beatles' Yellow Submarine composed by David Schwartz. To make the song sound as authentic as possible, Schwartz took inspiration from John Lennon and Paul McCartney's musical style, two people who heavily inspired him as a composer. However, he also made the song distinct enough to fit the perimeters of being a parodic work, including clanging bells in the background of the track.

The episode was first released on home video in the United States on August 29, 2006, in the Complete Third Season DVD box set. In 2013, a soundtrack compiling every song from the first four seasons of the series entitled "At Long Last...Music and Songs From Arrested Development" was released, including "The Yellow Boat" from the episode.

== Reception ==
=== Viewers ===
In the United States, the episode was watched by 4.14 million viewers on its original broadcast.

=== Critical reception ===
The A.V. Club writer Noel Murray commented that "while “Making A Stand” isn’t as good as “Pier Pressure,” that’s mainly because “Pier Pressure” is one of the funniest TV episodes of all time." Murray then stated that "The whole lesson-teaching enterprise culminates in one of Arrested Development’s best farcical set-pieces," and that it is "one of the best at showing GOB in all of his arrogance, ignorance and insecurity".

Brian Tallerico from Vulture ranked the episode 29th out of the whole series, saying that "After hitting a typical midpoint sag, “Making a Stand” was the bounce-back episode of season three". Series creator Mitchell Hurwitz ranked "Making a Stand" as his joint-favorite episode of the show with "Pier Pressure". In contrast, the episode also made the Parents Television Council's Worst Primetime TV Show of the Week list for the first week of 2006 due to its "graphic violence and dysfunction."
