= Exit Strategy (Arrested Development) =

- Arrested Development episode
- Buster (right) poses for a photo with one of the Saddam Hussein look-alikes (left).
- Episode no.: Season 3 Episode 12
- Directed by: Rebecca E. Asher
- Written by: Mitchell Hurwitz; Jim Vallely
- Cinematography by: Greg Harrington
- Editing by: Richard Candib
- Production code: 3AJD12
- Original air date: February 10, 2006
- Running time: 22 minutes

Guest appearances
- Gary Cole as Richard Shaw; Richard Belzer as Detective Munch; John Michael Higgins as Wayne Jarvis; James Evans as Saddam Hussein

Episode chronology
← Previous "Family Ties"	Next → "Development Arrested"
- Arrested Development season 3

"Exit Strategy" is the twelfth and penultimate episode of the third season of the American television satirical sitcom Arrested Development. It was written by series creator Mitchell Hurwitz and co-executive producer Jim Vallely, and directed by Rebecca E. Asher. It originally aired on the Fox Network on February 10, 2006, along with the two previous episodes, and the following episode in a two-hour block competing against the 2006 Winter Olympics opening ceremony.

The series, narrated by Ron Howard, follows the Bluths, a formerly wealthy dysfunctional family that made its money in property development. In the episode, Michael and Buster head to Iraq to get Gob out of prison, where they learn new information regarding George Sr.'s arrest from the CIA. Meanwhile, Tobias is part of a sting by the prosecution to learn more information about George Sr., while George Michael's surprise birthday party for Maeby both gets her fired and brings the two of them closer.

The episode features a cameo by Richard Belzer as his character John Munch, which inspired two theories about extended universes. Upon airing, "Exit Strategy" received generally positive reviews from critics, with series creator Mitchell Hurwitz listing it as his joint-favorite episode of the series. It has received thematic analysis from both scholars and critics, mainly for its commentary on the Iraq War.

== Plot ==
Michael Bluth (Jason Bateman) and his sister Lindsay (Portia de Rossi) prepare for their deposition in their father George Sr.'s (Jeffrey Tambor) trial regarding his work with Saddam Hussein. Then, Lindsay's husband Tobias (David Cross) walks in, revealing he has been asked to speak with the prosecution, and Michael realizes they are trying to get Tobias to flip sides. Michael's son George Michael (Michael Cera) asks Lindsay and Tobias what they are going to do for their daughter Maeby's (Alia Shawkat) upcoming birthday, which they forgot about; to make Maeby feel better, George Michael plans a party himself. Michael's brother Gob (Will Arnett) reveals that he is going to Iraq for a magic show, but Michael tells him not to.

The prosecution offers Tobias a bribe for information on the Bluths, but he declines, and, storming outside, sees a flyer for a scrapbooking class, which he takes; this is a sting by the prosecution, who uses the scrapbooking to get Tobias to write down his family's secrets. The prosecution reveals that Gob has been imprisoned, so Michael and his brother Buster (Tony Hale) go to Iraq to bail him out. George Michael calls all the numbers in Maeby's address book for the party, but, unbeknownst to him, he has called all her co-workers at the movie studio she conned her way into working for; realizing Maeby is 16, they fire her. Michael and Buster find Gob in a cell, who reveals that he was arrested after his trick turned into an unintentional protest against George W. Bush. Despite Michael's assumption that it would take longer, Gob is out of prison in mere minutes.

They go to one of the Iraq model homes that George Sr. helped build, where they find a family of Hussein look-alikes. Michael agrees to inspect the air conditioning, but finds a secret room containing a bombshell, only for the CIA, who rigged Gob's quick exoneration, to walk in and arrest them. However, the bombshell is fake and is a CIA recording device. In America, Maeby goes to her party, and, after George Michael reveals they might not be cousins, the two kiss. The CIA reveals that George Sr. was a patsy, and that they plan on killing the three of them before this comes out; Buster sends the recording to the public, and the Bluths are subsequently exempt from their treason charges.

== Production ==
"Exit Strategy" was directed by Rebecca E. Asher and written by series creator Mitchell Hurwitz and co-executive producer Jim Vallely. It was Hurwitz's 18th writing credit for the series, and Vallely's 14th. It was the twelfth and penultimate episode of the season to be filmed.

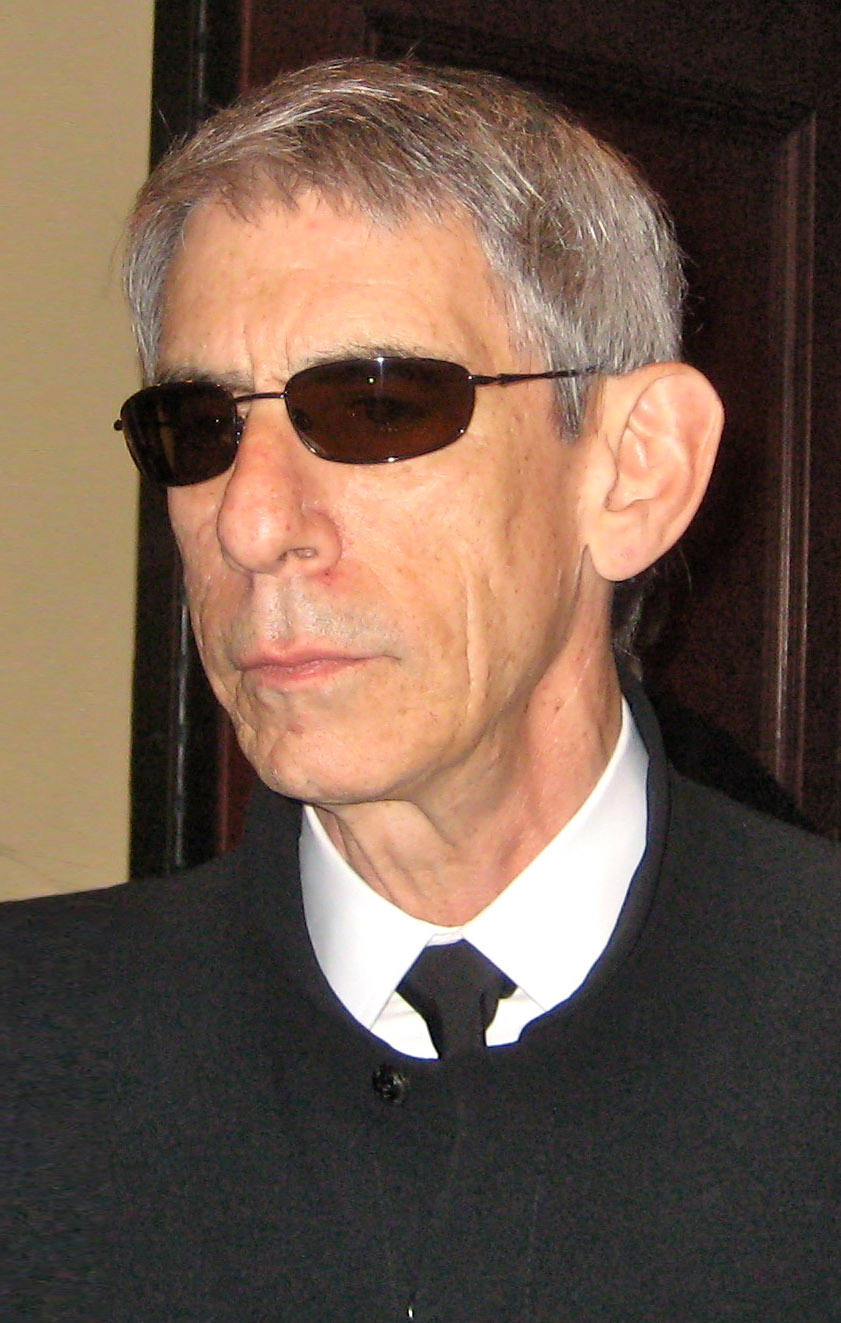
Richard Belzer cameos in the episode, playing his character John Munch.

In "Exit Strategy", Richard Belzer appears as John Munch, his character from Homicide: Life on the Street and Law and Order: Special Victims Unit that often cameos in other series. One of the Saddam Hussein look-alikes is portrayed by Larry Thomas, who is known for playing the Soup Nazi on Seinfeld; his role as Hussein has been interpreted as a reference to Seinfeld. The title refers to both how "exit strategies" were a hot-button discussion point at the time, and the fact that the writers of the series had to quickly finish up its narrative when the season's episode-count was shortened.

== Themes and analysis ==
The episode serves as the conclusion to the series' long-standing satire of the Iraq War, utilizing both Saddam Hussein and a reference to the torture and prison abuse of Abu Ghraib as a way to effectively cap off its commentary. It also deals with the political climate of the Bush administration, with analysis offered by George Sr.'s Iraq profiteering. It continues the series' lampoon of the American campaign in Iraq, but also uses a new approach of creating genuinely poignant political satire, according to Joseph Walker, not using references to get its point across, instead tackling the issues head-on with its own personal opinion. Authors Douglas Paletta and Paul Franco felt that the episode solidified George Sr. as guilty of treason, finally giving a straightforward answer as to whether or not the Bluth Company really did help Saddam Hussein build homes—something the series alludes to many times over the past three seasons.

The scene of CIA West and CIA East—two divisions of the CIA that are directly next to each other—being only one cubicle apart but still not knowing what the other is doing has been interpreted as political commentary. Each excuse that the members of the Bluth family makes encapsulate their key traits, according to Collider writer S.K. Sapiano, as their "ridiculous[ness]" being typical of the family. The episode touches on the topic of inter-cousin marriage, as does the rest of the third season, somewhat expanding on a storyline from the previous episode where Maeby and George Michael discover they accidentally got married. It also shows how much George Michael cares about Maeby, as he is the only person in the Bluth family to remember her birthday, but this continues the taboo relationship between them, as it results in them reaching "second base".

== Release and reception ==
"Exit Strategy" was first broadcast on February 10, 2006, on the Fox Network at 10:00 p.m. Eastern Standard Time in the United States; it aired during a four-episode marathon that day, where the preceding two episodes aired directly before it, along with the finale right after it. In the United States, the episode was watched by 3.47 million viewers on its original broadcast, receiving a 1.2% share among adults between the ages of 18 and 49, meaning that it was seen by 1.2% of all households in that demographic; this made it the highest-rated episode of the batch. The episode was first released on home video in the United States on August 29, 2006, in the Complete Third Season DVD box set.

The A.V. Club writer Noel Murray felt that the episode repeated previous parts of the series in some places, but still enjoyed its new approaches to storytelling that proved unique. Murray also praised "Exit Strategy" for its number of callbacks, metatextual humor, and satire of the Iraq war. Brian Tallerico from Vulture ranked the episode 47th out of the whole series, finding it to get to a state of "ridiculousness" that it fails to capture well. However, Tallerico found the scenes between Buster and his nurse to be humorous.

Series creator Mitchell Hurwitz ranked it as his joint-favorite episode of the show with "Development Arrested", noting that it helped wrap up the series. It was ranked as the tenth best episode of Arrested Development by ComicBook.com's Emma McKenna, praising its high-stakes narrative, performance from Jason Bateman and Tony Hale, and ability to balance a coherent story with consistent humor. McKenna felt it was a notable episode for bringing the series to a new, unique location, which proved "farcical".

=== Extended universe theories ===
Since airing, "Exit Strategy" has been used as example of the theory that Richard Belzer's character John Munch connects multiple different television series through a shared universe where John exists in each, as Belzer has appeared in dozens of shows as him. Another similar theory uses the episode's guest appearance of Munch to explain the "Tommy Westphall Universe" theory, which suggests that, since the series St. Elsewhere ends with the plot-twist that it was all in the mind of a little boy, every series that it crossed-over with also was part of this fantasy; through a series of elaborate connections between multiple different programs, Munch, and, as an extension, multiple other shows, are connected to Arrested Development.
