= 30-Love =

- Directed by: Robert Cannon
- Written by: Robert Cannon; Ira Heffler
- Produced by: Robert Cannon; Ira Heffler; Lisa Rau
- Starring: Robert Cannon; Brenda Vaccaro; Justin Lee
- Production companies: Cannonball of Death; Easy Open Productions
- Distributed by: Indie Rights
- Release date: September 28, 2017
- Running time: 99 minutes
- Country: United States
- Language: English
- Budget: $30,000
- Box office: $4,392

30-Love is a 2017 American comedy-drama film directed by Robert Cannon and starring Robert Cannon, Brenda Vaccaro, and Justin Lee.

== Premise ==
Kelly's husband (Cannon) returns home after Kelly dies in hospital. Struggling with raising their daughter as a single parent, he chooses to instead focus on Kelly's passion for tennis. Focused on winning a tournament in her honor, he neglects raising their daughter and soon finds himself having to fight to keep his parental rights.

== Cast ==
- Robert Cannon as Kelly's Husband
- Brenda Vaccaro as Hellen
- Justin Lee as Johnnie
- Mark Gagliardi as David
- Robert Craighead as Fred

== Release ==
30-Love raised over $10,000 on IndieGoGo for the film's premiere. It opened at the Vista Theater and had a one-week run at the Los Feliz 3 Theater.

== Reception ==
30-Love received mixed reviews. Entertainment Monthly commented positively on the production quality but were not impressed with the story. Other critics were more positive with their reviews and appreciated the non-conventional ending.
