= Sneakerheads (TV series) =

2020 American comedy web television series

- Genre: Comedy
- Created by: Jay Longino
- Starring: Allen Maldonado; Andrew Bachelor; Jearnest Corchado; Matthew Josten; Yaani King; Justin Lee; Aja Evans
- Music by: Haim Mazar
- Country of origin: United States
- Original language: English
- No. of seasons: 1
- No. of episodes: 6

Production
- Executive producers: Inny Clemons; Jay Longino; Will Gluck; Richard Schwartz; Jason Belleville; Dave Meyers; Brendan Bragg; Kevin Mann; Justin Killion; Rod Grable
- Producers: Christopher Boyd; Toby Louie; Andrew Bachelor; Allen Maldonado
- Cinematography: Scott Cunningham
- Editors: David Blackburn; Gena Fridman
- Running time: 22–24 minutes
- Production companies: Secret Society Films; Size 13 Productions; Olive Bridge Entertainment; Haven Entertainment; Complex Networks

Original release
- Network: Netflix
- Release: September 25, 2020

Sneakerheads is an American comedy television series created by Jay Longino that premiered on Netflix on September 25, 2020.

== Cast and characters ==
- Allen Maldonado as Devin
- Andrew Bachelor as Bobby
- Jearnest Corchado as Nori
- Matthew Josten as Stuey
- Yaani King as Christine
- Justin Lee as Cole
- Aja Evans as Gia

== Episodes ==
No.	Title	Directed by	Written by	Original release date
1	"100% Pure Adrenaline"	Dave Meyers	Jay Longino	September 25, 2020
2	"Hustling Backwards"	Dave Meyers	Jason Belleville; Rose McAleese	September 25, 2020
3	"The Match"	Dave Meyers	Carl Tart; Kara Brown	September 25, 2020
4	"CSI: Sandwich"	Dave Meyers	Carl Tart; Inny Clemons	September 25, 2020
5	"Jason F**king Statham"	Dave Meyers	Jason Belleville	September 25, 2020
6	"Dick Pic"	Dave Meyers	Jay Longino	September 25, 2020

== Production ==
=== Development ===
On August 17, 2020, Netflix picked up Sneakerheads for a series consisting of 6 episodes. The series was created by Jay Longino, who also executive produced alongside Inny Clemons, Justin Killion, Will Gluck, Richard Schwartz, Kevin Mann, Brendan Bragg, Jason Belleville, Rod Grable, and Dave Meyers. The series premiered on September 25, 2020.

=== Casting ===
Upon the announcement that the series had been picked up, it was reported that Allen Maldonado, Andrew Bachelor, Jearnest Corchado, Matthew Josten, Yaani King, Justin Lee, and Aja Evans were cast in starring roles.

== Reception ==
For the series, review aggregator Rotten Tomatoes reported an approval rating of 57% based on 7 reviews, with an average rating of 5/10. Metacritic gave the series a weighted average score of 47 out of 100 based on 4 reviews, indicating "mixed or average reviews".
