= List of common television awards categories =

Several categories are commonly presented at various television awards ceremonies.

== Best Series ==
- AARP Movies for Grownups Award for Best TV Series
- MTV Movie & TV Award for Best Show
- TCA Award for Program of the Year

=== Best Comedy Series ===
- AACTA Award for Best Television Comedy Series
- British Academy Television Award for Best Scripted Comedy
- Canadian Screen Award for Best Comedy Series
- Critics' Choice Television Award for Best Comedy Series
- GLAAD Media Award for Outstanding Comedy Series
- Golden Globe Award for Best Television Series – Musical or Comedy
- International Emmy Award for Best Comedy Series
- NAACP Image Award for Outstanding Comedy Series
- Primetime Emmy Award for Outstanding Comedy Series
- Producers Guild of America Award for Best Episodic Comedy
- Satellite Award for Best Television Series – Musical or Comedy
- TCA Award for Outstanding Achievement in Comedy

=== Best Drama Series ===
- AACTA Award for Best Television Drama Series
- British Academy Television Award for Best Drama Series
- British Academy Television Award for Best Soap and Continuing Drama
- Canadian Screen Award for Best Dramatic Series
- Critics' Choice Television Award for Best Drama Series
- Daytime Emmy Award for Outstanding Drama Series
- GLAAD Media Award for Outstanding Drama Series
- Golden Globe Award for Best Television Series – Drama
- International Emmy Award for Best Drama Series
- NAACP Image Award for Outstanding Drama Series
- National Television Award for Outstanding Drama Series
- Primetime Emmy Award for Outstanding Drama Series
- Producers Guild of America Award for Best Episodic Drama
- Satellite Award for Best Television Series – Drama
- TCA Award for Outstanding Achievement in Drama

=== Best Miniseries / Limited Series / TV Movie ===
- AACTA Award for Best Miniseries or Telefeature
- AARP Movies for Grownups Award for Best TV Movie/Limited Series
- British Academy Television Award for Best Mini-Series
- Canadian Screen Award for Best TV Movie
- Critics' Choice Television Award for Best Movie/Miniseries
- GLAAD Media Award for Outstanding Limited or Anthology Series
- Golden Globe Award for Best Limited or Anthology Series or Television Film
- International Emmy Award for Best TV Movie or Miniseries
- NAACP Image Award for Outstanding Television Movie, Mini-Series or Dramatic Special
- Primetime Emmy Award for Outstanding Limited or Anthology Series
- Primetime Emmy Award for Outstanding Television Movie
- Producers Guild of America Award for Best Limited Series Television
- Producers Guild of America Award for Best Streamed or Televised Movie
- Satellite Award for Best Miniseries or Television Film
- TCA Award for Outstanding Achievement in Movies, Miniseries and Specials

=== Best Reality Series ===
- AACTA Award for Best Reality Television Series
- British Academy Television Award for Best Reality and Constructed Factual
- Critics' Choice Television Award for Best Reality Series
- Critics' Choice Television Award for Best Reality Series – Competition
- GLAAD Media Award for Outstanding Reality Program
- Primetime Emmy Award for Outstanding Reality Competition Program
- Primetime Emmy Award for Outstanding Structured Reality Program
- Primetime Emmy Award for Outstanding Unstructured Reality Program
- TCA Award for Outstanding Achievement in Reality Programming

=== Best Talk Series ===
- Critics' Choice Television Award for Best Talk Show
- NAACP Image Award for Outstanding Talk Series
- Primetime Emmy Award for Outstanding Talk Series

== Best Actor/Actress in a Series ==
=== Best Guest Actor/Actress in a Series ===
- Critics' Choice Television Award for Best Guest Performer in a Comedy Series
- Critics' Choice Television Award for Best Guest Performer in a Drama Series
- Primetime Emmy Award for Outstanding Guest Actor in a Comedy Series
- Primetime Emmy Award for Outstanding Guest Actress in a Comedy Series
- Primetime Emmy Award for Outstanding Guest Actor in a Drama Series
- Primetime Emmy Award for Outstanding Guest Actress in a Drama Series

== Best Ensemble in a Series ==
- Satellite Award for Best Cast – Television Series
- Screen Actors Guild Award for Outstanding Performance by an Ensemble in a Comedy Series
- Screen Actors Guild Award for Outstanding Performance by an Ensemble in a Drama Series

== Best Directing for a Series ==
- AACTA Award for Best Direction in Television

=== Best Directing for a Comedy Series ===
- Directors Guild of America Award for Outstanding Directing – Comedy Series
- Primetime Emmy Award for Outstanding Directing for a Comedy Series

=== Best Directing for a Drama Series ===
- Daytime Emmy Award for Outstanding Drama Series Directing Team
- Directors Guild of America Award for Outstanding Directing – Drama Series
- NAACP Image Award for Outstanding Directing in a Drama Series
- Primetime Emmy Award for Outstanding Directing for a Drama Series

== Best Writing for a Series ==
- AACTA Award for Best Screenplay in Television

=== Best Writing for a Comedy Series ===
- Primetime Emmy Award for Outstanding Writing for a Comedy Series
- Writers Guild of America Award for Television: Comedy Series
- Writers Guild of America Award for Television: Episodic Comedy

=== Best Writing for a Drama Series ===
- Daytime Emmy Award for Outstanding Drama Series Writing Team
- NAACP Image Award for Outstanding Writing in a Dramatic Series
- Primetime Emmy Award for Outstanding Writing for a Drama Series
- Writers Guild of America Award for Television: Dramatic Series
- Writers Guild of America Award for Television: Episodic Drama

== See also ==
- List of common film awards categories
