= Justin Lee (actor) =

American actor (born 1989)

- Born: September 26, 1989 (age 37); Mission Viejo, California, U.S.
- Occupation: Actor
- Years active: 2003-Present.

Justin Lee (born September 26, 1989) is an American actor known for his role as Annyong Bluth in the satirical sitcom series Arrested Development.

== Early life ==
Justin Lee, the middle child of three siblings, was born in Los Angeles, California, on September 30, 1989, of Korean descent. Lee attended Tesoro High School in Las Flores, California, and graduated from Sunny Hills High School in 2007.

== Career ==
Lee began his career in 2004 as Hel-loh "Annyong" Bluth, the adopted Korean son of Lucille and George Bluth in the Fox sitcom Arrested Development.

In 2007, Lee played the role of Todd in the Wendelin Van Draanen-based made-for-TV movie Shredderman Rules. Lee appeared in the independent film Just Peck, which premiered at the Cannes Film Festival in 2009. He also had a recurring role on the ABC Family television series 10 Things I Hate About You, portraying Charlie "The Perv" Woo.

== Filmography ==
=== Film ===
Year	Title	Role	Notes
2009	Just Peck	Jun	
2014	The Interview	Squad Leader	
2017	30-Love	Johnnie	
2021	Inside the Circle	Justin	Completed

=== Television ===
Year	Title	Role	Notes
2003, 2005	The Bernie Mac Show	Killa From Manila	2 episodes
2004–2013	Arrested Development	Annyong Bluth	12 episodes
2007	Shredderman Rules	Todd	Television film
2009–2010	10 Things I Hate About You	Charlie Woo	3 episodes
2011	Shameless	Warren	Episode: "Killer Carl"
2012–2013	One Warm Night	Jonathan	9 episodes
2017	Tales of Titans	Alt Trash	6 episodes
2017	Get Shorty	Henry Choi	2 episodes
2019	Sneaky Pete	Tuan	3 episodes
2019	Artificial Uncovered	Justin	14 episodes; Twitch TV series
2019–2020	Artificial	Justin	14 episodes; Twitch TV series
2020	Sneakerheads	Cole	4 episodes
