= Chuck Tatham =

Canadian screenwriter and television producer

- Born: Listowel, Ontario, Canada
- Occupations: Screenwriter, television producer
- Writing career
- Notable work: Arrested Development

Charles Tatham (born 1963) is a Canadian screenwriter and television producer best known for his work on Arrested Development, How I Met Your Mother, and Modern Family.

== Early life ==
Tatham was born in Listowel, Ontario. He grew up in Guelph and later lived in Waterloo, London, and Bathurst Street. He moved to Los Angeles in 1991 with his brother Jamie to pursue a career in writing in the film and television industry after working in the advertising business for five years in Toronto.

== Career ==
Tatham's first writing job was in 1992 on the sitcom Full House, for which he wrote eight episodes with his brother and writing partner, Jamie, who later quit and returned to Vancouver, while Chuck went on to become a producer in 1994. He then went on to a number of simultaneous writer-producer jobs on sitcoms including Suddenly Susan, Oh, Grow Up, Less Than Perfect, The Jake Effect and Andy Barker, P.I., the latter four of which he served as a co-executive producer. His most notable (and acclaimed) role, however, has been as a writer and co-executive producer for the comedy series Arrested Development from 2005 to 2006. He was nominated for two Emmys in 2006; the first shared with the show's other producers in the category of Outstanding Comedy Series, and the second shared with three other writers of the episode "Development Arrested" in the Outstanding Writing for a Comedy Series category. He has also, with the rest of the Arrested Development writing crew, been nominated for two Writers Guild of America Awards, in 2005 and 2006, both in the Comedy Series category. Following ‘Arrested Development’ Tatham wrote on ‘How I Met Your Mother’ for five seasons, then ‘Modern Family’ for three seasons.

He fully supported the 2007–2008 Writers Guild of America strike, then developed a project with Ron Howard a new series,The Church of Reggie, about a man who starts his own religion on his porch.

In 2020, he signed on as an executive producer on the forthcoming Canadian sitcom Children Ruin Everything.

== Personal life ==
He has two sons. He enjoys hockey and slow marathons and is allergic to bananas.
