= Robert Berlinger =

American television director and producer

- Born: Robert William Berlinger; May 31, 1958 (age 67); New York City, New York, U.S.
- Other names: Bob Berlinger
- Occupations: Television director and producer
- Years active: 1980–2012
- Spouse(s): Sharon Faye Bialy (1985–present; 2 children)

Robert Berlinger (sometimes credited as Bob Berlinger; born May 31, 1958) is an American television director and producer.

== Career ==
Berlinger was born in New York City. He received his Bachelor of Arts degree at Dartmouth College. He also graduated from the University of California San Diego after training in professional theatre directing.

During much of the 1980s, Berlinger directed a number of stage productions namely Desire Under the Elms (1980), The Voice of the Turtle (1985), On the Verge, or the Geography of Yearning (1986-1987) Orphans (1987), Timon of Athens (1988) and Another Antigone (1988-1989)

He made his television directorial debut with an episode of Working Girl starring Sandra Bullock. He was the primary director for the entire four season run of the Jamie Lee Curtis-Richard Lewis ABC comedy Anything But Love from 1989 to 1992. He also directed 13 episodes of NBC's Cafe Americain starring Valerie Bertinelli in the 1993-1994 television season. In 2007, Berlinger directed The Dukes of Hazzard prequel, The Dukes of Hazzard: The Beginning.

== Television credits ==
He has directed episodes of The King of Queens, The Bernie Mac Show, Cybill, Chicago Hope, The Agency, Ed, 3rd Rock from the Sun, Kath & Kim, Rude Awakening, Veronica's Closet, The West Wing, Time of Your Life, Cold Feet, Titus, Once and Again, Empty Nest, The Golden Girls, Deadline, Watching Ellie, Hidden Hills, Dharma & Greg, Weeds, Sports Night, Sydney, Gilmore Girls, Men in Trees, Pepper Dennis, Sons & Daughters, Two and a Half Men, Rodney, Still Standing, Hellcats, Wizards of Waverly Place, Fairly Legal, Up All Night and Arrested Development.
