= Richard Day (writer) =

American writer and film director

Richard Day is an American writer, producer, director and occasional actor. He has worked as a writer/producer for several television programs, including, Arrested Development, Spin City, Ellen, Roseanne, Mad About You and Aliens in America.

In addition to his work in television, he has also written and directed his own independent films Girls Will Be Girls and Straight-Jacket based on his own off-Broadway play.
