= Stuart Bass =

American film and television editor

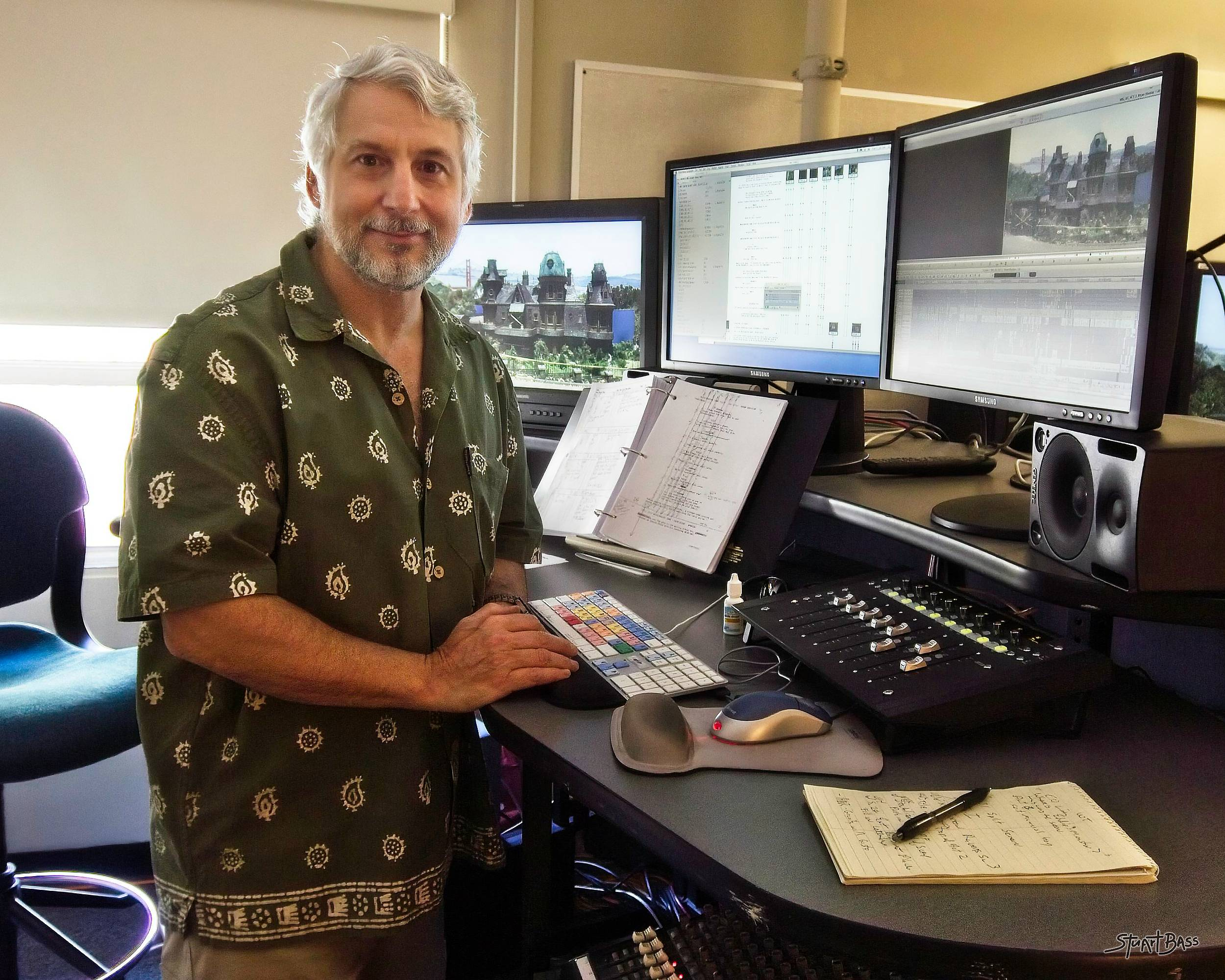
- Born: Montreal, Quebec, Canada
- Occupations: Editor; Director; Photographer
- Years active: 1985–present

Stuart Bass, ACE, is an American film and television editor and director. He is best known for his work on the television series The Wonder Years, MacGyver, The Office, Arrested Development, Pushing Daisies, and A Series of Unfortunate Events.

== Life and career ==
Bass was born in Montreal, Canada. He received his B.A. from the University of Wisconsin at Madison in 1978 in Communication Arts and a M.F.A. from the San Francisco Art Institute in 1980. In 2009, The Motion Picture Editors Guild Magazine stated that "Stuart Bass Brings a Cinematic Sensibility to Cutting Comedy". He is a member of American Cinema Editors. He was a governor of the Academy of Television Arts and Sciences from 2007 to 2010 and from 2012 to 2017. He retired as an editor/director in 2019 and is pursuing fine art photography.

== Awards and nominations ==
Year	Result	Award	Category	Work	Ref.
2009	Nominated	Primetime Emmy Awards	Outstanding Single-Camera Picture Editing for a Comedy Series	The Office	
2008	Won	Primetime Emmy Awards	Outstanding Single-Camera Picture Editing for a Comedy Series	Pushing Daisies: Pie-lette	
2008	Won	Hollywood Professional Association	Outstanding Editing - Television	Pushing Daisies: Pie-lette	
2006	Nominated	Hollywood Professional Association	Outstanding Editing - Television	Arrested Development	
2006	Nominated	Primetime Emmy Awards	Outstanding Single-Camera Picture Editing for a Comedy Series	Arrested Development	
2005	Won	American Cinema Editors	Best Edited Comedy Series for Non-Commercial Television	Arrested Development	
1997	Nominated	American Cinema Editors	Best Edited Comedy Series for Non-Commercial Television	Sabrina the Teenage Witch	
1994	Nominated	Primetime Emmy Awards	Outstanding Individual Achievement - Informational Programming	But... Seriously	
1989	Nominated	Primetime Emmy Awards	Best Edited Half-Hour Series for Television	Sabrina the Teenage Witch: The Crucible	
