= W/ Bob & David =

American sketch comedy television series

- Title card for the show
- Genre: Sketch comedy
- Created by: Bob Odenkirk; David Cross
- Written by: Bob Odenkirk; David Cross
- Directed by: Keith Truesdell; Jason Woliner
- Starring: Bob Odenkirk; David Cross
- Theme music composer: Cyriak
- No. of seasons: 1
- No. of episodes: 4 (and 1 special)

Production
- Executive producers: Bob Odenkirk; David Cross; Naomi Odenkirk; Tim Sarkes; Dave Kneebone; Tim Heidecker; Eric Wareheim
- Running time: 27–33 minutes
- Production companies: Odenkirk Provissiero Entertainment; Brillstein Entertainment Partners; Abso Lutely Productions

Original release
- Network: Netflix
- Release: November 13, 2015

W/ Bob & David is an American sketch comedy television series created by and starring Bob Odenkirk and David Cross that premiered on Netflix on November 13, 2015. The sketch show consists of four half-hour episodes plus an hour-long making-of special entitled "Behind the Making of the Scenes". It is an homage to the 1995–1998 HBO sketch comedy series Mr. Show with Bob and David, which also starred Odenkirk and Cross. W/ Bob & David shares many of the same supporting cast members and writing team of the earlier series, and its title is also a variation of that of Mr. Show. Odenkirk described W/ Bob & David as "lighter", "less complex" and "faster" than Mr. Show.

== Production ==
Shooting began on April 15, 2015. W/ Bob & David is written and executive produced by Odenkirk and Cross. Marc Provissiero and Naomi Odenkirk, Tim Sarkes, Dave Kneebone, Tim Heidecker, and Eric Wareheim also produce. The four episodes, which were released simultaneously on November 13, 2015, had the studio segments directed by Keith Truesdell and the pre-recorded segments directed by Jason Woliner, except for the fourth episode, in which Tom Gianas also directed the pre-recorded segments. The hour-long making of special was directed by Lance Bangs.

The opening title sequence was created by digital artist and musician Cyriak Harris. Bob & David contacted Cyriak to create the opening sequence with a hands-off approach, only asking him to not make it specifically like standard TV credits but more like his viral YouTube videos. His signature style of beat sequenced animations to original music compositions featuring morphing branches of elements from still photos and videos created in Adobe After Effects. is greatly inspired by, and has been compared to Terry Gilliam's animated sequences used in the British sketch comedy show, Monty Python's Flying Circus, a significant inspiration for the show's creators and its featured crossing of sketches with transitional videos and animated elements.

== Episodes ==
No.	Title	Original release date
1	"Episode 1"	November 13, 2015
A sketch comedy series written by and starring Bob Odenkirk and David Cross. In the series opener, the guys are dishonorably discharged from the Navy SEALs.
2	"Episode 2"	November 13, 2015
Bob and David disagree with Standards and Practices; cops get sensitive with a witness; and a man is inspired to create a musical at the dry cleaners.
3	"Episode 3"	November 13, 2015
Digital is the new gospel; an anti-police operation goes wrong; and a skier turns into a major cultural figure. Note: This episode was removed from Netflix in 2020, due to a segment in which Cross wears blackface.
4	"Episode 4"	November 13, 2015
Mothers are spotlighted; a boy has a controversial journey to Heaven; salesmen tell their stories; and Bob sneaks in a skit, much to David's dismay
5	"Episode 5"	November 13, 2015
Go behind the scenes in this hour-long special where Bob and David reveal what it takes to put on a sketch show in their own special way.

== Cast ==
- Bob Odenkirk
- David Cross
- John Ennis
- Jay Johnston
- Tom Kenny
- Brett Paesel
- Brian Posehn
- Jill Talley
- Paul F. Tompkins
- Mark Rivers
- Scott Aukerman
- Eric Von Hoffman
- Mary Lynn Rajskub
- Dino Stamatopoulos
- Becky Thyre
- Scott Adsit
- Dave Allen
- Stephanie Courtney
- Paget Brewster
- Mike Mitchell
- Keegan-Michael Key
- Jeffrey Tambor
- Joe Frank

== Reception ==
W/ Bob & David received positive reviews from critics. On the review aggregator website Rotten Tomatoes, the series holds an approval rating of 89%, based on 27 reviews, with an average rating of 7.64/10. The site's critical consensus reads, "W/ Bob & David offers a long-overdue reunion between Mr. Show principals Odenkirk and Cross – and a suitably hilarious reminder of the reasons for their subsequent individual successes." On Metacritic, the series has a score of 76 out of 100, based on 20 critics, indicating "generally favorable reviews".

In June 2020, Netflix removed the third episode of the show, due to a segment in which Cross's character wears blackface. Both he and Odenkirk objected to the decision, with Cross saying the scene was meant to satirize the character's "ridiculous foolish[ness]".

== Future ==
In an August 2016 interview with The A.V. Club, Cross stated "We will absolutely do some more of that at some point. It's really tough. Bob and I really want to do it, Netflix would like us to do it again, everybody's on board. It's just a matter of scheduling, and Bob's got a very strict, specific schedule with Better Call Saul."

In an August 2022 interview on the podcast Comedy Bang! Bang!, Odenkirk stated that it was unlikely there would be another season of the show, citing the age of the cast.
