= 12 Deadly Days =

- Genre: Horror; Comedy; Anthology
- Created by: Chris Cullari; Jennifer Raite
- Starring: Jon Fletcher; Betty Gabriel; John Kassir; J. Claude Deering
- Country of origin: United States
- Original language: English
- No. of episodes: 12

Production
- Producers: Jason Blum; Joe Lynch; Troy Miller; Chris Cullari; Jennifer Raite; Buddy Enright; Patrick Casey; Josh Miller
- Cinematography: Scott Winig
- Editors: John Quinn; Andrew Vona; Zachary Weintraub; Marshall Harvey
- Running time: 27 minutes
- Production companies: Blumhouse Television; Dakota Pictures

Original release
- Release: December 12 – December 22, 2016

12 Deadly Days is a 2016 American comedy horror anthology series produced exclusively for YouTube Red, it was created by Chris Cullari and Jennifer Raite and starred Anna Akana, Jon Fletcher, J. Claude Deering, and Kaitlin Doubleday and other Internet personalities. The series premiered on December 12, 2016. The season finale was released on December 22, 2016. The 12 episodes series is produced by Blumhouse Television and Dakota Pictures.

The series is set in the cursed town of Saturn, California, during the 12 days leading up to Christmas. Filmed in Pomona, CA.

== Episodes ==
=== Season 1 ===
No.	Title	Release date
1	A Haunting at the End of the Street	December 12, 2016
2	Killer Firs	December 12, 2016
3	Love Bites	December 13, 2016
4	Reindeer Games	December 14, 2016
5	Coffee Cups	December 15, 2016
6	Singers Slaying	December 16, 2016
7	Nuts A' Cracking	December 17, 2016
8	Elves Ascending	December 18, 2016
9	Cakes A' Cursing	December 19, 2016
10	Cameras Rolling	December 20, 2016
11	Phantoms Frightening	December 21, 2016
12	Worlds Ending	December 22, 2016
