= Forever (2018 TV series) =

2018 American TV series

- Genre: Comedy drama
- Created by: Alan Yang; Matt Hubbard
- Starring: Fred Armisen; Maya Rudolph
- Composer: Daniel Hart
- Country of origin: United States
- Original language: English
- No. of seasons: 1
- No. of episodes: 8

Production
- Executive producers: Alan Yang; Matt Hubbard; Maya Rudolph; Fred Armisen; Dave Becky; Tim Sarkes
- Producer: Ted Gidlow
- Cinematography: Mark Schwartzbard
- Editors: Daniel Haworth; Dan Schalk
- Camera setup: Single-camera
- Running time: 25–35 minutes
- Production companies: Alan Yang Pictures; Normal Sauce; 3 Arts Entertainment; Brillstein Entertainment Partners; Universal Television; Amazon Studios

Original release
- Network: Amazon Prime Video
- Release: September 14, 2018

Forever is an American comedy-drama television series created by Alan Yang and Matt Hubbard that premiered on September 14, 2018, on Amazon Prime Video. It stars Fred Armisen and Maya Rudolph, both of whom also executive produced, alongside Yang, Hubbard, Dave Becky, and Tim Sarkes. On July 27, 2019, the series was cancelled after one season.

== Premise ==
Forever follows married couple Oscar and June who live a comfortable but predictable life in suburban Riverside, California. For 12 years they've had the same conversations, eaten the same meals and taken pleasant vacations at the same lake house. After June talks Oscar into shaking things up with a ski trip, the pair find themselves in unfamiliar territory.

== Cast and characters ==
=== Main ===
- Fred Armisen as Oscar Hoffman, a dentist and June's husband. Content with living with an average and uneventful existence, he does not realize how restless his wife has become in their humdrum life.
- Maya Rudolph as June Hoffman, an employee of a timeshare company and Oscar's wife.

=== Recurring ===
- Catherine Keener as Kase, a former government employee who moves to Riverside after being hit by a truck. Severely dissatisfied with her previous life, she sees the afterlife as a potential new start.
- Noah Robbins as Mark Erickson, a teenage boy who died in a car accident in the 1970s and lives in Riverside. He befriends Oscar and helps him navigate the afterlife.
- Sharon Omi as Mrs. Nakajima, an elderly woman who lives in Riverside and attempts to comfort Oscar after June leaves him.
- Kym Whitley as Sharon, a friend of June's who attempts to help her move on after Oscar's death.
- Charles Emmett as Jim, a man who lives in Riverside who is constantly seen mowing his lawn.
- Cooper Friedman as Josiah, a young boy who lives in Riverside and who apparently has been dead the longest and knows the most about the afterlife.
- Peter Weller as The Traveler, a mysterious man who leads others to Oceanside and prevents others from leaving.
- Julia Ormond as Marisol, a woman who lives in Oceanside.
- Obba Babatundé as Gregory, a man who lives in Oceanside.

=== Guest ===
- Amir M. Korangy as Dr. Mohammed ("Together Forever"), a fellow dentist who works with Oscar.
- Patricia Belcher as Ellen ("June"), an employee at the timeshare company who offers June the position she wants in Hawaii.
- Rheagan Wallace as Isabella ("June"), a clothing store employee who assists June in buying a new wardrobe for her move to Hawaii.
- Elizabeth Ho as Melanie Park ("The Lake House"), a woman who buys the lake house Oscar and June go to every year.
- Nancy Lenehan as Heather Jacoby ("Another Place"), a woman whom Mark knew in high school who died many years later. He endeavors to start a relationship with her until she reveals that she is waiting for the arrival of her husband of forty years.
- Hong Chau as Sarah ("Andre and Sarah"), a real estate agent, attempting to sell a house near Riverside, engaged in an ongoing affair.
- Jason Mitchell as Andre ("Andre and Sarah"), a real estate agent, attempting to sell a house near Riverside, engaged in an ongoing affair.
- Jesse D. Goins as 60 Year Old Andre ("Andre and Sarah"), an older Andre who goes back to the house that he and Sarah attempted to sell over the years to see her again. He is distraught when informed that she has recently died.

== Episodes ==
No.	Title	Directed by	Written by	Original release date
1	"Together Forever"	Alan Yang	Alan Yang & Matt Hubbard	September 14, 2018
Oscar and June meet each other for the first time at a bar. After dating, they fall in love and get married. Although their life together seems great, they quickly find themselves falling into a routine, as they eat the same things every week and take the same vacation to their lake house every year. Although June is clearly restless, Oscar appears satisfied with their life together. When June recommends shaking things up by going skiing instead of taking their typical lake house vacation, Oscar is reluctant, but he agrees to go along. The trip is more difficult than June imagined, as they have difficulty renting skis and scheduling a skiing lesson. Although Oscar encourages June to take one last trip down the mountain, she elects to spend the rest of the trip at the lodge. While June sits at the bar, Oscar skis down the mountain, where he crashes into a tree and is killed.
2	"June"	Alan Yang	Story by : Matt Murray; Teleplay by : Alan Yang & Matt Hubbard	September 14, 2018
A year after Oscar was killed on their skiing trip, June is still depressed and blaming herself for her husband's death. Her friend Sharon attempts to cheer her up, encouraging her to start over. After Sharon drags her to church, June is still depressed, telling Sharon that life is pointless and that there is no God. When June attempts to apologize to her friend for the outburst, Sharon encourages her to find a new job, as this might help her move on. June decides to apply for a new posting that would send her to Hawaii, but when she gets to the interview, she becomes intimidated and backs out; however, the next day, June's company experiences mass layoffs, as many people were discovered embezzling funds. June is offered the job in Hawaii thanks to the shake-up at the company, and she decides to take it. While sitting in first class, June chokes on a macadamia nut and passes out. She awakens to the face of her husband, who welcomes her to the afterlife.
3	"The Lake House"	Janicza Bravo	Story by : Joe Mande; Teleplay by : Alan Yang & Matt Hubbard	September 14, 2018
Oscar greets June in the afterlife, a small community known as Riverside. Oscar is excited to see her and continue their life together, as he had been awaiting her arrival. Oscar explains that people in the afterlife are "Formers", able to see the living, referred to as "Currents", who cannot see Formers. There is a fountain in the center of Riverside; the further away from the fountain that a Former moves, the weaker they feel, which prevents them from leaving. Oscar reveals that their lake house is present in Riverside, but when they go there, it is occupied by a family of Currents. Oscar enlists Mark, a teenaged Former, to haunt the family into leaving. Mark teaches them how to affect the real world by channeling their anger into the tips of their fingers, but only June is successful. The family is not sufficiently spooked, and June tells Oscar that she wants to give up the lake house, feeling it a symbol of the bad routine they had fallen into before their deaths.
4	"Kase"	Janicza Bravo	Story by : Jen Statsky; Teleplay by : Alan Yang & Matt Hubbard	September 14, 2018
Oscar and June start to fall back into the routines that they had been in before their deaths. Once again, June begins to feel restless, while Oscar seems content with their new life. One day, Mark comes to them to tell them about a new person showing up in the neighborhood. Oscar and June try to welcome their new neighbor, Kase, but she is resistant to their friendly overtures. They continue their attempts to make friends with Kase, but she continues to shut them out, while making mysterious sounds within her house. Eventually, June decides to break into Kase's house to see what she is doing. Kase confronts her for this intrusion and invites her over. Kase shows June that she has been repeatedly trying to destroy a piece of furniture in her house, which keeps miraculously rebuilding itself. Kase invites June to help her burn the furniture, in one last attempt, but this too fails. Clearly changed by the encounter, June returns to her own house and tries to burn a chair in the yard. Oscar watches from inside, clearly concerned for his wife.
5	"Another Place"	Miguel Arteta	Story by : Aniz Adam Ansari; Teleplay by : Alan Yang & Matt Hubbard	September 14, 2018
June becomes bored of their routine. After a fight over the correct way to load the dishwasher, she leaves the house and runs into Kase, who invites her to take a walk outside of Riverside. They weaken as they get further from the fountain, so Kase leads them to a convenience store, where she places her hands on the cashier. To June's amazement, the man begins to feel tired, and Kase is rejuvenated, after which June does the same thing. Walking back towards Riverside, they encounter a mysterious man who invites them to Oceanside. Although Kase wants to go, June doesn't want to abandon Oscar, so they both return to Riverside. Oscar helps Mark ask out Heather, a woman that he had a crush on when he was alive. While the date goes well, Heather explains that she is waiting for her husband to join her. When Oscar and June meet up, June voices her fears that their routine will never change, while Oscar explains that he enjoys the routine. Their angry disagreement remains unresolved.
6	"Andre and Sarah"	Alan Yang	Alan Yang & Colleen McGuinness	September 14, 2018
Junior realtor Andre visits an open house for a client. He meets junior realtor Sarah, who is trying to sell the house. With no one coming to see the house, they grow closer over a bottle of wine. They kiss, but Sarah backs off, as she is recently engaged. Andre leaves, while a disappointed Sarah watches. Years later, Sarah attends an open house being held by Andre. They have both gotten married, have advanced in their careers, but once again bond over a bottle of wine at the sparsely attended event. Sarah admits that she came to see him, and they sleep together in the house. The two continue their affair, using an unpurchased house to simulate a life together. They agree to tell their spouses so they can be together. Years later, Andre attends an open house run by Sarah's company, where he learns that Sarah recently died of cancer. As Andre talks to himself about missing their chance, he is watched by June. Affected by Andre's regret, she returns to Kase's and tells her that she is ready to travel to Oceanside.
7	"Oceanside"	Miguel Arteta	Story by : Ali Gusberg; Teleplay by : Alan Yang & Matt Hubbard	September 14, 2018
Oscar wakes up to find a letter from June, telling him that she is leaving him to explore the afterlife with Kase. Oscar meets with Mark, who introduces him to Josiah, a young boy. Josiah tells them about Oceanside, and Oscar resolves to go there to find June. June and Kase arrive at Oceanside to discover a community of Formers partying in a mansion overlooking the ocean. The apparent leaders, Marisol and Gregory, explain that the community has chosen to enjoy the benefits of being dead. The Formers at Oceanside pursue feats like walking on the ocean floor or letting cars drive through their incorporeal forms. Oscar suddenly arrives and yells at June, furious she has abandoned him. He suddenly collapses, weak from being away from the fountain, and having refused to absorb energy from Currents.
8	"Goodbye Forever"	Alan Yang	Alan Yang & Matt Hubbard	September 14, 2018
Oscar awakens on the beach, but he is still furious with June. He asks for a divorce, and although June tries to point out the absurdity of this due to their deaths, Oscar is determined. After declaring themselves divorced, they go their separate ways, with Oscar deciding to return to Riverside. However, Oscar finds his path back blocked by the mysterious stranger that had invited Kase and June to Oceanside. He declares that all roads lead to Oceanside and prevents him from leaving. June is moved by Oscar's determination to build a boat to escape Oceanside, and subsequent conversations lead to a rekindling of their original affection for each other. They know they cannot return to Riverside, and the shallow excess of Oceanside holds no appeal. June asks Oscar, "Do you trust me?," and they walk into the ocean and along its floor, emerging into another land to begin anew.

== Production ==
Promotional poster.

=== Development ===
On September 8, 2017, it was announced that Amazon had given the production a straight-to-series order consisting of one season. The series was created by Alan Yang and Matt Hubbard who are set to executive produce the series alongside Fred Armisen, Maya Rudolph, Dave Becky, and Tim Sarkes. Production companies expected to be involved with the series included Universal Television. On December 21, 2017, it was reported that the series was expected to debut in 2018. On August 2, 2018, it was announced that the series would premiere on September 14, 2018.

=== Casting ===
Alongside the initial series announcement, it was reported that Armisen and Rudolph were cast in the series' lead roles. On December 1, 2017, it was announced that Catherine Keener had joined the series in a recurring role.

== Release ==
On August 2, 2018, the first trailer and poster for the series were released.

== Reception ==
=== Critical response ===
The series has been met with a positive response from critics upon its premiere. On the review aggregation website Rotten Tomatoes, the first season holds a 95% approval rating, with an average rating of 7.60 out of 10 based on 37 reviews. The website's critical consensus reads, "Forever is a gently harrowing and mirthful dive into the ennui of matrimony, elevated by Maya Rudolph's dazzling turn of not-so-quiet desperation." Metacritic, which uses a weighted average, assigned the season a score of 77 out of 100 based on 20 critics, indicating "generally favorable reviews".

=== Awards and nominations ===
Year	Award	Category	Nominee(s)	Result	Ref.
2019	Writers Guild of America Awards	Television: Episodic Comedy	Aniz Adam Ansari, Alan Yang, & Matt Hubbard (for "Another Place")	Nominated	
