= Dinner with Raphael =

- Theatrical release Poster
- Directed by: Joey Boukadakis
- Written by: Joey Boukadakis
- Produced by: Mary Pat Bentel; Joey Boukadakis; Josh McGuire
- Starring: Dianna Agron; Paul Boukadakis; Michael Ray Bower; Brett Paesel; Richard Riehle
- Cinematography: James Codeglia
- Edited by: David Codeglia
- Distributed by: Ghostlight Productions
- Release date: January 1, 2009
- Running time: 10 minutes
- Country: United States
- Language: English

Dinner with Raphael is a 2009 American short comedy film produced and directed by Joey Boukadakis. It stars Dianna Agron, Paul Boukadakis, Michael Bower, Brett Paesel and Richard Riehle.

The film was co-produced by Mary Pat Bentel and Josh McGuire.

== Cast ==
- Dianna Agron as Dianna
- Paul Boukadakis as Paul Siegfried
- Michael Bower as Raphael/Jimmy Siegfried
- Brett Paesel as Mrs. Siegfried
- Richard Riehle as Mr. Siegfried
- Joey Boukadakis as Wedding Guest
