= Dakota Pictures =

American film and television production company)

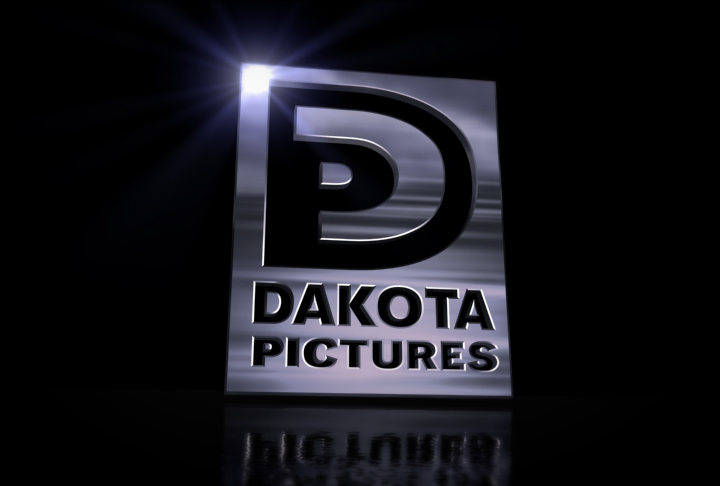
- Type: Private
- Founded: 1985 (as Dakota North Entertainment); 2004 (as Dakota Pictures)
- Founder: Troy Miller
- Headquarters: North Hollywood, California, U.S.
- Website: www.dakotafilms.com

Dakota Pictures is an American film/television production company and development company created by Director/Writer/Producer Troy Miller in 1985. Early on, Miller established Dakota as a creative destination for talented writers, directors and producers. It originally known as Dakota North Entertainment until 2004, when it changed to Dakota Pictures. Dakota actively produces scripted and reality-based series and specials, with of a strong history of being a destination for alternative comedy and mainstream entertainment.

Dakota Pictures has produced many hit comedy series including Bored to Death. Flight of the Conchords, Tenacious D, and Mr. Show for HBO, Viva La Bam for MTV, and Behind The Lines for ABC. Dakota has received over a dozen Emmy nominations for various projects.

Years ago, Dakota Pictures began collaborating with Comedy Central to produce stand-up comedy specials for the likes of Brian Regan, Martin Short, David Alan Grier, John Oliver, and Jim Gaffigan. The two companies also worked together on behind the scenes specials of blockbuster comedy films such as, Old School, 40 Year Old Virgin. The Life Aquatic with Steve Zissou, Borat, Knocked Up, and I Love You, Man.

== Past productions ==
- The Sunday Comics (1991–1992)
- Mr. Show (1995–1998)
- Run Ronnie Run (2002)
- David Blaine: Vertigo (2002)
- Viva La Bam (2003–2005)
- The Life Aquatic with Steve Zissou (2004)
- 20: Entertainment Weekly's Scariest Movies (2004)
- The Entertainment Weekly Guide: Guilty Pleasures (2005)
- Celebrity Autobiography: In Their Own Words (2005)
- Van Stone: Tour of Duty (2006)
- Wyclef Jean in America (2006)
- Just For Laughs (2006)
- Behind The Lines (2007)
- Brian Regan: Standing Up (2007)
- The Bobby Lee Project (2008)
- Wait, Wait... Don't Tell Me! (2008)
- Sunday! Sunday! Sunday! (2008)
- John Oliver: Terrifying Times (2008)
- Brian Regan: The Epitome of Hyperbole (2008)
- Jo Koy: Don't Make Him Angry (2009)
- Flight of the Conchords (2007–2009)
- Martin Short: Let Freedom Hum (2009)
- David Alan Grier: Comedy You Can Believe You (2009)
- Bored to Death (2009–2011)
- Eagleheart (2011–2014)
- Brand X with Russell Brand (2012–2013)
- Deadbeat (2014)
- 12 Deadly Days (2016)
