= Run Ronnie Run! =

2002 American comedy film

- Theatrical release poster
- Directed by: Troy Miller
- Written by: David Cross; Bob Odenkirk; Scott Aukerman; B. J. Porter; Brian Posehn
- Produced by: Troy Miller; Mark Burg; Oren Koules
- Starring: David Cross; Bob Odenkirk; Nikki Cox
- Cinematography: Shawn Maurer
- Edited by: Dean Holland
- Music by: Scott Aukerman; Eban Schletter
- Production companies: Burg/Koules Productions; Dakota Pictures; HBO Original Programming
- Distributed by: New Line Home Video
- Release dates: January 20, 2002 (Sundance Film Festival); September 16, 2003
- Running time: 86 minutes
- Country: United States
- Language: English

Run Ronnie Run! is a 2002 American satirical comedy film directed by Troy Miller. The film is a spin-off inspired by David Cross's recurring character Ronnie Dobbs from the HBO sketch comedy series Mr. Show. David Cross plays the lead and multiple other roles, while Mr. Show co-creator Bob Odenkirk plays multiple supporting roles. The film was produced in 2001 and premiered at the 2002 Sundance Film Festival, before being released direct-to-video over 18 months later in 2003.

== Plot ==
Ronnie Dobbs—a redneck petty criminal whose hijinks are caught on tape by a Cops-like television show called Fuzz—is noticed by failing infomercial personality/inventor Terry Twillstein, who notices Dobbs' popularity with lowbrow viewers. He promotes the idea for a Ronnie Dobbs show to television executives entitled "Ronnie Dobbs Gets Arrested" in which Ronnie is arrested in a different city each week. The show becomes a phenomenal success leading to a level of fame and fortune that dramatically changes Dobbs' life.

== Cast ==
- David Cross as Ronwell Quincy "Ronnie" Dobbs / Pootie T / voice of Chow Chow
- Bob Odenkirk as Terry Twillstein / Wolfgang Amadeus Thelonious Von Funkenmeister the XIX ¾ / Daffy Mal Yinkle Yankle
- Nikki Cox as Kayla
- R. Lee Ermey as Lead Kidnapper
- M. C. Gainey as Hark Trellis
- David Koechner as Clay
- Jill Talley as Tammy
- E. J. De la Pena as Jerry Trellis
- Tom Kenny as TV News Reporter / Cult Leader Gleh’n
- Suli McCulloch as Kyle
- Becky Thyre as Tonya

Many of the regular cast members of Mr. Show made appearances in the film, including Paul F. Tompkins as Safari Guy in TV, Brett Paesel as Infomercial Nancy, Brian Posehn as Tank, Patton Oswalt as Dozer, Sarah Silverman as a Network Executive, Jack Black as Lead Chimney Sweep, Mary Lynn Rajskub as herself, John Ennis as Bartender, Scott Adsit as a Police Negotiator, and Scott Aukerman as a Starving Kidnapper.

In addition to members of Mr. Show, other notable appearances include Dave Foley and Andy Richter as Network Executives, Jeff Garlin as Birthday Woman's Friend, Laura Kightlinger as Birthday Woman, Patrick Warburton as Head of Gay Conspiracy, Doug Benson as Editor #3, David Baddiel and Morwenna Banks as British Couple, and Rhoda Griffis as TV Anchorwoman.

Many well-known celebrities had brief cameos in the film, such as Trey Parker, Matt Stone, Ben Stiller, John Stamos, Rebecca Romijn, Garry Shandling, Scott Ian, Kathy Griffin, Scott Thompson, Mandy Patinkin, and Jeff Goldblum.

== Production ==
The film premiered at the 2002 Sundance Film Festival. Bob Odenkirk initially publicly criticized the film's studio (New Line Cinema) and even went as far as releasing the personal email addresses of Robert Shaye (Chairman) and other principals of New Line Cinema to his fans in an effort to get the film released. He later went on to blame the film's failure on director Troy Miller who, as Odenkirk claims, denied him and David Cross the right to do a final edit of the film. Cross and Miller would later reunite when Miller was hired to direct several episodes of Arrested Development.

== Reception ==
On Rotten Tomatoes, the film has an approval rating of 71% based on 7 reviews, with an average rating of 6.4/10. Variety said the film failed "to sustain its initial burst of comic inspiration over the course of its feature-length running time."
