= Tim Sarkes =

American film producer

Tim Sarkes is a film and television producer who is known for his production on Run Ronnie Run!, as well as for Mind of Mencia.

== Production ==
- Mr. Show with Bob and David: Fantastic Newness (1996) (co-producer)
- Mr. Show with Bob and David (co-producer) (10 episodes, 1995–1996)
- Mr. Show and the Incredible, Fantastical News Report (1998) (co-executive producer)
- David Cross: The Pride Is Back (1999) (executive producer)
- Run Ronnie Run! (2002) (executive producer)
- Derek & Simon: A Bee and a Cigarette (2006) (executive producer)
- The Pity Card (2006) (executive producer)
- Steven Wright: When the Leaves Blow Away (2006) (executive producer)

== Actor ==
- Loomis (2001)
