= Michael Ray Bower =

American actor

- Born: Anthony Michael Ray Bower
- Other name: Michael Bower
- Occupation: Actor
- Years active: 1988–present

Michael Bower is an American actor best known for his role as Eddie "Donkeylips" Gelfen on the television program Salute Your Shorts, which aired from 1991 to 1992 on Nickelodeon and for which he won a Young Artist Award.

== Career ==
Born in Tarzana, California, Bower made his film debut in Michael Jackson's 1988 Moonwalker. He had appearances in episodic television series such as Webster, Tales from the Crypt, Empty Nest, Superior Court, Hull High, The Wonder Years, and Doogie Howser, M.D., before being brought into Salute Your Shorts for 20 episodes as the major character Eddie 'Donkeylips' Gelfen. After that series, he continued with guest roles on well-known television series, including that of Monica Geller's (Courteney Cox) prom date on an episode of Friends. He has also appeared in movies such as Marilyn Hotchkiss' Ballroom Dancing and Charm School and Ivan Reitman's Evolution. Bower had a small role in an episode of the FOX series Dark Angel, and played in the indie film Social Misfits, and the comedy short film Dinner with Raphael (written and directed by Joey Boukadakis).

Bower appeared as a contestant on the game show Fun House in the late 1980s as well as Nick Arcade in the early 1990s. He also appears in the music video for "Download This Song" by MC Lars. He has also appeared as a contestant on Singled Out and had a guest role on The Wonder Years as Peter Armbruster in 3 episodes in the early 1990s. He provides the voice of "Eugene Reaper" in Grand Theft Auto IV.

Bower can also be seen on commercials for Mountain Dew's Amp Energy Drinks as a high-voltage, dancing mechanic.

== Awards ==
- 1992 - Young Artist Award winner - Best Young Actor in a Cable Series - Salute Your Shorts

== Selected filmography ==
=== Television ===
- Webster (1 episode, 1988) as Mayor
- Mike Hammer: Murder Takes All (1989) as Velda's Nephew
- Tales from the Crypt (1 episode, 1989) as Junior
- Empty Nest (2 episodes, 1989–1990) as Josh
- Superior Court (1 episode, 1990) as Joey
- Hull High (1 episode, 1990) as Big Boy
- The Wonder Years, (3 episodes, 1990–1991) as Peter Armbruster, Kid, Joe
- Doogie Howser, M.D., (2 episodes, 1990–1991) as Boy Nerd, Josh
- Salute Your Shorts, (26 episodes, 1991–1992) as Eddie 'Donkeylips' Gelfen
- Running the Halls (1 episode, 1993) as Super George
- The Day My Parents Ran Away (1993) as Richie
- Weird Science (1 episode, 1994) as Kyle
- California Dreams, TV (2 episodes, 1992–1994) as Tommy
- Tattooed Teenage Alien Fighters from Beverly Hills (1 episode, 1995) as Alex
- Friends (1 episode, 1996) as Roy Gublik
- Rescue 77 (1 episode, 1999) as Party Guy
- Chicken Soup for the Soul (1 episode, 2000) as Henry
- The X-Files (First Person Shooter, 2000)
- Dark Angel (Brainiac, 2002)
- Monk (1 episode, 2006) as Peter
- CSI: Crime Scene Investigation (Living Doll, 2007)
- Bones (The Finder, 2011) as Sam Nozik
- Raising Hope (1 episode, 2014) as Kevin

=== Film ===
- Moonwalker (1988) (scenes deleted)
- She's Out of Control (1989) as Kid at Beach
- Marilyn Hotchkiss' Ballroom Dancing and Charm School (1990) as Glen Tanksley
- The Willies (1990) as Gordy Belcher
- Captain Nuke and the Bomber Boys (1995) as Frank Pescoe
- High School High (1996) as Heckler (Uncredited)
- Dude, Where's My Car? (2000) as Big Cult Guard
- Social Misfits (2001) as Edgar
- Evolution (2001) as Danny Donald
- Wishcraft (2002) as Tony
- Sex and the Teenage Mind (2002) as Dwayne
- Marilyn Hotchkiss' Ballroom Dancing and Charm School (2005) as Tommy Tanksley
- Dinner with Raphael (2009) as Raphael, Jimmy
- Perfect Combination (2010) as Tony
- Dumbbells (2014) as Erwin
- Cocked (2015) as Technician
- The Bread of Wickedness (2018)

=== Video games ===
- Grand Theft Auto: Vice City Stories (2006) as Commercial Voice, People of Vice City
- Bully (2006) as Mr. Buckingham
- Grand Theft Auto IV (2008) as Eugene Reaper, The Crowd of Liberty City, Commercial
- Grand Theft Auto: The Ballad of Gay Tony (2009) as Eugene Reaper (Archive Footage)
- Halo 3: ODST (2009) as Additional Voices
- Red Dead Redemption (2010) as The Local Population
- Star Wars: The Old Republic (2011) as Additional Voices (Uncredited)
