= Brian Peck =

American sex offender and dialogue coach (born 1960)

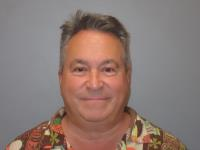
- Born: Brian Richard Peck; July 29, 1960 (age 66); Huntington, Indiana, U.S.
- Occupations: Actor; dialogue coach; producer; filmmaker
- Years active: 1982–2019
- Known for: The Return of the Living Dead
- Height: 5 ft 7 in (1.70 m)
- Status: Released and registered as a sex offender (2005)
- Convictions: Convicted on 2 counts: a lewd act upon a child 14 or 15 by a person 10 years or older; oral copulation of a person under 16
- Penalty: 16 months in prison

Details
- Victims: Drake Bell
- Date apprehended: August 19, 2003

Brian Richard Peck (Note: Brian Peck is of no relation to Josh Peck, Drake Bell's co-star on Drake & Josh.) (born July 29, 1960) is an American convicted sex offender and former dialogue coach and actor. From the late 1990s to the mid-2000s, he worked on popular children's shows produced by Nickelodeon and Disney Channel, including Kenan & Kel (1997), The Amanda Show (2000–2002), All That (2000–2003) and The Suite Life of Zack & Cody (2005–2008). In 2004, Peck was convicted of sexually assaulting Drake Bell in 2001, when Bell was 15 years old.

== Career ==
As an actor, Peck is best known for his role as Scuz in The Return of the Living Dead as well as Pickle Boy on All That, the latter of which employed him as a dialogue coach. Peck also appeared on Boy Meets World, Good Burger, Growing Pains and The Amanda Show. He also directed the comedy horror anthology film The Willies (1990). He was a body double for Kirk Cameron on Growing Pains.

After his release from prison, he was hired in 2005 to work on the Disney Channel teen sitcom The Suite Life of Zack & Cody. His crimes were overlooked in part due to character letters supporting him written by Richard and Beth Correll, directors of the show. He did voiceover work for three episodes but was later fired after Disney Channel executives learned of his conviction, and his voice lines and on-screen credits were replaced.

In 2012, Peck was a stand-in for Charlie Sheen on the FX sitcom Anger Management.

== Child sex abuse allegations and conviction ==
On August 19, 2003, Peck was arrested in California and charged with 11 counts of sexual misconduct with a minor and was held on a $400,000 bond. The charges included:

- Oral copulation by Anesthesia or Controlled Substance (PC 288a(i))
- Lewd Act upon a Child 14 or 15 by a Person 10 years older (PC 288(c)(1))
- Sodomy of a Person Under 16 (PC 288(b)(2))
- Attempt to commit Sodomy of a Person under 16 by a Person over 21 (PC 664-286(b)(2))
- Forcible Penetration with a Foreign Object (PC 289(i))
- 4 counts of Oral Copulation with a minor under 16 (PC 288a(b)(2))
- Harmful Matter sent: Seduction of a Minor (PC 288.2(a))
- Using Minor for Sex Acts (PC 311.4(c))

Peck entered a plea deal in May 2004 and pleaded no contest to "lewd acts upon a child 14 or 15 years of age" and "oral copulation with a minor under 16 years of age", referred to in the California Penal Code as 288(c)(1) and 288a(b)(2). Following his arrest and plea, over 40 high-profile professionals from the film and television industry submitted letters of support for Peck. These individuals included James Marsden, Kimmy Robertson, Taran Killam, Alan Thicke, Joanna Kerns, Rider Strong, Will Friedle, Ron Melendez (American Horror Story), Rich and Beth Correll, and Tom DeSanto.

At the sentencing hearing on October 18, 2004, the court heard in-person statements regarding the abuse, which court records show occurred over a four-month period in 2001 and 2002 when the victim was 15 years old. The underage male victim, later identified as Drake Bell, testified about the severe nature of the offenses, stating that he did not "think anyone [...] could have ever possibly imagined" them. His mother, Robin Dodson, and his stepfather stated that Peck had manipulated them and exploited their trust under the guise of supporting their son's career, while systematically isolating the teenager from his family. Deputy District Attorney Andrea C. Thompson countered industry letters submitted in support of the defendant, emphasizing "the psychological and emotional damage the defendant has likely done is immense, long-standing". Speaking on his own behalf, Peck expressed remorse, and described the victim as an "extremely talented" professional whom he had considered an "equal". Peck was sentenced to 16 months in state prison, which he served from 2004 to 2005, and was ordered to register as a sex offender for the rest of his life.

Peck's abusive conduct was discussed anonymously in the 2014 documentary An Open Secret, though the victim was not identified at the time. In March 2024, Investigation Discovery released Quiet on Set: The Dark Side of Kids TV, a docuseries addressing child sexual abuse in the entertainment industry. Bell appeared in the third episode, publicly revealing that he was the victim of Peck's sexual and psychological abuse during his time on The Amanda Show and Drake & Josh. Following the docuseries release, several individuals who had written support letters for Peck in 2004 publicly apologized, including the Corrells, Strong, Friedle, Kerns, and DeSanto.

== Personal life ==
Peck studied theater at the University of Southern California. He is openly gay. He lives in Los Angeles, California, as of 2025, and has not worked in the entertainment industry since 2019.

Kyle Sullivan, who performed with Peck in the Nickelodeon show All That, recounted in Quiet on Set that Peck had correspondence with the serial killer and child rapist John Wayne Gacy. Sullivan, who visited Peck's residence at the age of 14, recalled observing a significant volume of written communication exchanged between Peck and Gacy. Sullivan asserts that Gacy, who pursued painting while on death row, purportedly sent Peck an autographed painting of a clown, which Peck reportedly displayed in his residence at the time.

== Filmography ==
=== Film ===
Year	Title	Role	Notes
1982	The Last American Virgin	Victor	
1985	The Return of the Living Dead	Scuz	
1987	Like Father Like Son	Intern with Heart Patient	
1988	Return of the Living Dead Part II	Special Zombie	
1990	The Willies	KORN TV News Reporter	Also director, screenwriter, and executive producer
1993	Return of the Living Dead 3	Ballistic Technician	
1994	Angel 4: Undercover	Guitar Salesman	Also dialogue coach
1995	Children of the Corn III: Urban Harvest	Jake	Also ADR and dialogue coach
1997	Good Burger	Upset Customer	
1999	Man on the Moon	Fridays Announcer	
2000	X-Men	Hot Dog Stand Patron	Uncredited; also appears in DVD commentary track
2003	Holes	Townsman in Classroom	Also acting coach
2003	X2	News Reporter	
2005	Love Wrecked	TV Reporter #1	Also dialogue coach
2006	Outlaw Trail: The Treasure of Butch Cassidy	Clay	Also associate producer
2007	House of Fears	Creepy laugh (voice)	
2008	Forever Strong	Colton McDonald	Also associate producer
2008	Bedtime Stories	Bugsy Hero	Uncredited
2009	Bitch Slap	Wrong Place - Wrong Time	Also associate producer
2009	Jack and the Beanstalk	The Emperor	Uncredited; also dialogue coach
2015	Freaks of Nature	Zombie Dad	Uncredited

=== Television ===
Year	Title	Role	Notes
1988–1991	Growing Pains	Various characters	Also a body double for Kirk Cameron
1990	Just the Ten of Us	Doorman	S3E14: "Poetic Justice"
1993	Home Free	Guy	S1E4: "Prime Time"
1995	The Mommies	Minister	S2E13: "Four Mommies and a Funeral"
1995–1997	The Twisted Tales of Felix the Cat	Mr. Jolly (voice)	
1996	The Tick	Baron Violent (voice)	S3E4: "The Tick vs. Arthur"
1997	Kenan & Kel	Lottery Announcer	S2E3: "The Lottery"
1997	Clueless	Dr. Bongo (voice)	S2E10: "Intruder Spawn"
1998–1999	Guys Like Us	Customer #2/Mr. Happy Pants	Two episodes
1999	Boy Meets World	Cowboy #2/Ookie	Two episodes; also stand-in
2001	The Amanda Show	French Chef	S02E12: "Face & Zawyer"; Also dialogue coach
2002–2003	What I Like About You	Guy #1/Store Employee	Two episodes; also dialogue coach
2002–2003	All That	Pickle Boy/'Know Your Stars' Announcer	11 episodes; also dialogue coach
2006–2007	The Suite Life of Zack & Cody	Mirror (voice)	Three episodes; voice later replaced by Jim Meskimen
2013	Anger Management	TMZ Announcer	Uncredited; also dialogue coach

=== Video games ===
Year	Title	Role	Notes
1996	Tiny Toon Adventures: Buster and the Beanstalk		Also special thanks
2001	Jak and Daxter: The Precursor Legacy	Gambler	
2001	Planet of the Apes	Dr. Zaius / Cornelius / Ursus	
2001	Shenmue II		English dub
