= Bored to Death =

American comedy television series

- The opening title screen for Bored to Death features a detective novel with a film noir-esque cover
- Genre: Comedy; Detective comedy drama Crime; Mystery; Neo-noir
- Created by: Jonathan Ames
- Starring: Jason Schwartzman; Zach Galifianakis; Ted Danson; Heather Burns
- Opening theme: "Bored to Death" by Coconut Records
- Country of origin: United States
- No. of seasons: 3
- No. of episodes: 24

Production
- Executive producers: Jonathan Ames; Sarah Condon; Stephanie Davis; Dave Becky; Troy Miller; Tracey Baird
- Running time: approx. 26 minutes
- Production companies: Dakota Pictures; 3 Arts Entertainment; Fair Harbor Productions; HBO Entertainment

Original release
- Network: HBO
- Release: September 20, 2009 – November 28, 2011

Bored to Death is an American comedy series that ran on HBO from September 20, 2009, to November 28, 2011. The show was created by author Jonathan Ames, and stars Jason Schwartzman as a fictional Jonathan Ames—a writer based in Brooklyn, New York City, who moonlights as an unlicensed private detective. The show also stars Ted Danson as George and Zach Galifianakis as Ray, both friends of Jonathan. On December 20, 2011, HBO cancelled Bored to Death after three seasons and twenty-four episodes.

== Cast ==
=== Main ===
- Jason Schwartzman as Jonathan Ames, struggling novelist, Edition journalist, and bumbling private investigator
- Zach Galifianakis as Ray Hueston, comic book artist and Jonathan's best friend. The character is loosely based on comic book artist Dean Haspiel, a friend of the real Jonathan Ames. Haspiel also provides Ray's artwork used in the show.
- Ted Danson as George Christopher, libertine editor of fictitious New York magazine Edition, friend and father figure to Jonathan
- Heather Burns as Leah, Ray's on-and-off girlfriend

=== Recurring ===
- Olivia Thirlby as Suzanne, Jonathan's ex-girlfriend (season 1)
- Oliver Platt as Richard Antrem, fictional editor of GQ and George Christopher's rival.
- Laila Robins as Priscilla, George's ex-wife and Richard's current wife (seasons 1–2)
- John Hodgman as Louis Greene, a pompous author and rival of Jonathan
- Jenny Slate as Stella, an organic food co-op member and pot smoker who becomes Jonathan's lover (seasons 1–2)
- Michael Chernus as Francis Hamm (season 1)
- Zoe Kazan as Nina, Jonathan's student who later becomes his girlfriend (season 2)
- Bebe Neuwirth as Caroline, Jonathan's literary editor
- Patton Oswalt as Howard Baker, the owner of a spy shop that Jonathan, Ray, and George occasionally visit for gear
- Kristen Wiig as Jennifer "Trouble" Gladwell, a barfly and one of Jonathan's first clients (seasons 1–2)
- Jonathan Ames as Irwin, a Jewish man who Ray finds sleeping with Leah (season 2)
- Richard Masur as Ira Ames, Jonathan's father (seasons 2–3)
- Allyce Beasley as Florence Ames, Jonathan's mother (seasons 2–3)
- Mary Kay Place as Kathryn Joiner, a frank employee of a company that is helping Edition tighten its financial belt (season 2)
- Halley Feiffer as Emily, George's daughter who disturbs him with her engagement to an older man (season 3)
- David Rasche as Bernard, Emily's middle-aged fiancé (season 3)
- Olympia Dukakis as Belinda, an older woman with whom Ray cheats on Leah (seasons 2–3)
- Mary Steenburgen as Josephine, George's singing teacher and girlfriend (season 3)
- Isla Fisher as Rose, Jonathan's girlfriend. She is later revealed to be his half-sister, conceived in a fertility clinic that subsequently burned down as part of an insurance scam (season 3)
- Stacy Keach as Harrison Bergeron, Jonathan's biological father, operator of the fertility clinic, insurance scammer and con man (season 3)

== Episodes ==
| Season | Episodes | Originally released | |
| Season | Episodes | First released | Last released |
|---|---|---|---|
| 1 | 8 | September 20, 2009 | November 8, 2009 |
| 2 | 8 | September 26, 2010 | November 14, 2010 |
| 3 | 8 | October 10, 2011 | November 28, 2011 |

=== Season 1 (2009) ===
| No. overall | No. in season | Title | Directed by | Written by | Original release date | US viewers (millions) |
|---|---|---|---|---|---|---|
| 1 | 1 | "Stockholm Syndrome" | Alan Taylor | Jonathan Ames | September 20, 2009 | 1.00 |
Jonathan Ames (Jason Schwartzman), a thirty-year-old writer living in Brooklyn, casually smokes marijuana. On top of that, his girlfriend is going to break up with him. To stimulate his imagination, he publishes an ad on Craigslist claiming that he is an unlicensed private investigator.
| 2 | 2 | "The Alanon Case" | Alan Taylor | Jonathan Ames | September 27, 2009 | 0.71 |
During a fruitless attempt to reconquer Suzanne, Jonathan receives a phone call: a woman named Jennifer (Kristen Wiig) wants him to shadow her boyfriend Gary (Peter Hermann) to determine his fidelity.
| 3 | 3 | "The Case of the Missing Screenplay" | Michael Lehmann | Jonathan Ames | October 4, 2009 | 1.08 |
Jonathan has the opportunity to work on a scenario with the filmmaker Jim Jarmusch (who appears as himself) but it seems damaged when he forgets the script in the office of a therapist after an evening adventure with the therapist's daughter (Vanessa Ray). Guest stars: Oliver Platt, Laila Robins, Jessica Blank
| 4 | 4 | "The Case of the Stolen Skateboard" | Tucker Gates | Jonathan Ames | October 11, 2009 | 0.71 |
Jonathan tries to mix work and pleasure and allows himself to be seduced by a customer whose son's favorite skateboard was stolen. Guest star: Parker Posey
| 5 | 5 | "The Case of the Lonely White Dove" | Paul Feig | Jonathan Ames & Donick Cary | October 18, 2009 | 0.66 |
Jonathan agrees to search for the love of a Russian parolee in Brighton Beach, where Suzanne often noted she wanted to visit. Jonathan invites her out and is joined by Ray and Leah, who continue to experience marital/intimacy troubles. George is advised by his therapist to experiment with his sexuality to help him "find his feminine side," which might restore the waning female readership of the magazine.
| 6 | 6 | "The Case of the Beautiful Blackmailer" | Adam Bernstein | Jonathan Ames & Martin Gero | October 25, 2009 | 0.65 |
Jonathan is hired to track down a gorgeous Craigslist scammer who videotapes, then blackmails, married men. George, tired of high society's social obligations, insists on accompanying him and Ray on the case.
| 7 | 7 | "The Case of the Stolen Sperm" | Nicole Holofcener | Jonathan Ames & Donick Cary | November 1, 2009 | 0.72 |
Concerned over the sudden disappearance of the two lesbians who have been buying his sperm, Ray enlists Jonathan to help him track the couple down. After breaking into their apartment, Jonathan learns the pair has flown the coop—but not without leaving behind a clue that both shocks and intrigues Ray. Meanwhile, George ignores Jonathan's warnings by publishing a disparaging editorial about Richard Antrem (Oliver Platt), sending his publishing rival into a fit of rage at the local watering hole.
| 8 | 8 | "Take a Dive" | Paul Feig | Jonathan Ames & Martin Gero | November 8, 2009 | 0.63 |
Jonathan, Ray, and George prepare to fight the GQ team led by Richard. Jonathan receives phone calls threatening to publicly embarrass George, but "solves that case." George sleeps with Priscilla and she begs him to let Richard win the fight. Jonathan sleeps with Stella. At the match, Ray loses, Jonathan wins, and George lets Richard win.

=== Season 2 (2010) ===
| No. overall | No. in season | Title | Directed by | Written by | Original release date | US viewers (millions) |
|---|---|---|---|---|---|---|
| 9 | 1 | "Escape from the Dungeon!" | Alan Taylor | Jonathan Ames | September 26, 2010 | 1.05 |
Jonathan is hired by a police officer to erase the hard drive of an S&M dungeon computer to prevent potentially embarrassing information from coming out as the officer has received word that the club is about to be raided. Leah breaks it off with Ray. George is asked to cut back his expenses by his new publisher to prevent the magazine from going under. Guest stars: Kristen Johnston, Mary Kay Place, Zoe Kazan
| 10 | 2 | "Make It Quick, Fitzgerald!" | Alan Taylor | Jonathan Ames | October 3, 2010 | 1.08 |
Jonathan is hired by Richard to find out if his wife is cheating on him, and discovers she is—with George. Stella informs Jonathan that she is interested in having an "open" relationship. Ray attempts to win back Leah with a mix CD and a new comic, but finds a strange man in her bed. Guest stars: Josh Gad, Jonathan Ames
| 11 | 3 | "The Gowanus Canal Has Gonorrhea!" | Michael Lehmann | Martin Gero & Jonathan Ames | October 10, 2010 | 0.86 |
Jonathan is dumped by Stella and then kidnapped; George finds out that he has prostate cancer, then comes to Jonathan's rescue with the help of Ray.
| 12 | 4 | "I've Been Living Like a Demented God!" | Michael Lehmann | Donick Cary & Jonathan Ames | October 17, 2010 | 0.82 |
Jonathan hunts a valuable item for a professor (in a reference to General Sternwood in Raymond Chandler's The Big Sleep); George fails a drug test and has to come up with an alibi; Ray runs into a familiar barfly as he hits the bars to celebrate his newfound prosperity after his "Super Ray" comic book is picked up. Guest stars: Kristen Wiig, Mary Kay Place, F. Murray Abraham
| 13 | 5 | "Forty-Two Down!" | Troy Miller | Tami Sagher & Jonathan Ames | October 24, 2010 | 1.01 |
A poet whose lofty ambitions are corrupted by his having to work as a limousine driver runs into marital trouble, and Jonathan tries to bring him and his wife back together; Ray meets Kevin Bacon and isn't sure how to proceed. Guest stars: Kevin Bacon, Kristen Wiig, Zoe Kazan
| 14 | 6 | "The Case of the Grievous Clerical Error!" | Tristram Shapeero | Sam Sklaver & Jonathan Ames | October 31, 2010 | 0.69 |
With Ray's help, Jonathan finds Leah's dog, Little Ray, who has been dognapped; George goes into the hospital for prostate surgery. Special guest star: Olympia Dukakis; Guest stars: Laila Robins, Jessica Hecht, Kate Micucci
| 15 | 7 | "Escape from the Castle!" | Adam Bernstein | Donick Cary & Jonathan Ames | November 7, 2010 | 1.10 |
To celebrate Ray's birthday, Jonathan, George and Ray visit a spa. While there, Jonathan delivers a letter in the name of love. Jonathan stays after class with a student. Guest star: Zoe Kazan
| 16 | 8 | "Super Ray Is Mortal!" | Adam Bernstein | Martin Gero & Jonathan Ames | November 14, 2010 | 0.82 |
Ray has a stalker whom he and Jonathan track. At the magazine, George is forced to deal with his positive test for marijuana and a new slant to the magazine imposed by Dallas. Things come to a head at Comic-Con. Guest stars: Zoe Kazan, Jonathan Ames

=== Season 3 (2011) ===
| No. overall | No. in season | Title | Directed by | Written by | Original release date | US viewers (millions) |
|---|---|---|---|---|---|---|
| 17 | 1 | "The Blonde in the Woods" | Michael Lehmann | Jonathan Ames | October 10, 2011 | 0.24 |
After celebrating the release of his new book, Jonathan learns some distressing familial news. George reunites with his daughter Emily and Ray spends time with his biological son Spencer. Meanwhile, Jonathan's latest case leaves him in a precarious position.
| 18 | 2 | "Gumball!" | Michael Lehmann | Martin Gero & Jonathan Ames | October 17, 2011 | 0.25 |
On the run from the police, Jonathan and Ray turn to Howard (Patton Oswalt) for help with trying to find out who framed Jonathan for murder, while George runs interference for them in his own inimitable, marijuana-induced way.
| 19 | 3 | "The Black Clock of Time" | Michael Lehmann | Jonathan Ames | October 24, 2011 | 0.30 |
As a guest on 'The New Dick Cavett Show,' Jonathan runs into his nemesis. George is surprised to hear Bernard and Emily's news, and Ray sets off an AMBER Alert.
| 20 | 4 | "We Could Sing a Duet" | Michael Lehmann | Luke Del Tredici & Jonathan Ames | October 31, 2011 | 0.19 |
While showing Emily a youthful time, Jonathan discovers a classified ad for a detective (Brett Gelman) impersonating himself. On a night out with Bernard, George learns that Richard Antrem has opened a restaurant aimed at hurting George's restaurant. Ray, in hot water with Leah, finds himself drawn to a lonely woman named Belinda.
| 21 | 5 | "I Keep Taking Baths Like Lady Macbeth" | Tristram Shapeero | Sam Sklaver & Jonathan Ames | November 7, 2011 | 0.15 |
Jonathan and George try counseling to mend their relationship, but Jonathan thinks he might have better luck by investigating a rival's business practices. Meanwhile, George signs up for singing lessons; and Ray finds himself with an embarrassment of romantic riches.
| 22 | 6 | "Two Large Pearls and a Bar of Gold" | Tristram Shapeero | Mike Schwartz & Jonathan Ames | November 14, 2011 | 0.25 |
George and Ray tag along when Jonathan is hired by an old college flame (Casey Wilson) and her father (René Auberjonois) to guard her family's wedding jewels. Meanwhile, the bursting of Ray's romantic bubble forces him to move in with George.
| 23 | 7 | "Forget the Herring" | Adam Bernstein | Rachel Axler & Jonathan Ames | November 21, 2011 | 0.18 |
Rose Hiney (Isla Fisher) connects with Jonathan on some new leads. George and Ray attempt to right their unrightable wrongs.
| 24 | 8 | "Nothing I Can't Handle by Running Away" | Adam Bernstein | Jonathan Ames | November 28, 2011 | 0.23 |
Jonathan attempts to rescue his sperm-bank father (Stacy Keach) from captors and is held captive in turn. Ray and a crew of fans dressed as Super Ray rescue Jonathan.

== Production ==
Although loosely based in the Park Slope neighborhood of Brooklyn, the series is shot primarily on location in nearby Fort Greene, Brooklyn.

== Reception ==
The first season received favorable reviews, and holds a Metacritic score of 64/100, based on 27 reviews. In a Time blog, James Poniewozik praised the "interplay between the low- and high-life of New York" and the casting choices, calling Danson's portrayal of George a "scene-stealing role". Nancy Franklin of The New Yorker determined that "excellent casting and good writing" supported the series. However, in a blog for Chicago Tribune, Maureen Ryan called the story "tedious," although she praised Danson and Galifianakis' performances. Variety's Brian Lowry called the series "too precious and quirky for its own good," instead wishing the series revolved around Danson's character.

Reviews of the second season were favorable. Jennifer Armstrong of Entertainment Weekly said "the charm is in the details" and added that the "genius of Ted Danson and Zach Galifianakis" strengthened the program. TIME's Poniewozik wrote positively of the second season.

Following Curb Your Enthusiasm, Bored to Death had an audience retention rating of 92 percent of the total 1.1 million person audience according to Nielsen ratings.

Bored to Death won the 2010 Primetime Emmy Award for Main Title Design, against other nominees including The Pacific and Nurse Jackie.

On December 20, 2011, the day Bored to Death was canceled, petitions on several websites including Facebook started circulating. Jonathan Ames responded to this by stating "It's very sweet. I don't want to discourage it, but I'm embarrassed."

== Distribution ==
HBO Home Entertainment and Warner Home Video released the complete first season on September 21, 2010, the complete second season on October 4, 2011, and the third season on September 4, 2012.

== Potential movie ==
After much speculation, it was announced in early 2013 that HBO would revive Bored to Death in the form of a feature-length network film. In March 2014, Jonathan Ames announced he was nearly done writing the script. In an interview in August 2015, Ames said he had done two iterations of the script, neither of which was quite right, and planned a third. In an interview in April 2018, however, Ames said that a movie is unlikely to be made, though he was considering rebooting the series as a book.
