= Eagleheart (TV series) =

American action-comedy television series

- Genre: Action comedy Parody; Surreal humor
- Created by: Michael Koman; Andrew Weinberg
- Starring: Chris Elliott; Maria Thayer; Brett Gelman; Michael Gladis; Jack Wallace; Pete Gardner
- Country of origin: United States
- No. of seasons: 3
- No. of episodes: 34

Production
- Executive producers: Michael Koman; Andrew Weinberg; Jason Woliner; Troy Miller; Tracey Baird; David Kissinger; Conan O'Brien; Richard Schwartz
- Producers: AJ DiAntonio; Ollie Green
- Running time: 11 minutes, with the exception of three double-length episodes in season 3
- Production companies: Dakota Pictures; Conaco; Williams Street

Original release
- Network: Adult Swim
- Release: February 3, 2011 – January 16, 2014

Eagleheart is an American action comedy television series that aired on the programming block Adult Swim. Eagleheart was produced by Conan O'Brien's production company, Conaco, and stars Chris Elliott as Chris Monsanto. The series aired from 2011 to 2014.

== Premise ==
Eagleheart follows U.S. Marshal Chris Monsanto as he fights crime with his two partners: the slow-witted Brett and by-the-book Susie. They take on drug smugglers, art thieves, kidnappers, and con artists with bloody violence and gruesome deaths ensuing. The Marshals report to The Chief, who gives them their assignments. There is little continuity between episodes in the first two seasons. The third season features an extended season-long storyline titled Paradise Rising.

Eagleheart parodies many cop shows, most notably Walker, Texas Ranger. It portrays a great deal of graphic violence.

== Cast ==
Name	Character(s)
Chris Elliott	Chris Monsanto
Maria Thayer	Susie Wagner
Brett Gelman	Brett Mobley
Michael Gladis	Chief (Season 1-2)
Jack Wallace	Captain (Season 2-3)
Pete Gardner	Dr. Gardner

== Episodes ==
=== Series overview ===
Season	Episodes	Originally aired	
Season	Episodes	First aired	Last aired
1	12	February 3, 2011	April 21, 2011
2	12	April 12, 2012	June 28, 2012
3	10	November 14, 2013	January 16, 2014

=== Season 1 (2011) ===
No. overall	No. in season	Title	Directed by	Original release date	Prod. code
1	1	"Get Worse Soon"	Jason Woliner	February 3, 2011	107
Marshal Chris Mansanto is assigned two new partners when his latest is killed in a shootout with a crime lord Vargas (Roger Guenveur Smith). When he finds out Vargas wasn't killed, Monsanto attempts to gain vengeance at the hospital, only to find him in a brain damaged state, and decides to help rehab him first.
2	2	"Creeps"	Eric Appel	February 10, 2011	110
A local creep is murdered in the area and Chris must assemble a competent team of marshals to investigate the case. Along the way, damaging secrets are uncovered that threaten to tear the entire force apart.
3	3	"Master of Da'Skies"	Eric Appel	February 17, 2011	109
Chris learns of a shocking loophole in the town's law. In the sky, there are no laws and a baron rules the sky underworld in his flying zeppelin Cloudtopia.
4	4	"Me Llamo Justice"	Jason Woliner	February 24, 2011	108
The news of potentially sinister plots forces Chris and his team to take a trip south of the Mexico–US border and investigate the country of Mexico in the hopes of bringing dangerous villains to justice.
5	5	"Death Punch"	Jason Woliner	March 3, 2011	101
Chris is devastated after resorting to use a deadly punch.
6	6	"Double Your Displeasure"	Jason Woliner	March 10, 2011	102
Chris encounters twins from his past that turn out to be more than they initially appear and force him to deal with the harsh reality that his past may not be as upstanding and just as he remembers.
7	7	"Chris, Susie, Brett, and Malice"	Jason Woliner	March 17, 2011	105
The Marshals accidentally are witnesses to a lethal mob execution and are forced to go into hiding as to avoid retribution; Chris and his team are afforded shocking new identities and are assigned to temporary new roles.
8	8	"Susie's Song"	Jay Karas	March 24, 2011	111
Chris tracks another dangerous fugitive who has a connection to Susie; Susie’s connection to a fugitive teaches her an important lesson about the shocking qualities that love can sometimes provide.
9	9	"The Human Bat"	Jason Woliner	March 31, 2011	106
Chris and his team’s investigation of a fugitive calls into question the respect afforded to Brett, and leads him to make a drastic decision in order to gain the stature within the team he feels he deserves.
10	10	"Once in a Wattle"	Jason Woliner	April 7, 2011	103
A hunt for missing seniors prompts Chris to go undercover. (Special guest appearances by Mickey Rooney and George Murdock)
11	11	"Danger: Mountain Lions"	Troy Miller	April 14, 2011	104
Chris goes on a search for a mountain lion he once cared for.
12	12	"A Mug of Chili and a Bowl of Death"	Jay Karas	April 21, 2011	112
Chris is left to investigate the disappearance of many of his marshal comrades, but the search proves tiresome and he's forced to rest for a hearty meal.

=== Season 2 (2012) ===
No. overall	No. in season	Title	Directed by	Original release date	Prod. code	US viewers (millions)
13	1	"Gabey, Calvin and Stu"	Jason Woliner	April 12, 2012	201	1.40
Marshal Chris Monsanto's past comes back to haunt him - or does it?
14	2	"Bringing Up Beezor"	Benjamin Berman	April 19, 2012	205	1.67
Brett's cherished bezoar turns out to be more than he bargained for.
15	3	"Silly Sammy"	Jason Woliner	April 26, 2012	202	1.44
An organ thief is on the prowl in Elmwood Park and the marshals must go undercover to catch him. His identity will shock you. (Special Guest: Ben Stiller as Silly Sammy)
16	4	"Blues"	Jason Woliner	May 3, 2012	206	1.43
Chris goes on a journey to discover the blues - and learns that it may be in danger. (Special Guest: Dean Norris as Deke)
17	5	"Little Dude"	Jason Woliner	May 10, 2012	208	1.66
To catch a judge-killing hermaphrodite, Susie must go undercover. (Special Guest: Kelly Mantle as 'Maph)
18	6	"Tinselwood"	Peter Lauer	May 17, 2012	203	1.61
When a killer releases a hit list that includes some of the biggest stars in showbiz, Chris, Brett and Susie must head to Tinselwood, similar to Hollywood, to stop him. (Special Guest: Neil Ross as an announcer)
19	7	"Beat Shack"	Peter Lauer	May 24, 2012	210	1.58
When the town's newest crime boss kills the town's favorite hardware merchant, the marshals use extreme measures to catch him. Plus: Doc Shades finds a second career.
20	8	"Honor Thy Marshal"	Jason Woliner	May 31, 2012	212	1.53
A behind-the-scenes look at the U.S. Marshals Service. Do you have what it takes to become a U.S. Marshal? (Guest star: Conan O'Brien as himself)
21	9	"Exit Wound the Gift Shop"	Benjamin Berman	June 7, 2012	209	1.58
Chris's signature blood splatters turn him into an art world star - but will success ruin the nation's top marshal? (Guest Star: Bud Cort as Gleeko)
22	10	"Tramps"	Jason Woliner	June 14, 2012	207	1.55
The king of the tramps goes missing and the marshals realize that something stinks - and it isn't just the tramps themselves. (Guest Star: Frank Collison as Shoestring)
23	11	"Bringing Down Bunju"	Jason Woliner	June 21, 2012	211	1.34
When Chris, Brett and Susie bring a brutal dictator to justice, they learn that marshaling isn't all fun and games. Although sometimes it is games. But not fun.
24	12	"Old Gary"	Jason Woliner	June 28, 2012	204	1.48
The Marshals are called to the woods to quell tensions between loggers and some local activists. They uncover a lot more than you were expecting.

=== Season 3 (2013–14) ===
Season three's linked story arc is called Paradise Rising. The first, second, and final episode run 22 minutes each.

No. overall	No. in season	Title	Directed by	Written by	Original release date	US viewers (millions)
25	1	"Moss"	Jason Woliner	Michael Koman, Andrew Weinberg, & Jason Woliner	November 14, 2013	N/A
Chris deals with the aftermath of a tragedy involving Brett and a blackmail plot.
26	2	"Whitley"	Jason Woliner	Michael Koman, Andrew Weinberg, & Jason Woliner	November 21, 2013	N/A
Susie pitches her television show. Chris covers up what he has done.
27	3	"Bowsley"	Jason Woliner	Michael Koman, Andrew Weinberg, & Jason Woliner	November 28, 2013	N/A
The Marshals take on Junkyard Steve. Susie makes a decision regarding Chris after the debut of her television show.
28	4	"Grandy"	Jason Woliner	Michael Koman, Andrew Weinberg, & Jason Woliner	December 5, 2013	N/A
Chris fights for a bunk in a homeless shelter and discovers the secrets of the Marshal Service. Susie gets a promotion.
29	5	"America"	Jason Woliner	Michael Koman, Andrew Weinberg, & Jason Woliner	December 12, 2013	N/A
Chris is put on trial, escapes and goes on the run. Featuring the return of the death punch.
30	6	"Joe"	Jason Woliner	Michael Koman & Andrew Weinberg	December 19, 2013	1.26
Chris meets Joe Estevez. (Guest star: Joe Estevez as himself)
31	7	"Quint"	Jason Woliner	Michael Koman, Andrew Weinberg, & Jason Woliner	December 26, 2013	N/A
Chris learns the secrets of the Marshals from his old Mentor and encounters Paradise Rising.
32	8	"Spats"	Jason Woliner	Brian Reich	January 2, 2014	N/A
Chris attempts to solve the shoe problems of the town of Millbrook. (Guest stars: Jill Talley as Doreen and Michael D. Cohen as Spats)
33	9	"Gribbs"	Jason Woliner	Michael Koman, Andrew Weinberg, & Jason Woliner	January 9, 2014	N/A
Chris searches for Brett in the Amazon, finds love and meets an old friend. (Guest star: Jill Talley as Doreen)
34	10	"Honch"	Jason Woliner	Michael Koman, Andrew Weinberg, & Jason Woliner	January 16, 2014	N/A
The search for Brett concludes, Susie finds her place in the world and Chris meets his final destiny.

== International broadcast ==
In Canada, Eagleheart previously aired on G4's Adult Digital Distraction block, and currently airs on the Canadian version of Adult Swim.
