= The Willies (film) =

- Directed by: Brian Peck
- Written by: Brian Peck
- Produced by: Talaat Captan
- Starring: Sean Astin
- Edited by: James Eaton
- Music by: Randy Miller
- Distributed by: Force Majeure Productions
- Release date: December 27, 1990
- Running time: 91 minutes
- Country: United States
- Language: English

The Willies is a 1990 American comedy horror anthology film, written and directed by Brian Peck. The film was shot in both California and Connecticut, and features cameos by several recognizable genre and character actors.

== Plot ==
=== Prologue ("Camping Out") ===
In a frame story, two brothers, Kyle and Josh, and their cousin, Michael (Sean Astin), gather around a campfire and decide to tell scary stories to one another, each one of which they claim to be absolutely true (in the style of urban legends). In the first ten minutes of the film (even before the opening credits), they tell a series of brief stories:

- "Tennessee Frickasee" - A woman at a fast food restaurant finds a rat in her fried chicken.
- "Haunted Estate" - An old man (Bill Erwin) dies of a heart attack after experiencing the terrors of an amusement park's horror ride.
- "Poodle Souffle" - An old woman puts her toy poodle in the microwave to dry off (with predictable results).

At this point, Michael says he knows a story they haven't heard of yet (Kyle asks if it's about when his friends "found the pirate ship in that old cave," a reference to Astin's earlier film The Goonies), and promises that this story will give them the willies.

=== "Bad Apples" ===
A young boy named Danny struggles at his school with bullies and an overbearing, impatient teacher (Kathleen Freeman). The only one who shows him any sympathy is the school custodian, Mr. Jenkins (James Karen). While on duty, Mr. Jenkins disappears in the bathroom, and Danny enters later to find Mr. Jenkins' body with a detached head, and a humanoid monster lurking in the stall. Danny tells his teacher, who goes into the bathroom to investigate, only to be killed by the monster. Danny lures the three bullies into the bathroom, and they too are killed brutally. It is soon revealed that Mr. Jenkins was the monster all the time, with his body being a disguise.

Mr. Jenkins moves to another school, where it is revealed that he is still targeting bullies as he just killed a boy named Jordie.

=== Interlude ===
Michael explains that his father, the brothers' Uncle Henry, knew Mr. Jenkins personally, hence the accuracy of the story. Kyle and Josh say they have an even stranger story to tell.

=== "Flyboy" ===
Gordy Belcher (Michael Bower) is a reclusive, mischievous kid who often plays pranks on others, and who is overly obsessed with flies (even pinning them into positions inside a model church). He becomes fascinated with a secret manure created by Farmer Spivey, which causes crops to grow in increased sizes. He often steals the manure from the old man, much to Spivey's chagrin.

After being kicked out of the school after tricking a girl into eating flies, Gordy stops by Spivey's farm, where the old man offers him a special manure with new ingredients, as a way to "call a truce." Gordy goes home to find his mother has thrown away all his flies, save for three he kept in a hiding spot. He places them in the jar of manure which causes the flies to grow to an immense size overnight. They attack Gordy when he wakes up, and the boy's parents find him with bloody stumps where his arms were. Gordy awakes the next day with prosthetic replacements.

=== Epilogue ===
The brothers explain that Gordy is now made fun of by the kids he used to pick on. Michael is incredulous, to which the brothers contend that Michael's story was far less believable. At that point, Uncle Henry arrives, and the brothers ask him to prove the story about Mr. Jenkins. Uncle Henry (also played by James Karen) then rips off his face, revealing the humanoid monster from "Bad Apples".

== Cast ==
- Sean Astin as Michael
- Jason Horst as Kyle
- Joshua John Miller as Josh
- James Karen as Uncle Harry / Mr. Jenkins
- Clu Gulager as Custodian Jenkins
- Kathleen Freeman as Miss Titmarch
- Michael Bower as Gordy Belcher
- Kirk Cameron as Mike Seaver
- Tracey Gold as Carol Seaver
- Jeremy Miller as Brad
- Mike Pniewski as Mr. Belcher
- Chelsea Noble as Anchor Woman
- Dana Ashbrook as Tough Dude
- Kimmy Robertson as Ride Operator
- Bill Erwin as Old Man
- Doug Benson as Zombie (as Doug Benson)

== Reception ==
The film has received generally negative reviews over the years. The film received 1.5 out of 5 stars by the editors of AllMovie. Culture author J.W. Ocker writes that despite "some legitimately creepy scenarios and special effects", the stories "aren't well put together" and the film's horror serves as "extremely minor stimuli".

Horror movie critic John McCarty does compliment it, calling it a "little gem" and a "terrific hybrid of horror movie and comic book".

"Lor." of Variety criticized the film, writing that it's "an uneven anthology horror opus that shows more creativity in the creatures department than in the writing. It's a video release aimed at younger patrons than usual for the genre."
