= Troy Miller (film producer) =

American film director

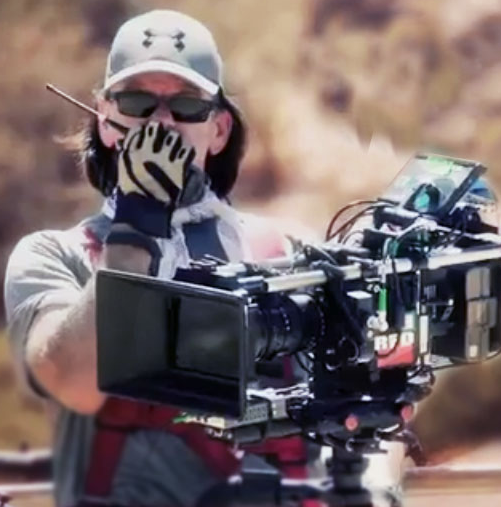
- Miller as director/camera operator
- Born: United States
- Occupations: Film director, cinematographer, screenwriter, producer, editor
- Years active: 1981–present

Troy Miller is an American film producer, director and screenwriter. He is best known for his work in comedy and has directed four feature films as well as directing and producing numerous TV shows and specials.

== Career ==
Miller directed the Mark Twain Prize for American Humor Mark Twain Prize with Julia Louis-Dreyfus at the Kennedy Center and produced the 2013 and 2019 seasons of Arrested Development, for Netflix. Miller produced and directed all episodes of Brian Regan's Stand-up and Away with Brian Regan for Netflix. George Lopez: The Wall, live comedy concert for HBO. Another live special for HBO featured Bill Maher closing his HBO series, then on to a live stand up special Bill Maher: Live from DC. Comedy Central's first-ever live standup special was Brian Regan Live From Radio City Music Hall, produced and directed by Miller. Miller produced and directed the first season of Hulu's Deadbeat. Deadbeat premiered on April 9, 2014, to positive reviews and was #1 site-wide the day it dropped on Hulu. Currently, Miller has several projects in development through his production company Dakota Pictures.

Prior to Arrested, he also executive produced and directed HBO's George Lopez: It's Not Me, It's You, a live comedy concert and one of HBO's most watched events of 2012. Miller has produced and/or directed specials for a variety of many other comedians including Robin Williams, Martin Short, Katt Williams, Jim Gaffigan, Brian Regan, Dave Chappelle, David Cross, Kathleen Madigan, Jeff Garlin, and David Alan Grier. Also in 2012, Miller created and executive produced (with Russell Brand), Brand X with Russell Brand for FX. In its second season Brand X became FX's first weekly live series (also directed by Miller).

Miller has produced and directed short- and long-form programming for all of the major networks (ABC, NBC, CBS, Fox) and cable outlets such as MTV, Comedy Central, Bravo, TBS, Disney XD, and many others including the BBC. Some notable projects from Miller's past include Mr. Show with Bob and David and Tenacious D for HBO, on which Miller served as both executive producer and director. In 2003, Miller created Viva La Bam along with celebrity skater Bam Margera for MTV; by 2005 it was the most watched cable show for teens aged 12–18. Miller's first industry job was as an intern on the show Fridays, working under the tutelage of comics such as Rich Hall, Larry David and Andy Kaufman. Miller directed all episodes in the first two seasons of the Emmy-nominated Tracey Ullman's State of the Union for Showtime, and regularly directed episodes of NBC's Parks and Recreation and The Office. Miller is executive producer and one of the directors for both seasons of the acclaimed shows Flight of the Conchords as well as HBO's Bored to Death.

Miller has also produced and directed eight opening films for the Academy Awards Oscar telecast, including those featuring Billy Crystal, Jon Stewart, James Franco and Anne Hathaway. He is the creator of this "short film opening award show format" that ultimately began with the MTV Movie Awards. His films have served as the opening for twenty awards shows. Miller is one of the creators of the short-form genre of films that have become common in award show openings. Having produced and directed many MTV Movie Awards opens, including the two most recent shows hosted by Conan O'Brien and Rebel Wilson respectively. Miller produced and directed all of the short films that have opened the Oscar telecast. The 84th annual show featured Tom Cruise and George Clooney and again featured Billy Crystal (embedded within the footage of other films). In 2006, Jon Stewart used Miller to construct his Oscar open which featured Clooney, Chris Rock, Halle Berry, Steve Martin and David Letterman. Miller also directed the opening film for the 83rd Academy Awards parodying Inception, featuring hosts Franco and Hathaway embedded in Best Picture nominees and cameo appearances by Alec Baldwin and Morgan Freeman. Miller also crafted the opening film for Bette Midler's Las Vegas stage show, The Showgirl Must Go On as well as has directed well a huge array of other short films for various sketch programs and live presentations and film festivals.

The director of four feature films, Miller is probably best known for directing the seasonal film Jack Frost, starring Michael Keaton. Miller also produced and directed the Mr. Show spin-off movie Run Ronnie Run!. Among other features and movie-of-the-week productions, Miller also directed Dumb and Dumberer: When Harry Met Lloyd, a moderate commercial success in first release. The film was poorly received by critics, but went on to earn upwards of $80 million in international box office.

== Filmography (some production credits, others directing credits) ==
=== Standup comedy ===
- Jeff Dunham Beside Himself (Netflix) 2019
- The Standups 2.0 (Netflix) 2018
- George Lopez The Wall - Live (HBO) 2017
- Brian Regan Nunchucks and Flamethrowers (Netflix) 2017
- Brian Regan Live From Rockefeller Plaza (Comedy Central) 2016
- The Standups 1.0 (Netflix) 2016
- Natasha Leggero (Comedy Central) 2015
- Bill Maher: Live from D.C. (HBO) 2014
- George Lopez: It's Not Me, It's You (HBO) 2012
- Bill Maher: CrazyStupidPolitics - Live from Silicon Valley (Yahoo!) 2012
- David Alan Grier: Comedy You Can Believe In (TBS) 2009
- Martin Short: Let Freedom Hum (TBS) 2009
- Jim Gaffigan: King Baby (Comedy Central) 2009
- Jo Koy: Don't Make Him Angry (Comedy Central) 2009
- Katt Williams: It's Pimpin Pimpin 2008
- Brian Regan: The Epitome of Hyperbole (Comedy Central) 2008
- John Oliver: Terrifying Times (Comedy Central) 2008
- David Cross: The Pride Is Back (HBO) 1999
- George Carlin: Playin' with Your Head (MPI Home Video) 1986
- The Young Comedians All-Star Reunion (HBO) 1986
- Robin Williams: An Evening at the Met (HBO) 1986
- Don Rickles: Rickles on the Loose (Showtime) 1986

=== Episodic television ===
- Arrested Development (Netflix) 31 episodes, 2013–2019
- Lopez (TV Land) 10 episodes, 2016
- Deadbeat (Hulu) 10 episodes, 2015
- Brooklyn Nine-Nine (Fox) 1 episode, 2013
- The Goldbergs (ABC) 1 episode, 2013
- Arrested Development (Netflix) 16 episodes, 2013–2015
- Brand X with Russell Brand (FX) 26 episodes, 2012–2013
- The Office (NBC) 3 episodes, 2011–2013
- New Girl (Fox) 1 episode, 2012
- Underemployed (MTV) 3 episodes, 2012
- Breaking In (Fox) 1 episode, 2012
- The L.A. Complex (CW) 4 episodes, 2012
- Best Friends Forever (NBC), 2012
- Up All Night (NBC) 4 episodes, 2011-2012
- Eagleheart (Adult Swim) 1 episode, 2011
- Parks and Recreation (NBC) 7 episodes, 2009–2012
- Greg and Donny (IFC) 1 episode, 2011
- Raising Hope (Fox) 1 episode, 2011
- Happy Endings (ABC) 1 episode, 2011
- Outsourced (NBC) 1 episode, 2011
- Perfect Couples (NBC) 1 episode, 2011
- Running Wilde (FX) 3 episodes, 2010–2011
- Bored to Death (HBO) 15 episodes, 2009–2011
- Tracey Ullman's State of the Union (Showtime) 12 episodes, 2008–2010
- Wait Wait... Don't Tell Me! (CBS) 2008
- Flight of the Conchords (HBO) 2007-2009
- Just For Laughs (ABC) 3 episodes, 2007
- The Showbiz Show with David Spade (Comedy Central) 1 episode, 2005
- Viva La Bam (MTV) 39 episodes, 2003-2005
- Reel Comedy (Comedy Central) 1 episode, 2002
- Greg The Bunny (Fox) 2002
- Tenacious D (HBO) 2 episodes, 1999-2000
- HBO Comedy Half-Hour (HBO) 2 episodes, 1997–1998
- Mr. Show with Bob and David (HBO) 30 episodes, 1995–1998
- The Jenny McCarthy Show (MTV) 3 episodes, 1997
- Saturday Night Special (Fox) 2 episodes, 1996
- The Bill Bellamy Show (MTV) 1 episode, 1996
- Weird Science (USA) 3 episodes, 1995
- Running the Halls (NBC) 1 episode, 1993
- The Ben Stiller Show (Fox) 7 episodes, 1992
- Arresting Behavior (ABC) 1 episode, 1992
- The Real World (MTV) 13 episodes, 1992
- The Sunday Comics (Fox) 1 episode, 1991
- Pee Wee's Playhouse (CBS) 45 episodes, 1986–1991
- SK8 TV (MTV) 1 episode, 1990
- Not Necessarily The News (HBO) 60 episodes, 1982–1990
- The Super Mario Bros. Super Show! (DiC) 65 episodes, 1989
- Madame's Place (Comedy Central) 31 episodes, 1982
- Fridays (ABC) 1 episode, 1980

=== TV movies ===
- Wyclef Jean in America (HBO) 2008
- Like Father, Like Sunday (Comedy Central) 2006
- Van Stone: Tour of Duty 2006
- Celebrity Autobiography: In Their Own Words (Bravo) 2005
- The Show with A.J. Calloway (Sony Pictures TV) 2005
- David Blaine: Vertigo (Virgil Films) 2002
- Super Nerds (Comedy Central) 2000
- Mr. Show and the Incredible, Fantastical New Report (HBO) 1998
- Save Our Streets (NBC) 1997
- Beverly Hills Family Robinson (ABC) 1997
- Mr. Show with Bob and David: Fantastic Newness (HBO) 1996
- Best Defense (CBS) 1994
- Madonna: Blond Ambition World Tour Live (Pioneer Artists) 1990
- Tales from the Whoop: Hot Rod Brown Class Clown (MTV) 1990
- Christmas at Pee Wee's Playhouse (CBS) 1988
- Harry Anderson's Hello Sucker (Showtime) 1986
- Mystery Magical Special (Nickelodeon) 1986

=== Short films ===
- 2014 MTV Movie Awards (MTV) 2014
- The 65th Primetime Emmy Awards (CBS) 2013
- 2013 MTV Movie Awards (MTV) 2013
- The 84th Academy Awards (ABC) 2012
- The 63rd Primetime Emmy Awards (FOX) 2011
- 2011 MTV Movie Awards (MTV) 2011
- The 83rd Academy Awards (ABC) 2011
- 2010 MTV Movie Awards (MTV) 2010
- 2009 MTV Movie Awards (MTV) 2009
- 2008 MTV Movie Awards (MTV) 2008
- The 78th Academy Awards (ABC) 2006
- The 76th Academy Awards (ABC) 2004
- The 72nd Academy Awards (ABC) 2000
- 1999 MTV Movie Awards (MTV) 1999
- The 70th Academy Awards (ABC) 1998
- The 69th Academy Awards (ABC) 1997
- 1997 MTV Movie Awards (MTV) 1997
- 1996 MTV Movie Awards (MTV) 1996
- 1995 MTV Movie Awards (MTV) 1995
- 1993 MTV Movie Awards (MTV) 1993

=== Feature films ===
- Kathy Griffin: A Hell of a Story (Fathom) 2019
- Dumb and Dumberer: When Harry Met Lloyd (New Line) 2003
- Run Ronnie Run! (New Line) 2002
- The Announcement (BBC) 2000
- Jack Frost (Warner Bros.) 1998

== Awards ==
Primetime Emmy Award Nominee

- The 83rd Annual Academy Awards (ABC) 2011 - Outstanding Short-Form Picture Editing
- Flight of The Conchords (HBO) 2009 - Outstanding Comedy Series
- The 78th Annual Academy Awards (ABC) 2006 - Outstanding Picture Editing for a Special (Single or Multi-Camera)
- The 76th Annual Academy Awards (ABC) 2004 - Outstanding Multi-Camera Picture Editing for a Miniseries, Movie or a Special

Daytime Emmy Award Nominee

- Tales from the Whoop: Hot Rod Brown Class Clown (MTV) 1991 - Outstanding Children's Special

CableACE Awards Nominee

- 1993 MTV Movie Awards (MTV) 1993 - Variety Special or Series
