= Mr. Show with Bob and David =

American sketch comedy television series

- Created by: Bob Odenkirk; David Cross
- Starring: Bob Odenkirk; David Cross; John Ennis; Tom Kenny; Jill Talley; Jay Johnston
- Theme music composer: Mark Rivers
- Composers: Mark Rivers; Eban Schletter
- Country of origin: United States
- No. of seasons: 4
- No. of episodes: 30

Production
- Executive producers: David Cross; Troy Miller; Bob Odenkirk; John Moffitt; Dino Stamatopoulos; Brad Grey; Bernie Brillstein
- Producers: Bill Odenkirk; Jay Johnston
- Running time: 30 minutes
- Production companies: Brillstein-Grey Communications; Dakota North Entertainment; TriStar Television; (1995); (season 1); HBO; (1995); (season 1); HBO Original Programming; (1996–1998); (seasons 2–4)

Original release
- Network: HBO
- Release: November 3, 1995 – December 28, 1998

Mr. Show with Bob and David, also known as Mr. Show, is an American sketch comedy television series starring and hosted by Bob Odenkirk and David Cross. It aired on HBO from November 3, 1995, to December 28, 1998.

Cross and Odenkirk introduce most episodes as semi-fictionalized versions of themselves, before transitioning to a mixture of on-stage sketches performed in front of a live audience and pre-taped segments. The show features an ensemble of actors and of alternative comedians as both cast members and writers, including Sarah Silverman, Paul F. Tompkins, Jack Black, Karen Kilgariff, Tom Kenny, Mary Lynn Rajskub, Brian Posehn, Scott Adsit, Jill Talley, Scott Aukerman, Jerry Minor, Jay Johnston, and Dino Stamatopoulos.

It was nominated for four Primetime Emmy Awards and one Golden Satellite Award. The show is currently available on HBO Max.

== Format ==
Each episode of Mr. Show consists of a series of sketches, at times surreal, each one transitioning to the next by a link in a manner reminiscent of Monty Python's Flying Circus or The State. For example, a minor character in one sketch might return as the major character in the next. Often, common themes or storylines are returned to at different times throughout an episode. As a premium cable show, its audience was limited. DVD editions, however, opened the show to a broad new audience.

Every episode begins with an individual introducing the hosts. This role was filled by Mary Lynn Rajskub in the first two seasons. After her departure for personal reasons, the introduction was made by a random character from that week's episode.

Episode titles were mostly quotes from the episode. For example, "Bush Is a Pussy" is written on a T-shirt worn by one of the characters. One of the exceptions is "Eat Rotten Fruit from a Shitty Tree", which is a line in a song within the episode that was eventually performed as an instrumental.

Certain lines of dialogue are often repeated by different characters during the course of a single show. For example there was "I was on the eighteenth hole!" in "The Biggest Failure in Broadway History" and "Who Let You In?" in the episode of the same name.

At the end of each episode's credits, a random celebrity is listed in the "Special Thanks" section. Examples include Rick Dees in the first episode and Greg Maddux in the third.

== Episodes ==
Season	Episodes	Originally released	
Season	Episodes	First released	Last released
1	4	November 3, 1995	November 24, 1995
2	6	November 15, 1996	December 20, 1996
3	10	September 12, 1997	December 5, 1997
4	10	October 26, 1998	December 28, 1998

=== Season 1 (1995) ===
No. overall	No. in season	Title	Original release date	Prod. code
1	1	"The Cry of a Hungry Baby"	November 3, 1995	101
Sketches: Entitilitus (Cold Open), Hitler Sings / Guys In Audience (Open), Hit By Truck, Asshole At Party, Watching VCR (Link), Change For A Dollar, Ronnie Dobbs, Ronnie Dobbs Movie, Incubation Pants / Show Sponsor (Close)
2	2	"What to Think"	November 10, 1995	102
Sketches: Arts Funding (Cold Open), Tracking Collar (Open), Old Swerdlow, Books For Seniors, Good News, Jesus & Marshal (The 13th Apostle), Announcements, Commercials Of The Future (Globo-Chem), The Joke: The Musical, Senator Tankerbell (Tag)
3	3	"We Regret to Inform You"	November 17, 1995	103
Sketches: Letters (Dear Globo-Chem / Mail Order Bride) (Open), Kissing Booth, Gay Porn Titles (Link), Third Wheel, Writer In Audience, Skrewballz, Video Complaints, Borden Grote, Soul Singer (Larry Black), Supermodel Hotline, Film Festival (Close)
4	4	"Who Let You In?"	November 24, 1995	104
Sketches: Watching Chase Of The Chaste (Open), Popemobile Chase / News, Dudes Arguing (Link), Nil's Guitar Shop, Imminent Death Syndrome, Trial Of The Millennium, Spank, Expert Truck, Founding Fathers, History Museum, Watching Murders (Close)

=== Season 2 (1996) ===
No. overall	No. in season	Title	Original release date	Prod. code
5	1	"Now Who Wants Ice Cream?"	November 15, 1996	201
Sketches: Cabin In Woods (Cold Open), Sovereign Nation (Open), Mountain Dougie (Part 1), Peterson Family News (KPFN), Miracles (Link), Thrilling Miracles, Ernie Flies, Mountain Dougie (Part 2), Shampoo, F.F. Woodycooks, Independent Nations Games, Old Man In House (Tag)
6	2	"A Talking Junkie"	November 22, 1996	202
Sketches: David Acts English, Rap (Open), Talking Junkie, New Son, Red Balloon, Mom & Pop Porn Shop, Ewww Girl Video, Video Soul, Rap! The Musical, Homage Awards, Creepy Peeping Videos (Tag)
7	3	"The Biggest Failure in Broadway History"	November 29, 1996	203
Sketches: Beating Hippie (Open), No Adults Allowed, No Slackers, New KKK (Link), Ad Awards, Mob Chase (Link), Drunk Cops, Iguana, Pet Funeral (Link), Jeepers Creepers – Semi-Star, Hippie Pie (Close), Hippie Pie (Tag)
8	4	"If You're Going to Write a Comedy Scene, You're Going to Have Some Rat Feces in There"	December 6, 1996	204
Sketches: Mr. Show Corporation (Open), Child Labor Writers' Room, Van Hammersly, Gay Son, Major Stockholder Interrupts (Link), Grass Valley Greg, Downsizing, Big Boss (Link), Bhopal / Newsreel, New San Francisco, GVG Cleans, Bhopal (Tag)
9	5	"Operation Hell on Earth"	December 13, 1996	205
Sketches: Young Superstar (Open), Old Folks' Home, Deprivation, Hate Group, News Family Anchors, Recruiters, Blame-A-Thon (Link), Fartin' Gary, Second Wind, Older Superstar (Close)
10	6	"The Velveteen Touch of a Dandy Fop"	December 20, 1996	206
Sketches: Charity / Blind Gary (Open), Subway, Donut Shop, Megaphone Crooners, Greenlight Gang (Movie Execs), Coupon: The Trial, Coupon: The Movie, Credits Testimonials (Close)

=== Season 3 (1997) ===
No. overall	No. in season	Title	Original release date	Prod. code
11	1	"Heaven's Chimney"	September 12, 1997	301
Sketches: Heaven's Chimney (Open), Deprogramming, Heaven Tour, Crazy Religious Beliefs, Watch Us Have Sex, Blatant Sexual Symbolism Montage (Link), The Devastator, Directions, Educational Film Festival (Link), Medieval Science Film, Hail Satan, Cartoon (Cold Tag)
12	2	"Peanut Butter, Eggs, and Dice"	September 19, 1997	302
Sketches: Very Special Episode (Cold Open), David Comes Out As Bald (Open), Ratings Man Song / Map (Link), Santa's Workshop, Tatiana (Hermaphrodite Weathergirl) (Link), Cock Ring Warehouse, Marriage Announcement, Fuzz: The Musical, Terry Gets An Award / Fly By Awards (Link), The Dewey Awards, Bob Lamonta, Handing Out Awards (Close)
13	3	"Oh, You Men"	October 3, 1997	303
Sketches: Banana / Mayor Of Television (Open), Entertainment 4 Every 1, Ventriloquists, People Watching TV / TV Guide (Link), The Hanged Man, DeLongpre Dannon Show, Sticky Pads, Lie Detector, TeeVee TV (Link), Time Caplet, Druggachusettes, Lose The Lost Episode (Close), Monkey / Outer Space (Cold Tag)
14	4	"Flat-Top Tony and the Purple Canoes"	October 10, 1997	304
Sketches: Mr. Show Morning Graphic (Cold Open), Womyn's Solidarity Collective (Open), Black & White Film (Hard Day's Night), VTV (Smoosh, Norma Jean Monster), Break Thru Weekend, Young People & Companions, Newscast Bloopers (Link), Fashion Forecast, Fashion Documentary, Constant Chum High (Link), Indomitable Spirit, Apocalypse Drill, Smoosh On Moon (Cold Tag)
15	5	"Please Don't Kill Me"	October 24, 1997	305
Sketches: Swearing Jar (Open), TV Ministry (Link), Swearing Preacher, Rolling In It / Ferrari Poster (Link), Landlords, Victor & Dylan, Fad Three, Hunger Strike, Mayostard / Mustardayonnaise, Evil Genius Telethon, Mustmayostardayonnaise (Cold Tag)
16	6	"Goin' on a Holiday"	October 31, 1997	306
Sketches: Elderly (Open), Age War, Bills, Bills, Bills! (Link), Our Secret Love, Marriage Photo (Link), Photo Shop, Blowing Up The Moon, Spunk, Don Pratt, SMC / Streakers, Streak Dome '97, Elderly Taking Over (Link), Goin' On A Holiday
17	7	"Bush is a Pussy"	November 7, 1997	307
Sketches: Kedzie Backstage (Cold Open), Kedzie Takes Over (Open), Worthington's Law (Link), Value Magazine, Ranking Monkey (Link), Siamese Twins, Bad News Breakers, Mafia Mathematicians, 24 Is The Highest Number / Marching Band (Link), Philouza, Mediocrity (Close), Dr. Katz (Cold Tag)
18	8	"It's a No-Brainer"	November 14, 1997	308
Sketches: Li'l Devil Knee Socks (Cold Open), Protesters (Open), Protesters, On The Spot News, Lineup Room / VTV (Link), Culture Hunt, Frankly Anne, Europe Maps (Link), Jack Webber, Calendar (Link), Dream Of A Lifetime, Massage Cream Commercial, Anders' Press Conference / Sloppy (Close), Fishing (Cold Tag)
19	9	"A White Man Set Them Free"	November 28, 1997	309
Sketches: Viewer Hate Mail / Cracker Barrel (Open), Bob And David Go To Mail Box, Sarcasmo, Marriage-Con And Boat Show, Map (Link), Biosphere, Humanimal / Ice Cream Flavors (Link), The Last Indian, Vietnam Helicopter (Link), Army Scene, Night Talk With The Senate Subcommittee, All-Star Salute To The Last Indian, Last Indian (Cold Tag)
20	10	"The Return of the Curse of the Creature's Ghost"	December 5, 1997	310
Sketches: Moe Phelps (Open), Gus Kryzinski, Night Janitor, Local World News, Blowjob, Blowjobs (Link), Titannica, Music Video (Link), Pre-Taped Call-In Show, The Return Of The Curse Of The Creature's Ghost, Chip On Your Shoulder Club, Up Your Mother's Ass, Moe Phelps' Play (Close)

=== Season 4 (1998) ===
No. overall	No. in season	Title	Original release date	Prod. code
21	1	"Life is Precious and God and the Bible"	October 26, 1998	401
Sketches: Medical Marijuana (Open), Pharmacy, Electric Underwear (Link), Law School, Apple Butter (Link), Cloning Hitler, Lifeboat, Final Thought (Link), Scams & Flams, Weather (Close)
22	2	"Show Me Your Weenis!"	November 2, 1998	402
Sketches: Rat Pack (Open), Mr. Show Boys' Club, Stealing News, Toenapper News Intro (Link), Toenapper, Underground Tapes, Wyckyd Sceptre, Butt Plugs (Link), Menocu Blind House, Racist In The Year 3000, Benny Hill (Close)
23	3	"Rudy Will Await Your Foundation"	November 9, 1998	403
Sketches: Blooper (Open), Superstar Machine, Phone Sex, Dude's Dude (Link), Audition, Dad & You, Prenatal Pageant, The Burgundy Loaf, Frenchie Delivers (Close)
24	4	"The Story of Everest"	November 16, 1998	404
Sketches: Lethal Logo (Cold Open), Sweetie Pie (Open), Family Of Five (Link), Rapist, Clumsy Waiter, Pallies, Food Ads (Fairsley Foods), Everest, Bumbling Fool (Close), Sweetie Pie (Cold Tag)
25	5	"It's Perfectly Understandishable"	November 23, 1998	405
Sketches: Rehearsal (Open), Those Amazing Actors, Blind Girl, Emergency Psychic Hotline, Dalai Lama, Monk Academy, Chimp (Close)
26	6	"It's Insane, This Guy's Taint"	November 30, 1998	406
Sketches: Dead Crew Guy (Cold Open), Speakers, Blind Date (Link), Intervention, Ka-Ching (Link), Stop, Change Thieves, Men's Club Of Allah (Link), Be Kind, Rewind, The Windbreaker, 'Taint, Dream Weaver (Close)
27	7	"Eat Rotten Fruit from a Shitty Tree"	December 7, 1998	407
Sketches: Water Cooler (Open), Marty Farty, Date With Queen, Spite Marriage, Heaven's Gate (Link), God's Book-On-Tape, Monster Mash, Coffee Hunt (Close)
28	8	"Like Chickens...Delicious Chickens"	December 14, 1998	408
Sketches: Reparations (Open), Mississippi Fun Bucks, Bugged Drug Deal, America's Dumbest Juries (Link), Rich Guy Negative Ads, The Great Hemingway, Most Trusted News Team, Fat Survivor, 2000 lb. Old Man (Link), Civil War Reenactments, Pledge Drive (Close)
29	9	"Sad Songs Are Nature's Onions"	December 21, 1998	409
Sketches: Ratings Child (Open), Debate, Music Offer, Inside The Actor, Lost Inside The Actor, Earth Shoes, Dying Planet (Link), Teardrop Awards, Shrunken Mr. Show (Close)
30	10	"Patriotism, Pepper, and Professionalism"	December 28, 1998	410
Sketches: Resort (Cold Open), Exec (Open), Money Warning, Warnings (Link), Weeklong Romance, Godyssey (Link), Marilyn Monster Pizza Parlours, Info Jimmy, Goodbye, Tombstone / Vendetta (Link), Vendetta, Info Jimmy (Close)

== Production ==
Odenkirk and Cross had both been involved in the sketch show The Ben Stiller Show, with Odenkirk as one of the actors and Cross a writer. The two found a common sense of humor and tried their hand at taking some of the ideas that did not work well on the show to a local comedy club. Their routines were very successful, leading Odenkirk's manager Bernie Brillstein to try to find a means to make them into a television show. HBO had already been scouting the pair, given the two's past roles in other influential comedies, including The Larry Sanders Show, and quickly greenlit the show, providing enough funds for a two-episode order. They managed to stretch the budget of the two-episode order to cover four episodes for the first season.

The show continued for three additional seasons. However, ahead of the fourth season, HBO rescheduled the show into a Monday midnight slot, which made it difficult to find, and resulted in poor ratings, leading HBO to cancel the show after the fourth season.

== Contributors ==
Mr. Show's main cast for the entire run consisted of David Cross, John Ennis, Tom Kenny, Bob Odenkirk, and Jill Talley. Cross, Ennis, and Odenkirk appeared in each season. Kenny left the show after the third season, returning for one episode of season four. Talley appeared in all episodes except for four towards the end of the third season. Jay Johnston, a featured performer throughout the series, was credited as a member of the main cast for the final episode of the show.

=== Main cast ===
- David Cross
- Bob Odenkirk
- John Ennis
- Tom Kenny (seasons 1–3, and episode #402)
- Jill Talley
- Jay Johnston (main season 4, previously featured)

=== Featured cast and frequent collaborators ===
- Scott Adsit (season 4)
- Scott Aukerman (season 2–4)
- Jack Black (seasons 1–2)
- Jay Johnston (seasons 1–4)
- Karen Kilgariff (seasons 3–4)
- Jerry Minor (episode #205, season 4)
- Theresa Mulligan (episode #204, season 3)
- Bill Odenkirk (seasons 1–4)
- Brett Paesel (seasons 2–4)
- B. J. Porter (episodes #205 and #307, season 4)
- Brian Posehn (seasons 1–4)
- Mary Lynn Rajskub (seasons 1–2)
- Mark Rivers (season 4)
- Sarah Silverman (episode #103, season 3)
- Dino Stamatopoulos (seasons 2–4)
- Becky Thyre (season 4)
- Paul F. Tompkins (seasons 1–4)

=== Writing staff ===
- Bob Odenkirk (episode #101–#410)
- David Cross (episode #101–#410)
- Jay Johnston (episode #203–#410)
- Bill Odenkirk (episode #203–#410)
- Dino Stamatopoulos (episode #203, #206–#401, #403–#410)
- Paul F. Tompkins (episode #203–#310)
- Brian Posehn (episode #204–#205, #301–#408)
- Mike Stoyanov (episode #301–#305)
- Mike Upchurch (episode #301–#310)
- Scott Aukerman (episode #401–#410)
- Jerry Collins (episode #401–#407)
- B. J. Porter (episode #401–#410)
- Eric Hoffman (episode #406–#410)

=== Contributing writers ===
- Tom Kenny (episode #308)
- Brent Forrester (episode #308, #404)
- Brian Posehn (episode #410)

== Reception ==
Mr. Show with Bob and David was nominated for a Primetime Emmy Award for Outstanding Writing for a Variety, Music or Comedy Program at the 50th Primetime Emmy Awards, losing to Dennis Miller Live, and also received a nomination for the song "How High The Mountain" in the category of Outstanding Music and Lyrics. The following year it was renominated for Outstanding Writing, losing this time to The Chris Rock Show, and also received a Creative Arts Emmy Award nomination for lighting director Simon Miles.

At the 9th Golden Satellite Awards in 2004, the show's third season DVD set was nominated for "Best DVD Release of TV Shows."

In 2010, prompted by the announcement of IFC's plans to re-air Mr. Show, it was included in a short list of "TV's greatest cult comedy series" by The A.V. Club.

== Related projects ==
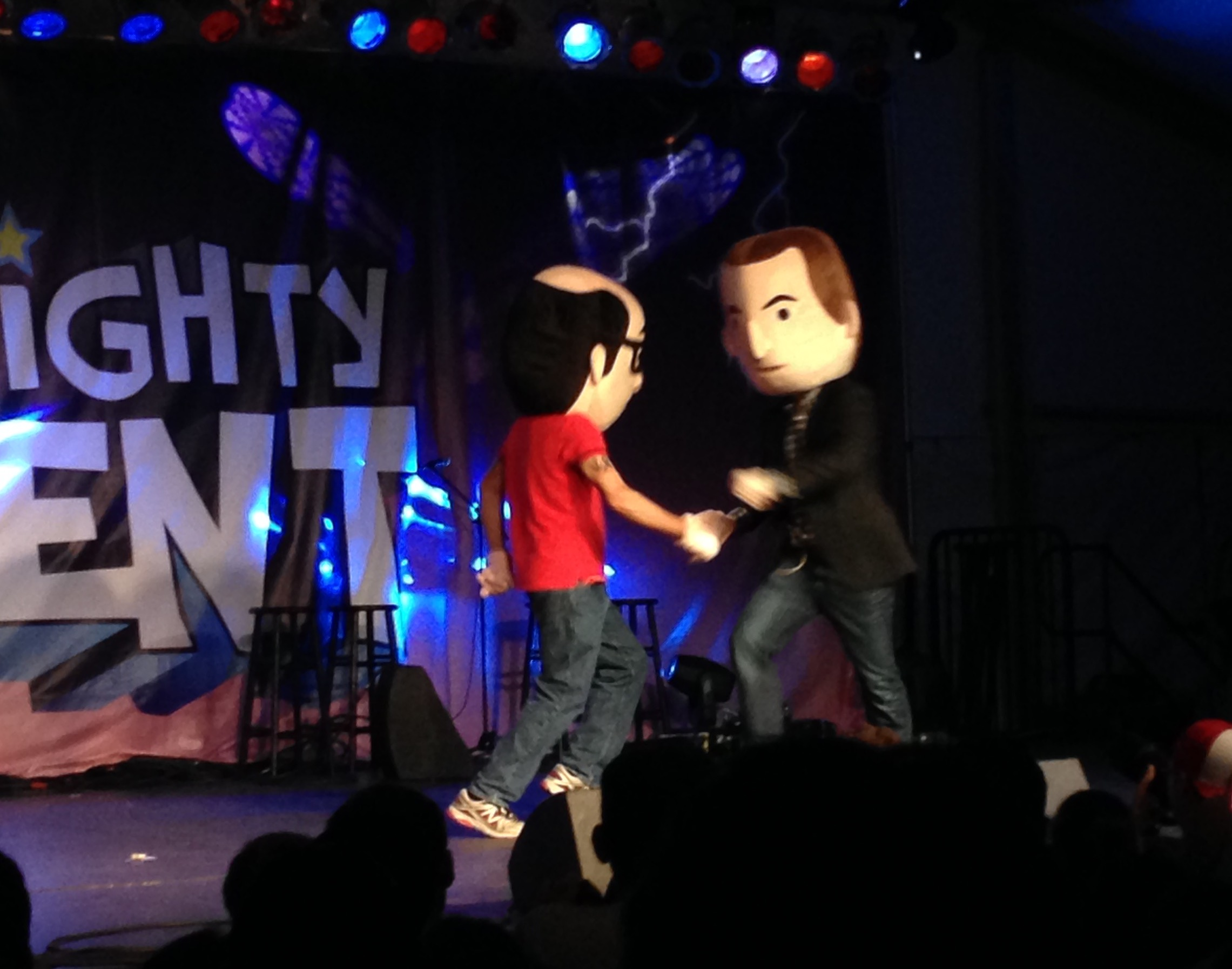
Cross and Odenkirk as themselves, live at Festival Supreme in 2013

=== Run Ronnie Run ===
Mr. Show also spawned a spin-off movie, Run Ronnie Run, which was shown at the 2002 Sundance Film Festival, but went straight-to-DVD. In an April 2004 article in Chunklet magazine, Odenkirk noted numerous problems they had had with the film, blaming the film's director, Troy Miller, who "chose to freeze us out, hold us at arm's length and not let us influence the movie nearly on the scale that we should have."

=== Mr. Show Live: Hooray for America! ===
In September 2002, original cast members Bob Odenkirk, David Cross, John Ennis, Brian Posehn and Stephanie Courtney toured in a show called Mr. Show: Hooray for America!!!. The two-month stint included "distillations" of some of Mr. Show's sketches, such as "The Burgundy Loaf", and new material. In the stage show, the large fictitious mega-corporation Globo-Chem ("We own everything, so you don't have to!") sponsors David's stage persona to run for the presidency of the United States. The tour included 16 large cities and college towns in North America: San Diego, Washington, D.C., Philadelphia, New York City, Boston, Ann Arbor, Chicago, Madison, Minneapolis, Los Angeles, San Francisco, Sacramento, Eugene, Portland, Seattle, and Vancouver.

=== Hollywood Said No! ===
In September 2013, Grand Central Publishing released Hollywood Said No!: Orphaned Film Scripts, Bastard Scenes, and Abandoned Darlings from the Creators of Mr. Show, a book of rejected scripts and unused Mr. Show sketches. The audiobook version included full cast readings by former Mr. Show performers and writers. One of the rejected scripts is the original version of Hooray for America!, which had earlier been adapted as part of the Mr. Show Live tour.

=== Mr. Show Zoomtacular Annual Business Call for Charity ===
During the COVID-19 pandemic in May 2020, Cross, Odenkirk and most of the show's supporting cast including Kenny, Talley, Johnston, Ennis, Aukerman, Posehn, Paesel, Rajskub, and Tompkins, created a Zoom-based streaming Mr. Show reunion event, the Mr. Show Zoomtacular Annual Business Call for Charity, with proceeds benefiting the LIFT charity. The event featured new sketches in the style of Mr. Show, as well as updates from the various cast members on their own current projects, and concluded with the cast and additional friends singing a cover of "Eat It" by "Weird Al" Yankovic, who also participated, that mocked a prior attempt to cover "Imagine" by Gal Gadot and other celebrities performed earlier.

== Legacy ==
Although it was a premium cable broadcast, it has been described as an influential piece of American sketch comedy. Many people involved with the show later worked on other American comedy productions. Several of Odenkirk's co-stars on Mr. Show had prominent roles on his later show Better Call Saul, most notably Michael McKean (Chuck McGill) and John Ennis (Lenny).

The Sarah Silverman Program was written by and stars Sarah Silverman, and features Jay Johnston and Brian Posehn. Arrested Development features David Cross as regular character Tobias Fünke; the series also had guest spots filled by Mr. Show alumni, such as Bob Odenkirk as a marriage counselor, Jerry Minor and Jay Johnston as gay cops, and John Ennis as a mall security guard. Jack Black had supporting roles in Mr. Show. Cross and Odenkirk would go on to work with Black on producing a show for HBO for the comedy band Tenacious D which would also feature Mr. Show alumnus Paul F. Tompkins.

In January 2011, IFC began airing 90-minute blocks of Mr. Show, The Ben Stiller Show, Action and The Larry Sanders Show three times per week. The programming block was often hosted by Mr. Show writer and actor Scott Aukerman, who also conducted new interviews with the shows' contributors and younger comedians who have been influenced by the shows. The song "Adam's Song" by American pop punk band Blink-182 got its name as a tribute/reference to a sketch from the show about a band that writes a song by the same name with similar lyrical content. This was confirmed by Cross in an interview, who said "They were fans of the show and that was a knowing tribute that I thought was pretty cool."

=== David's Situation ===
Odenkirk and Cross reunited in 2008 to create the HBO pilot David's Situation, which was shot but never aired. The network gave the pair $400,000 to shoot a pilot (which was shot on the Everybody Loves Raymond soundstage), which appeared to go well during the taping; however, while Cross and Odenkirk were editing the episode, they felt it failed to "capture that same energy on screen." In an interview with Vanity Fair, Cross said, "We told them that we didn't want to do this show, we'd rather do Mr. Show 2.0. And they were like, 'Yeah, O.K., that's great, but the thing is, we don't have any more money for this year. But we'll figure out something next year.' And we never heard from them again."

=== Comedians and shows inspired by Mr. Show ===
Comedy duo Tim & Eric have said their program Tim and Eric Awesome Show, Great Job! was highly inspired by Mr. Show. Odenkirk served as the producer on Awesome Show as well as Tom Goes to the Mayor and The Birthday Boys.

Other sketch comedy shows whose creators have cited Mr. Show as an influence include Portlandia, Key & Peele, Kroll Show, The Whitest Kids U' Know, People's Emergency Guide and Human Giant. After winning a Golden Globe for Abbott Elementary, creator/star Quinta Brunson named Mr. Show as an inspiration and personally thanked fellow nominee Bob Odenkirk.

== Revival ==
In April 2015, Netflix acquired Mr. Show and put in an order for four half-hour episodes and one hour-long "making-of" special. The announcement was a followup to a Twitter post from Paul F. Tompkins teasing about "something new coming from the Mr. Show gang in the new year." W/ Bob & David premiered on November 13, 2015.

== Characters ==
Odenkirk and Cross mostly avoided using recurring characters a la Saturday Night Live, but some characters made repeat appearances:

Character	Actor	Description
Ronnie Dobbs	David Cross	A white trash habitual petty criminal, regularly caught in the act on Fuzz, a COPS-like program. Known for the catchphrases "Y'all are brutalizing me" and "Let's have us a champagne jam!". Sketch also launched Maynard James Keenan's band Puscifer.
Grass Valley Greg	David Cross	An eccentric billionaire computer genius who invented the delete key, loves vegan sweets and retarded goats.
Dylan	David Cross	A pretentious man clad in a long scarf, even in hot weather, and friend of Droopy. He shuns popular American culture and modern technology.
Terry Twillstein	Bob Odenkirk	British television producer who discovers Ronnie Dobbs and tries to utilize him in a West End-like fashion.
Sen. Howell Tankerbell	Bob Odenkirk	An ultra-conservative Georgia Dixiecrat Senator
Blueberry Head	David Cross	A blue-haired comedian who serves as a parody of Carrot Top known for his use of nonsensical props
Fancy Pants	Bill Odenkirk	A dandy who makes occasional silent, walk-ons. First seen clad in Edwardian garb he makes his second appearance in a more Elizabethan style.
Droopy	Bob Odenkirk	A thirty-something slacker. He wants to work at a local museum, though he has few qualifications. He never went by any name during the show.
Three Times One Minus One	David Cross and Bob Odenkirk	An R&B duo from Scarsdale made up of Pootie T. (Cross) and Wolfgang Amadeus Thelonius Von Funkenmeister the XIX 3/4 (Odenkirk). They are sponsored by The WPCBCN ("White People Co-opting Black Culture Network").
Kedzie Matthews	Tom Kenny	A hyperactive comedian whose humor is overblown.
Famous Mortimer	Patton Oswalt	A director known for his documentary "Naked Ambition" and "Coupon: The Movie." Son of, among others, recently divorced newscast members.
