= Brand X with Russell Brand =

- Genre: Comedy; Satire
- Created by: Russell Brand; Troy Miller
- Written by: Russell Brand; Mason Steinberg; Fred Belford; Jeff Cesario
- Directed by: Troy Miller
- Starring: Russell Brand; Matt Stoller (season 1); Steve Jones (season 2)
- Theme music composer: Slash (season 1)
- Country of origin: United States
- Original language: English
- No. of seasons: 2
- No. of episodes: 26

Production
- Executive producers: Russell Brand; Troy Miller; Nik Linnen; John Noel
- Producers: Matt Magielnicki; A J Diantonio
- Production location: various
- Editors: George Danno; Seth Clark; Kabir Akhtar; Noah Rosenstein
- Running time: 22 minutes (Season 1); 44 mins (Season 2)
- Production companies: Branded Films; Dakota Films; FX Productions

Original release
- Network: FX
- Release: June 28, 2012 – May 2, 2013

Brand X with Russell Brand is an American late-night talk show, stand up comedy television series that premiered on FX on June 28, 2012, starring English comedian Russell Brand and created by Brand and Troy Miller. Its second season concluded on May 2, 2013. On June 6, 2013, FX announced that Brand X would not be renewed for a third season.

== Production ==
=== Season 1 ===
For the first half of season 1 (2012), there weren't any guests, just an extended monologue with three loosely connected topics. Brand was accompanied on stage by his political analyst Matt Stoller in season 1. In later episodes, a celebrity guest appeared for two segments, the first of which was an interview and the second of which was Brand and the guest giving an audience member advice about a problem they asked about. In the second half of season 1, Brand added the segment "Totally Unacceptable Opinion", which featured people from hate groups such as the Westboro Baptist Church, and Brand argued with them about their controversial beliefs, then brought out some of the types of people whom they hate (for example, a group of homosexuals) for a debate.

=== Season 2 ===
FX renewed the series on November 27 for a 13-episode second season, which began on February 7, 2013 and expanded to an hour-long format broadcast live. The "Totally Unacceptable Opinion" segment was dropped and Stoller was effectively replaced as sideman by Steve Jones, founding member and guitarist of the Sex Pistols. In addition to providing brief guitar accompaniment leading into and out of commercial breaks, Jonesy's punk credentials and congenial on-air manner from years as Los Angeles Indie 103 radio DJ/host proved a far better fit for occasional banter with fellow Brit Brand.

=== Cancellation ===
On June 6, 2013, FX announced that Brand X with Russell Brand would not be renewed for a third season. FX reportedly picked up a scripted pilot starring Brand that would be loosely based on his life, similar to Curb Your Enthusiasm.

== Reception ==
The first episode gained largely negative reviews, with Mary McNamara of the Los Angeles Times commenting that, "If nothing else, Brand has overestimated his own ability to riff on the news, or rather the audience's interest in his riff. More experienced "talk show" stars, from Leno to Colbert, approach the half-hour with a bit more humility; they do not try to sustain it with monologue alone."

Tim Goodman of The Hollywood Reporter was more positive, although he found that the half-hour-long time slot was "constraining". According to Goodman, Brand X is "ostensibly an exercise in Brand riffing on the news" and is considered to be an attempt by Brand to bring his stand up comedy roots to a U.S. audience.
