= Brett Paesel =

American actress and author

Brett Paesel is an American actress and author. She is married with two children. She played in Top Girls, and was a recurring cast member in Amazon Studios’ Transparent. She was also a recurring cast member on Mr. Show with Bob and David, and appeared in Season 2, Episode 8 of Curb Your Enthusiasm (2001).

Her 2006 book Mommies Who Drink: Sex, Drugs, and Other Distant Memories of an Ordinary Mom, is a polemic against modern mothering. She also contributes to The New York Times.

== Bibliography ==
- Mommies Who Drink: Sex, Drugs, and Other Distant Memories of an Ordinary Mom, Warner Books (2006) ISBN 0-446-57873-8
