= Fetishization of LGBTQ people =

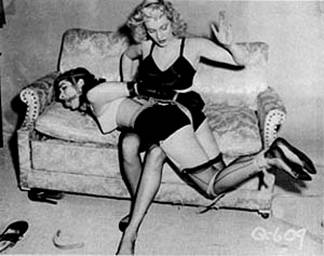
Magazine photograph of women performing sadomasochism (1946–1959)

Fetishization of LGBTQ people occurs when lesbian, gay, bisexual, transgender, or otherwise queer people are seen as attractive solely for their identity, relationship structures, or body parts to the point they are reduced to these attributes. Fetishization can take the form of sexualization and objectification. It can manifest in several ways such as stereotypes, asking intrusive questions about one's genitals or sex life, or using the person being fetishized to fulfill sexual fantasies. Fetishization of LGBTQ people is found in pornography, fandoms, and mainstream media.

== Scope ==
Fetishization of LGBTQ people is different from someone being attracted to an LGBTQ person. Fetishization occurs when an LGBTQ person is reduced to their identity, relationship structures, or body parts. These attributes are what are perceived as attractive, not one's personal qualities. For instance, fetishization of transgender women is when they are seen as overvalued sex objects due their trans status or body rather than as holistic individuals.

While views on fetishization vary, it is often conceived as a form of objectification and sexualization. Sexualization occurs in the form of being reduced to ones' body parts or sexual function. Objectification is viewing someone as an object to satisfy a personal desire in manner which denies the objectified person's dignity; it can be a form of dehumanization. When viewed more broadly, fetishization can be seen as both "form of sexual objectification and as a construct that refers to sexual desire and attraction."

The marginalization of people with certain characteristics, such as being LGBTQ, contributes to fetishization. When a majority of the population views a marginalized group as not sexually attractive, it can draw the attention of fetishists. Fetishists are not people who are attracted to someone of a marginalized group because they acknowledged and moved past the societal bias against that group, rather, they are specifically drawn to the group because of their marginalization; they enjoy the thrill of sex outside of accepted norms. For fetishes towards objects, clothing, etc this is not typically harmful; however, there are several potential relationship issues between a fetishist and the partner whom they are fetishizing for their marginalized identity. Those who fetishize marginalized groups often rely on seeing that group as strange, ugly, or inferior since that is what provides the fetish's perceived thrill of being outside of sexual norms. If the partner from the marginalized group does not know they are being fetishized, they cannot consent to participating in their partner's kink.

== Manifestations ==
Fetishization can manifest in a variety of ways. Some examples include asking invasive questions about one's genitals, asking for details about one's sex life, or using the person to satisfy one's sexual fantasy. Transgender, lesbian, and bisexual women are especially vulnerable to receiving unwanted sexual solicitation, sexual jokes, verbal sexual harassment, and non-consensual genital touching. Fetishization can be experienced in person during both romantic and non-romantic interactions. Most fetishization experienced by LGBTQ+ people occurs online via dating apps or social media.

=== Fetishization of sexual minorities ===
WLW (women loving women) are viewed as erotic by some heterosexual men. Fetishization of sapphic women can manifest through voyeuristic behaviors such as asking women to kiss, watching women kiss at parties, and reacting to women kissing by commenting on how attractive it is. When lesbians or bisexual women are seen kissing, it is sometimes assumed to be an attempt to appeal to the male gaze. Some men flirt with lesbians, believing they can make them become heterosexual.

Bisexual women are stereotyped as inherently hypersexual. Bisexual women face additional fetishization compared to lesbians; due to not being monosexual they are solicited for threesomes with heterosexual couples. Some bisexual women describe being solicited for sex by couples to be treated as a sexual object rather than an individual. During a study interview, one bisexual participant described that "[heterosexual couples] don't want to date you independently, they want you to come and be a part of their couple ... usually they want someone to come be a [sexual] play thing ... they can use until they are done and toss [her] away." Bisexual women have been perceived by other women as predatory or had their sexuality viewed as an experiment.

The fetishization of men in general by some gay men (i.e. believing every man is at least somewhat gay) is form of erasure for bisexual men by framing bisexual behavior as hiding homosexuality. Like bisexual women, bisexual men are assumed to be hypersexual due to not being monosexual. Racial stereotypes can intersect with fetishization. Asian queer men are seen as feminine and therefore bottoms (the partner being penetrated during sex), and black queer men are seen as masculine and therefore tops (the partners who penetrate).

=== Fetishization of transgender people ===
Transgender people are sometimes fetishized by chasers, slang for cisgender people who sexualize transgender people due to their transgender identity. The term typically refers to cisgender men who fetishize transgender women; however, cisgender women can be chasers too. Non-binary people and transgender men also experience fetishization. In a survey of 316 transgender and non-binary people, 63 percent experienced fetishization.

Some chasers are attracted to transmasculine people during their transition since they are perceived as looking prepubescent. Others find transmasculine people attractive sexually but disposable romantically. Some men who identify as heterosexual fetishize transgender men, seeing them as a way to have sex with a man without going against their heterosexual identity. Transgender men are also fetishized as a means for men to fulfill their fantasy of having sex with a lesbian. Some cisgender lesbians fetishize trans men who do not pass as cisgender men and view them as lesbians. Some cisgender women will say they do not date men while dating a transgender man, invalidating their gender identity. Non-binary people assigned female at birth can be misgendered as women when being sexually objectified.

Transgender women are stereotyped by some as hypersexual while transgender men are stereotyped as being less sexual. Transgender people are stereotyped as being into kink. Harmful misconceptions like transgender women having autogynephilia frame transgender people as fetishists. Julia Serano, author of Whipping Girl, says that transgender women are sexualized because the purpose of transition is assumed to be increasing their attraction to heterosexual men. In this view, forms of gender affirmation like vaginoplasty are seen as for heterosexual men's pleasure. Cisgender men's curiosity and interest towards transfeminine bodies can lead to objectification. Transgender women have been treated as sexual objects by being pursued to fulfill sexual fantasies rather than to form meaningful relationships with.

Chasers often lack interest in a transgender woman's personal interests. They may readily ask intrusive questions asking a trans woman about their genitals or if they are receiving hormone replacement therapy. They tend to target transgender women who have not undergone vaginoplasty and still have a penis. Online chaser spaces view transgender women a combination of male and female elements. Chasers stereotype transgender women as hyper-feminine and transgender men as gentle and compassionate. Chasers may intensely compliment the appearance of transmasculine or transfeminine people who are insecure about their appearance. This can be done genuinely or be done to earn the person's trust.

Some online communities use transgender people's social media profiles for fetish mining, the act of using images that are not intended to be sexual as fetish material without the creator's consent. Those with a femboy (feminine male) fetish may seek out pictures of transmasculine and transfeminine people, especially those early into medical transition with an androgynous appearance. These images are shared onto accounts dedicated to sharing fetish material.

=== Fetishization of intersex people ===
Curiosity about intersex bodies can lead those interested into dehumanizing the intersex person. According to intersex activist Morgan Holmes, intersex people are often fetishized within feminist and queer spaces. The differences caused by their intersex variation are seen as extreme and othering. Intersex people are therefore seen as having an innate responsibility to challenge sex and gender norms. This treats the experiences of intersex people as homogeneous.

== In media and fandom ==
=== Men loving men ===
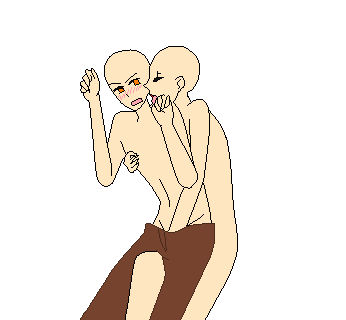
Generic base for boys' love art. One's preferred characters are drawn over the base.

Fandom shipping communities tend to predominantly consist of heterosexual women. Fandom spaces often ship male characters together even if the characters are established to be heterosexual. While not all fan works are sexual, some fan-made shipping content can be graphically sexual or include potentially disturbing themes such as abuse or incest. Sex scenes in fan works often portray gay sex inaccurately. Fandom works can reinforce stereotypes or heteronormative relationship roles. For instance, a common trope is to have one man in a gay relationship have more masculine features, like being tall and muscular, and for the other man to have feminine features like being short or having wide hips. Some fans view slash, or fan fiction of non-canon male-male couples, as a means to subvert of the heteronormative canon of the original media.

Boys' love, or BL, is a genre focused on portraying romantic and sexual gay relationships which is also prone to fetishization. The genre was originally created by Japanese women as a form of escapism from societal sexism. It is often written by heterosexual women for an audience of heterosexual teenage girls, though it has queer fans as well. The genre frequently uses heteronormative roles with a masculine and sexually dominant partner, the seme, and the submissive and feminine partner, the uke. Some BL media uses tropes such as non-consensual relationships, unhealthy power imbalances like teacher-student relationships, and pedophilia. A subgenre known as shotacon includes sexual relationships between two prepubescent boys or a boy and an adult man. Both boys' love and fandom content are typically seen as inaccurate representations of gay relationships. However, some queer fans enjoy how the BL genre tends to focus on the emotional aspect of the romance like heterosexual romance and are not particularly concerned about the work being realistic.

Heterosexual women who are fans of gay romance often use the genre to avoid the objectification of women often found in male-female romance. As written by sex therapist Matt Lachman, "Women can explore intense passion on the page or watching a show/movie without having to translate it into real world expectations placed on their own body." Gay pornography also draws female audiences since it focuses on the male body while heterosexual porn often focuses on the female participant's body. Gay romance author Lucy Lennox says she feels that romance between men allows her to avoid power dynamics such as dominant men or the damsel in distress trope. Because the genre's audience and writers are predominantly female, gay male writers are often paid less for their contributions.

Gay romances are mainly created by women and are often not realistic. More difficult experiences in gay people's lives like homophobia and self-doubt are often excluded to create an ideal fantasy for readers. Gay pornography websites often use hyper-masculine terms like "hunk" and "domination" which can objectify queer men as well as narrowly frame and exaggerate queer men's sex roles.

=== Women loving women ===
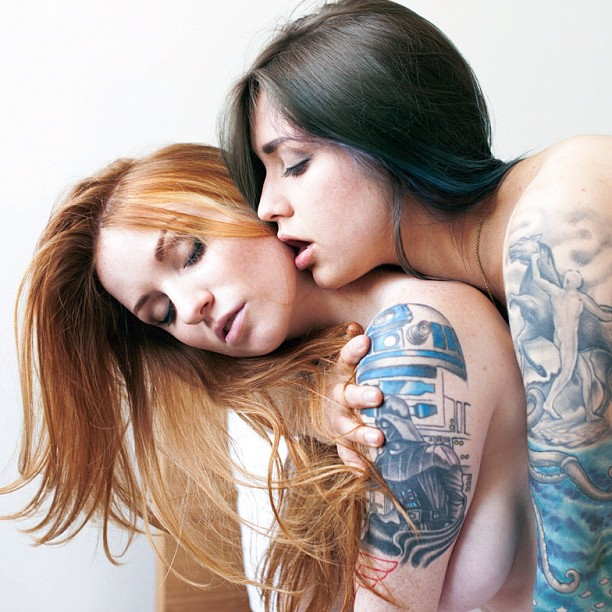
SuicideGirls Kemper Fidelis and Venom Blackbird posing together for a pin-up

During the Cold War, the United States was very conservative and ideas that seemed contrary to the nuclear family were demonized. This included gay men and lesbian women. In the 1950s, lesbians became viewed as sick rather than dangerous, and with the potential to be cured if with the right man. Lesbians were seen as a sexual test for heterosexual men. Pulp fiction novels began including themes like lesbian orgies and threesomes. In the 1950s and 60s, men's magazines began running stories and including images of two women wanting a man.

Intimacy between women is used in mainstream media and pornography for heterosexual male audiences. Pornography often features plot lines of lesbians seducing or being seduced by a man. Scenes in mainstream media appeal to the male gaze by having the camera hover over female characters during sapphic sex scenes to keep the focus on their bodies. Another method is having women pose suggestively together. For instance, in the music video for "Can't Remember to Forget You", Rihanna and Shakira caress each other while staring into the camera. Films featuring lesbian couples may put a lot of detail into their sexual interactions while putting little attention on the mental or emotional elements of their relationship.

Sapphic pornography aimed at a heterosexual male audience (girl-girl porn) is often criticized as inauthentic. Many actors and directors of queer porn also create girl-girl porn, causing an overlap in production cultures. Feminist Theory professor Clare Hemmings says that because femininity and desire for men are culturally perceived as linked with one another, femme-presenting people are perceived as subjects in the process of heterosexual object-choice (directing their libido or mental energy towards the heterosexuality.) It is also difficult to discern authenticity on the basis of what sex acts actors are willing to perform on and off camera since sex in it of itself can be viewed as performative. As Jennifer Moorman describes in her study on bisexuality in pornography, girl-girl porn can be "both heterosexist and queer, both performative and authentic, both problematic and potentially liberatory."

=== Transgender people ===
In American erotica from the late 1960s to the early 1980s, transgender women and cross-dressing men were often expected to adhere to the desires of normative sexuality. Other types of fetishes were rarely involved in published material. Despite this, magazines featuring transgender women or male cross-dressers would be sold alongside fetishes perceived as more hardcore such as pregnancy fetishes or BDSM.

Models were expected to keep a strictly feminine and hairless appearance during this time period. To exoticize the models, magazines would often juxtapose their masculine and feminine elements. This would include photo essays showing the model in masculine clothes or getting ready for a photoshoot to provide a before and after comparison between the masculine and feminine appearance. The penises of transgender women and drag queens would be emphasized through close up shots or by being placed in the center of the image. This was to portray the models as an idealized combination between a man and a woman.

Pornography of transgender women remains focused on the performer's penis. While pornography of transgender men is less common, it also frequently emphasizes the genitals of the actor's birth sex. Transgender people continue to be stereotyped as an ideal combination of both male and female.

Pornography of transgender people continues to be popular. In 2025, the Pornhub category "transgender" was sixth most popular category for men and fifth most popular category for women. It is unknown whether the category's increase in popularity is out of curiosity or fetishization. Russia, a country with no legal protections for transgender people, saw the highest increase in the popularity of transgender pornography that year. Website names, video titles, and search terms for transgender pornography often include derogatory terms like tranny and shemale.

=== Intersex people ===
Intersex people have been subjects of marginalization and fascination in Japanese culture. Futanari, now a term for hentai of people with male and female characteristics, began as a term to describe intersex shamans during the Heian period. Risque works went on to feature intersex protagonists. For instance, several of erotic author Jun'ichirō Tanizaki's early works included protagonists that were in some ways both male and female; they were used as a form of spectacle. Futanari hentai greatly increased in popularity in the 1990s. Though the genre's subjects are intersex or transgender, futanari do not possess real physical traits of these people. Futanari characters often have large penises capabile of ejaculation, a vagina, and a uterus capable of becoming pregnant. Those with a futanari fetish tend to react to real intersex bodies with disgust.

== Impact ==
=== Pornography ===
Because most sapphic erotic content is aimed towards heterosexual men, it can be difficult for lesbian and bisexual women to create content that they feel better represents them. Non-binary people have difficulty finding erotic media featuring other non-binary people since most transgender pornography is of binary transgender people, mainly transgender women.

Some teens and young adults use pornography as a source of sex education. As a result, pornography can give viewers misconceptions about queer relationships. Gay porn frequently includes sex without a condom which can promote unprotected sex. Acts performed in gay pornography are often physically unrealistic. Viewers may adopt porn stereotypes into their sex lives. While heterosexual porn is also often unrealistic, same-sex porn can end up reaching vulnerable audiences such as queer youth without access to inclusive sex education. As Kieran Galpin wrote in the Huffington Post, "Gay porn is, in my experience, just as problematic as the majority of straight porn, yet its audience is likely more vulnerable and curious about their emerging sexuality."

Some queer people find mainstream pornography beneficial despite the common use of exaggeration and potential fetishization. In a study of three hundred LGBTQ+ people from 55 countries almost 90 percent of the non-heterosexual respondents learned directly from online pornography (both mainstream and queer aimed). 57 percent found it useful for their sex lives. Some respondents noted pornography helped them discover their sexuality. Pornography served as a source of information for those who lacked access to inclusive LGBTQ sex education. In some conservative countries, LGBTQ people are rarely discussed. More progressive sex education curriculums do not discuss the mechanics of same-sex sexual activities, causing LGBTQ youth to lack access to practical guidance outside of pornography.

Transgender people's view of their representation in pornography is mixed. Some transgender people find it normalizing, attractive, and enjoy exploring the ways people's bodies can look after gender-affirming care. However, the frequent invalidation of the actor's gender, objectification, and emphasis on the actor's genitals elicit negative reactions.

Pornography created by artificial intelligence (AI) can exaggerate stereotypes of LGBTQ people in porn. Femboys are commonly searched for in gay porn, and AI can exaggerate the thin body type associated with femboys to the point they appear emaciated. A common body type in lesbian porn with a thin waist and large breasts and butt can also be exaggerated with AI to the point of impossibility. AI porn exaggerates trans women to be hyper-feminine while also having impossibly large penises. With AI porn, it can be difficult to determine who generated a work and why. It can also create ethical concerns if child pornography was used in the training data.

=== Mental and emotional effects ===
Fetishization is largely seen as harmful by members of the LGBTQ community. Across LGBTQ identities, fetishization elicits emotions of anxiety, depression, and disgust. Some bisexual women reported feeling simultaneously flattered and uneasy. Transgender people tend to experience reduced self-value, depersonalization, loneliness, and invalidation of their identities. Transgender people and queer women reported feelings of suicidal ideation and suicide attempts. Non-binary people report maladaptive coping mechanisms such as substance use and over-eating. Experiencing fetishization is a significant predictor of feeling more internalized transphobia. The effects of fetishization vary based on consent and if the recipient enjoys sexualization. Lesbians who enjoy sexualization experience less negative effects, such as body shame and depression, compared to those who do not.

Fetishization can impact one's relationship with oneself and others. Sexual minority men, women, and gender non-conforming people can internalize objectification based on their LGBTQ identities, leading to self-objectification. Sexual minority women tend to experience stronger internalization of societal beauty standards after objectification. Transgender people can end up blaming themselves for the fetishization they experience. Fetishization can contribute to feeling gender affirmation or gender dysphoria depending on if it aligns with transgender person's perception of their body. LGBTQ people who experience fetishization may become hypervigilant or develop severe distrust. Some transgender people and bisexual women have gone on to form bonds with other femme and queer people over shared experiences of objectification.

Some transgender people feel sexually objectified and dehumanized by fetishization. Other transgender people have positive experiences of fetishization, such as liking additional sexual attention or initially being desired for fetishization reasons but also being appreciated on a personal level. Others have ambiguous experiences such as disliking fetishization but preferring it to more overt or violent transphobia. As one trans man study participant commented on the dichotomy between the positive experience of attention coinciding with the negative experience of fetishization, saying that "someone is interested in me and I usually feel good and wanted, until they make a comment about me that I do not like- they like boycunt or FTMs or they think I'm the best of both worlds or whatever. Then I realize they're fetishizing me and I feel gross."

Fetishization of intersex people is a contributing factor to minority stress and puts intersex people at risk of sexual violence. People fetishize intersex bodies as having complete male and complete female genitals. When they realize this is not the case, fetishists often react with disgust. This can confirm an intersex person's fear that their body will be met with revulsion. Fetishization contributes to feeling of isolation and loneliness.

=== Inappropriate behaviors and safety risks ===
Fetishization of LGBTQ people can lead some people to perform inappropriate or harassing behavior. For instance, some fans of the boys' love genre go on to make fetishizing remarks to real men. This can include sexual comments online aimed towards BL actors, comparing men on social media to BL characters, or assuming men performing together on social media are in a relationship. Since many BL fans are teen and preteen girls, they may fail to understand that these actions are not appropriate.

Queer female refugees from Syria described how fetishization and objectification impacted them. Since there is no visible indicator of one's sexuality, some asylum officials use stereotypes as proof of their sexualities. Case workers may further try to determine a queer female refugee's sexuality with invasive questions about sex, her relationships, and her personal life. This form of marginalization can elicit feelings of isolation, depression, and anxiety.

Fetishization can pose a safety risk to LGBTQ people. Sexual minority people and transgender women reported experiences linking exoticization and sexual violence. This can lead a transgender person to fear and avoid situations in which they may be sexualized. Transgender people often experience microaggressions when seeking relationships such as misgendering or reducing their gender to what genitals they have. Chasers may attack or insult transgender people who do not have sex with them. For example, Jade Careaga, a transgender woman and sex worker, encountered a client who was interested in her because she was trans, but she canceled her date with him after he damaged her porch. He attacked her and left her unconscious in the street.

Transgender people also experience fear using or meeting someone they met on a dating app due anecdotes of transphobic violence. Out of 142 transgender and non-binary respondents, over half report being fetishized on dating apps. They can receive objectifying messages, insults, or threats. For example, one transgender man interviewed in a study recounts that a Bumble user asked about his genitals. When he declined to answer, the user sent him the address of the residence he had just moved out of.

== See also ==
- Attraction to transgender people – Attraction on the basis of sexual desire towards transgender individuals
- Bisexual pornography – Pornography depicting bisexuality
- Femboy § Usage
- Homonormativity – Application of heterosexual norms to LGBTQ culture
- Non-LGBTQ patronage of LGBTQ venues
- Racism in the LGBTQ community § Sexual racism against East and Southeast Asians
- LGBTQ stereotypes – Stereotypes around LGBTQ people and communities
- Shipping ethics controversy in fanfiction – Debate over romantic and sexual content in fanfiction
- Unicorn hunting – Seeking of a third partner by a couple
