= Hunnypaint =

Hunnypaint is a Canadian adult-content creation duo. Their work features femboy presentation.

== Career ==
In Pornhub's 2024 year-end ranking of gay performers, Hunnypaint placed third. PinkNews reported that this was the duo's first appearance on the annual list. They placed seventh in 2025.

At the 2025 Pornhub Awards, Hunnypaint won the award for Top Twink Performer.

== Public commentary ==
In comments included in Pornhub's 2025 annual report, Hunnypaint discussed the growing popularity of femboy content. They described femboy presentation as an expression of femininity that does not necessarily determine a person's gender identity. They also said that some fans identified as heterosexual, attributing their interest to perceived femininity rather than gender identity.
