= Attraction to transgender people =

Attraction on the basis of sexual desire towards transgender individuals

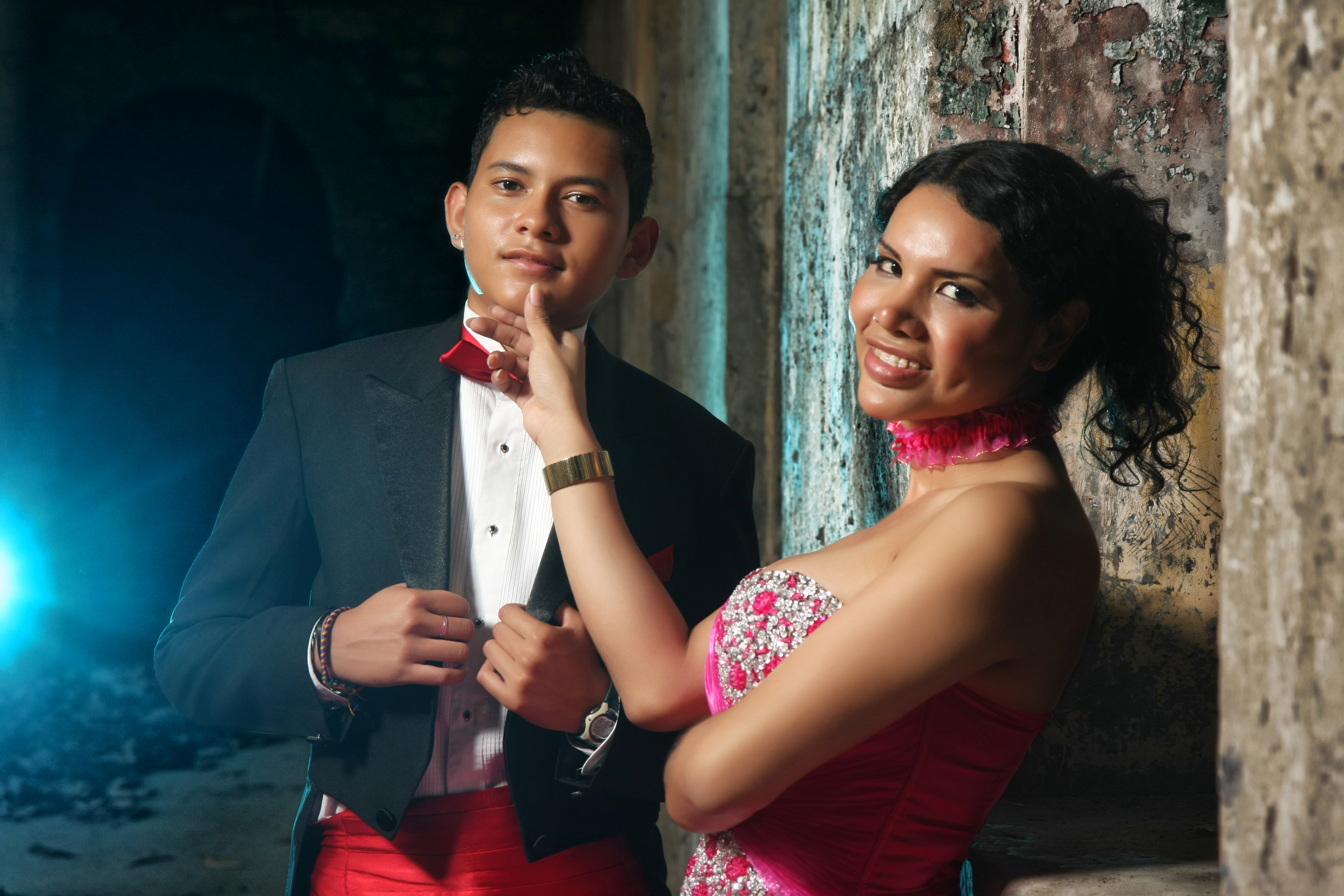
Ecuadorian politician Diane Rodríguez, a trans woman (right), with her partner, Nicolás Guamanquispe, a trans man (left), 2014

Attraction to transgender people has been the subject of scientific study and social commentary. Psychologists have researched sexual attraction toward trans women, trans men, cross dressers, non-binary people, and a combination of these. Publications in the field of transgender studies have investigated the attraction transgender individuals can feel for each other. The people who feel this attraction to transgender people name their attraction in different ways.

Cisgender men attracted to transgender women primarily have a sexual identity that is heterosexual if they are exclusively gynephilic (meaning "attraction to women and/or femininity"). Others may instead have a bisexual or pansexual identity, or may regard their attraction as a distinct sexual orientation. Transgender individuals often call their attraction to other transgender people T4T and may sometimes consider it a sexual identity and/or a form of political identity.

== From cisgender people ==
=== Overall ===
In a 2018 study by Kinsey Institute fellow Justin Lehmiller of 4,175 Americans' sexual fantasies, he found that "about one in three men and one in four women" reported they had "fantasized about sex with a transsexual partner."

A 2019 study asked 958 online participants, mostly young adults in Canada and the United States, which gender identities they would be interested in dating. In the sample, 3.3% of heterosexual men, 1.8% of heterosexual women, 11.5% of gay men, 28.8% of lesbian women, and 51.7% of bisexual, queer, and non-binary people (grouped together for analysis) reported they would be interested in dating a transgender person, and the remainder were not interested. In contrast, a 2025 vignette study found that heterosexual women reacted more positively to an other-gender trans person making flirtatious advances, compared to how positively that heterosexual men reacted to this scenario on average.

Some commentators have discussed romantic or sexual attraction towards trans people as portrayed in media, such as in film or television series. The HBO drama series, Euphoria (2019), was one prominent example, and depicted the romantic relationships of Jules Vaughn, a trans femme character. Vaughn, portrayed by Hunter Schafer, had relationships with both men and women, including the main character, Rue Bennett. IndieWire said the series had a "trans-amorous gaze". Zackary Drucker praised Euphoria as the result of trans creators' grassroots campaigns for film and television to create "more complex representations of trans people … 'Euphoria' is a measure of our progress and a successful outcome deserving of celebration."

As representation and awareness about attraction to trans people as portrayed in other genres of media have been described, so has the relevance of transgender erotica. Some people have "discovered … attraction to trans women through pornography." Worldwide viewership for transgender erotica began to grow significantly in the 1990s, sometimes credited to the introduction of personal computers and the World Wide Web, thus enabling the sharing of media. This growth in viewership has continued since, with some studios "dedicated specifically to trans porn, in addition to independent and amateur productions". However, this genre existed prior to the 1990s, emerging at least by the 1960s. At that time, "an increasingly unapologetic generation of trans people … began to consciously reject the middle-class politics of respectability of Christine Jorgensen and prior generations". It is reported there is a hinted demand for "enduring centrality of the erect penis in trans porn", however, some trans women in the genre "have a successful career post-GCS"; actresses such as Ajita Wilson and Jill Monro appeared in films after GCS as early as the 1970s and 1980s. Trans men have also been portrayed in the genre, including in its earlier years as pioneered by "independent, small studios … situated within the broader lesbian, queer, and trans porn scene in the Bay Area, dating back to On Our Backs and Fatale Video in the 1980s".

Some commentary criticizes trans-focused erotica that contains "fetishization", "oversexualization", and similar themes. In a 2021 article by Internet Group, clinician Adilon Harley referenced the relatively high viewership of transgender-focused erotic content in Brazil, only lower than in Argentina. Relating it to trans people's experiences in Brazil's context, Harley said, "due to prejudice, [they] may have their body restricted to hidden desire, in which sex will only be carried out anonymously, in a fetishized way. A body as an object of the repressed and unprocessed desires of the other person, and exempt from the possibility of growing in the relationship and feeling." Most of the 142 transgender and non-binary people, in a 2021 survey providing a spectrum of responses, described fetishization in this regard as "a negative experience of sexual objectification", particularly when it crosses "the line between attraction and fetish". (See: § Terminology.)

In a 2024 review article, it was found the "largest consumers of pornography featuring trans women are heterosexual cisgender men. In contrast, with regard to porn featuring trans men as protagonists, the largest consumers are cisgender women and gay men."

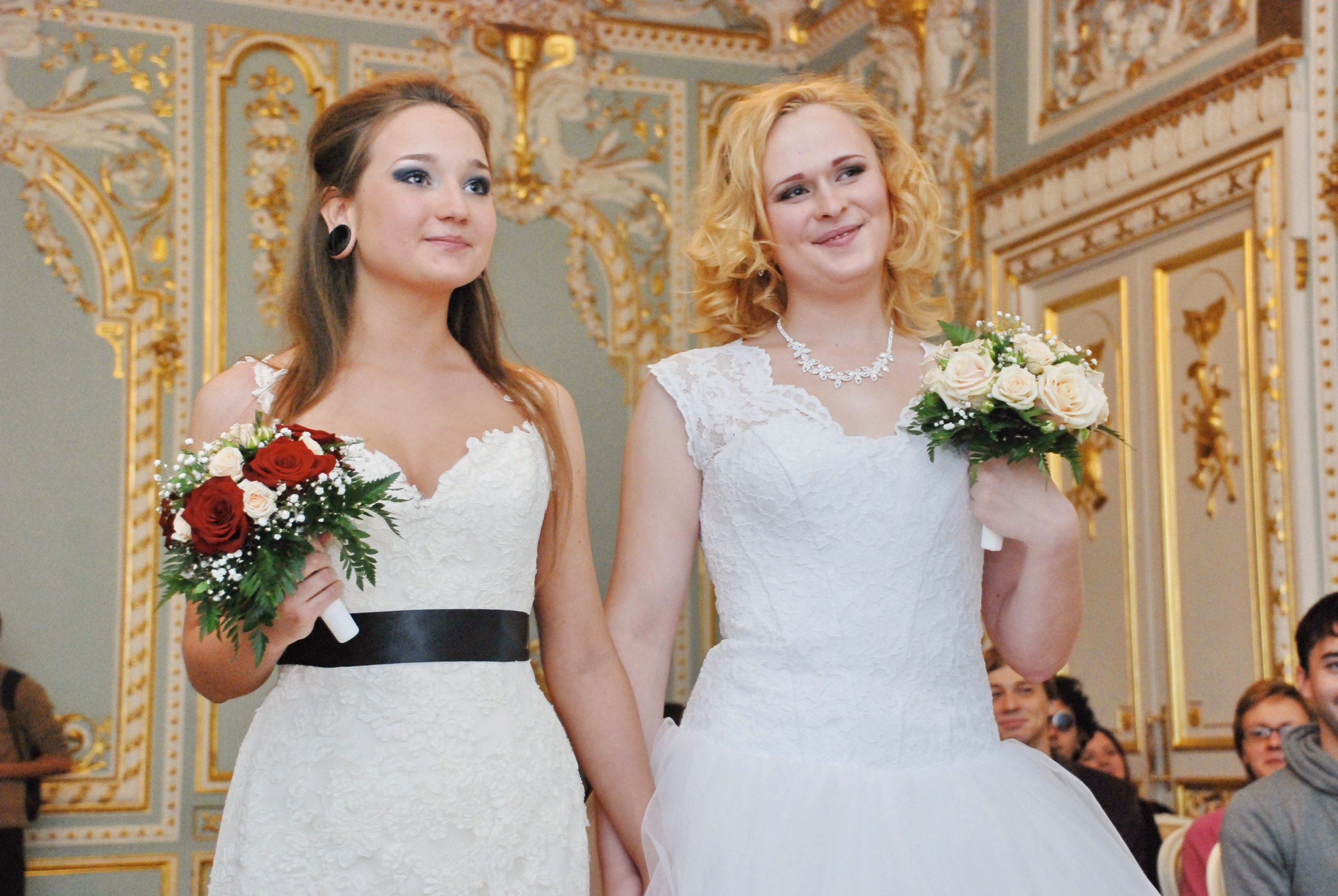
Lesbian wedding including a trans woman in Saint Petersburg, Russia, 2014

=== Trans women ===
In their sociological study, Martin S. Weinberg and Colin J. Williams interviewed 26 men sexually interested in trans women (MSTW). 13 identified themselves as heterosexual, and 13 as "bisexual or probably bisexual". The authors opined "These labels only superficially describe their sexual interest," and noted that the expressed interest in trans women was sometimes used as a basis for denying a more stigmatized self-identity. As an example, they described a case who "said that he was 'bisexual' rather than 'gay' because he was able to think of the trans women as women".

As part of HIV prevention research in 2004, Operario et al. interviewed 46 men in the San Francisco area who had sex with transgender women, but found "no consistent patterns between how men described their sexual orientation identity versus their sexual behavior and attraction to transgender women". Of the sample, 20 of them described themselves as being straight or heterosexual. Some men were definitive about this declaration, while others were hesitant and wondered if they should consider themselves bisexual.

A Northwestern University study recruited 205 men interested in trans women. In that online survey, 52.9% identified as straight, 37.3% as bisexual, and 2.6% as gay, and 7% as something else. Also, 55.9% said their ideal partner would be a cisgender woman, and 34.7% said it would be a trans woman. The study authors concluded that "The interest in trans women appears to be a distinct sexual interest separate from heterosexual men's attraction to women for the majority of men, but there is a substantial minority who may experience it as their sexual orientation."

A 2016 study that used a phallometry device demonstrated that the arousal patterns, genital and subjective, of cisgender men who report attraction to transgender women who have "female-typical physical characteristics (e.g. breasts) while retaining a penis" are similar to those of straight men and different from those of gay men. The study showed that these men are much more aroused to female than to male stimuli. They differed from both the groups of straight and gay men, however, in also displaying strong arousal to stimuli featuring trans women, to which they responded as much as to the cisgender female stimuli. Of the men attracted to trans women, 41.7% identified as bisexual, with the remainder identifying as straight. The bisexuals among them did not display significantly more arousal to male stimuli than their heterosexual counterparts, though they did report a higher number of male sex partners.

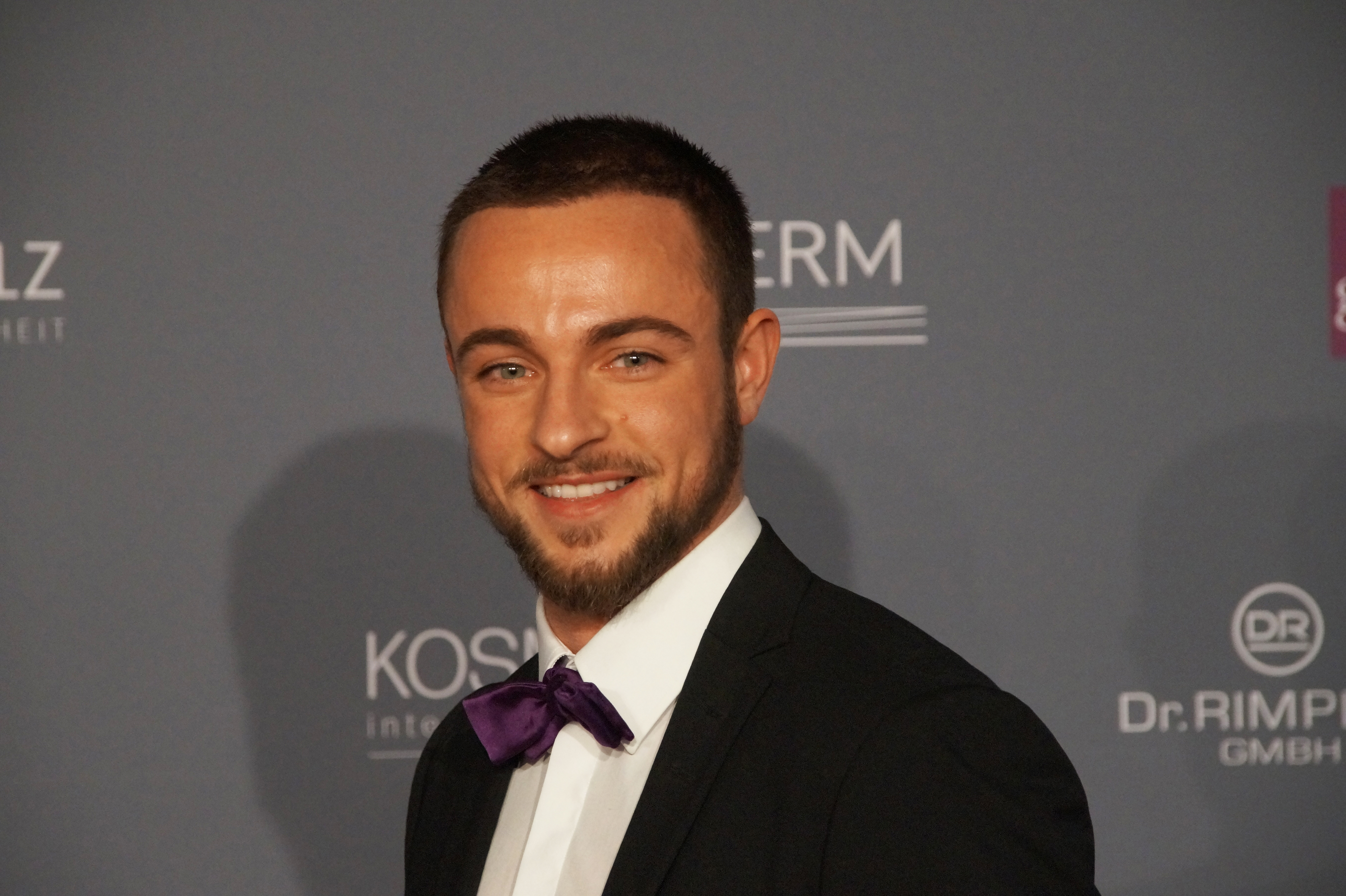
German model Benjamin Melzer, a trans man whom PETA hired to pose near-nude for a "sexy" anti-fur campaign

=== Trans men ===
In 2015, The Palgrave Handbook of the Psychology of Sexuality and Gender described a lack of research exploring others' attraction to trans men or nonbinary FTM persons. This is because much of sexual research often centers the "experiences and perspectives of heterosexual males," who generally have sex with trans women rather than trans men.

The traditional understanding of lesbian does not convey attraction to trans men. A lesbian whose partner transitions to a trans man generally identifies as queer rather than lesbian. Similarly, a heterosexual man whose partner transitions to male would generally use the "queer" label as well.

Erotic materials created for people attracted to trans men have become more visible, especially due to pornographic actor Buck Angel. Trans activist Jamison Green writes that cisgender gay men who are partnered with trans men "are often surprised to find that a penis is not what defines a man, that the lack of a penis does not mean a lack of masculinity, manliness, or male sexuality".

=== Terminology ===
A variety of casual terms have developed to refer to people who are attracted to transgender people. These terms include trans-attracted, transamorous, trans-oriented, transfan, trans admirer, and trans catcher. The terms transromantic, transamorous and transsensual have also emerged, but have not seen much usage.

The terms tranny chaser (often shortened to chaser) and tranny hawk have been used, although tranny is considered a slur by many. The term chaser is predominantly used to describe cisgender men who are solely sexually interested in trans women, but the term is sometimes used to refer to others, such as cisgender women, and/or those interested in trans men. Transgender people often use the term in a pejorative sense, because they consider chasers as referring to those who value them for their trans status alone, rather than being attracted to them as a whole person. However, some instead claim this term in an affirming manner. Sociologist Avery Tompkins of Transylvania University in Kentucky argued in an article in the Journal of Homosexuality that sex-positive trans politics cannot emerge if terms such as "tranny chaser" inform discussion of attraction to transgender people.

In some literature, the terms gynandromorphophilic (noun: gynandromorphophilia) and gynemimetophilic (noun: gynemimetophilia) are used for men who are attracted to trans women who possess a combination of male and female physical characteristics. The term andromimetophilic (noun: andromimetophilia) describes an attraction to trans men.

The terms skoliosexual and ceterosexual have been used to describe attraction to non-binary people. The terms pansexual and polysexual (as well as bisexual) may be used by some people to indicate that gender variant people are among the types of people to which one is attracted.

== From transgender people ==
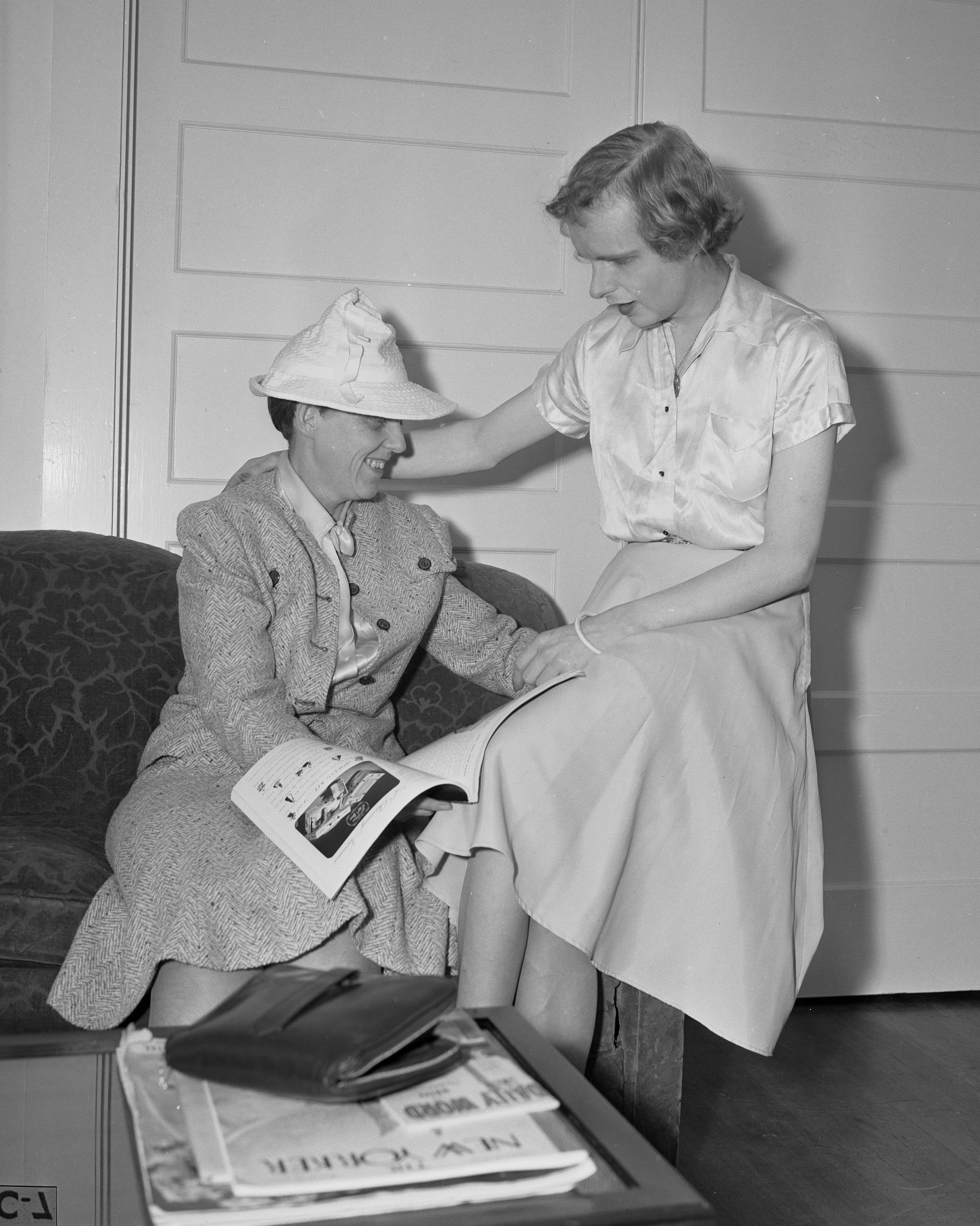
Richard Wilcox (left), a transgender man, and Barbara Ann Richards (right), a transgender woman; a trans for trans married couple, photographed in 1941

Transgender people may experience sexual and romantic attraction to other transgender people. This attraction is sometimes called "trans for trans" or T4T attraction. The word T4T comes from Craigslist personals and forums transgender people used to find other transgender people to date and have sex with. Another term for T4T is "transromantic", though it is rarely used.

There are a variety of reasons why transgender people might date or prefer dating other transgender people. Some transgender people prefer dating and having sex with other transgender people for both emotional and physical safety reasons, as cisgender people are more likely to enact gender-based violence. Others feel that dating and having sex with other transgender people is "liberating", as it allows more gender euphoria, emotional safety, and freedom to explore gender presentation without the need to prove or explain the validity of their identity. Others may simply find other transgender people more attractive than cisgender people. Lastly, T4T dating can also be a form of political identity, i.e., a form of separatism focused on advocating for transgender people within a society that may discriminate against them.

As an example of a T4T couple, in 2022, Canadian actors Elliot Page and Mae Martin attended the LACMA Art + Film Gala as a couple. Martin captioned their photograph with "My King" and "#t4t."

In the context of trans-men for trans-men relationships, a Daddy/boy dynamic can be part of the gender affirmation process, as it may lead to experiences of gender euphoria. In 2022, Transgender Studies Quarterly studied the correlation claimed that a Daddy/boy dynamic between trans people "can be read as gender labor; affective and intersubjective work that produces gender".

== See also ==
- List of transgender-related topics
- Transgender sex workers
- Transgender sexuality
- Fetishization of LGBTQ people
