= Switch hitter (disambiguation) =

A switch hitter is a baseball player who bats both right-handed and left-handed.

Switch hitter may also refer to:

- Switch-hitter, a boxer who can fight in both orthodox (right-handed) and southpaw (left-handed) stances
- "Switch Hitter", a season 2 episode of the sitcom Arrested Development
- A slang term for a bisexual person

== See also ==
- Switch hit, a cricket shot
