= Femboy =

Slang term used for a feminine male

A femboy.

Femboy (/ˈfɛmbɔɪ/) is a slang term that typically refers to male individuals who express themselves with traditionally feminine characteristics, or—in the variant spelling femboi—to young trans men or butch lesbians. As an Internet aesthetic, this may be through the use of jewellery, wearing feminine clothing and makeup, or expressing feminine behavioural qualities. Femboy can be used as both a sexual and non-sexual term; it does not denote a specific sexual orientation or gender role.

The term has been documented since the 1990s. It has since been popularised through internet forums and social media, starting on 4chan and expanding to other sites such as Reddit and TikTok, where hashtag trends such as "#femboyfriday" have received attention in the media. In porn studies, the term has been seen as an identifier for a submissive role during sex and as exhibiting elements of sexual fantasy.

== Usage ==
=== Etymology ===
According to Dictionary.com, the term femboy originated at least in the 1990s. It is a compound noun from the words fem (an abbreviation of feminine and femme) and boy. However, one early usage can be found in the 1981 release of the Abbreviations Dictionary by editor and photographer Ralph De Sola. The variant femboi uses the LGBTQ term boi. By 2000, the term boi had come to denote "a young, attractive gay man". The term "boi" has also been used, independently of any meaning related to sexuality, as an alternate spelling for boy.

=== Definitions ===
Collins English Dictionary defines femboy as "a male whose appearance and behavioural traits are regarded as conventionally feminine". The term describes gender expression rather than necessarily indicating an individual's sexual orientation or gender identity. Originally the term was used as a pejorative against non-masculine men but has since been reappropriated.

Although commonly associated with feminine-presenting cisgender men, the label is also used by some transgender men and non-binary people. Its use to describe transgender women can be offensive, especially when the person does not identify with the label.

The associated aesthetic commonly incorporates traditionally feminine clothing, including skirts, dresses, makeup, nail polish, and other accessories. Femboys interviewed by Vice and the Evening Standard have described adopting the label as a means of finding community and challenging conventional masculinity stereotypes and expectations.

The term is also used in pornographic contexts, although its usage is not restricted to pornography.

== Attributes ==
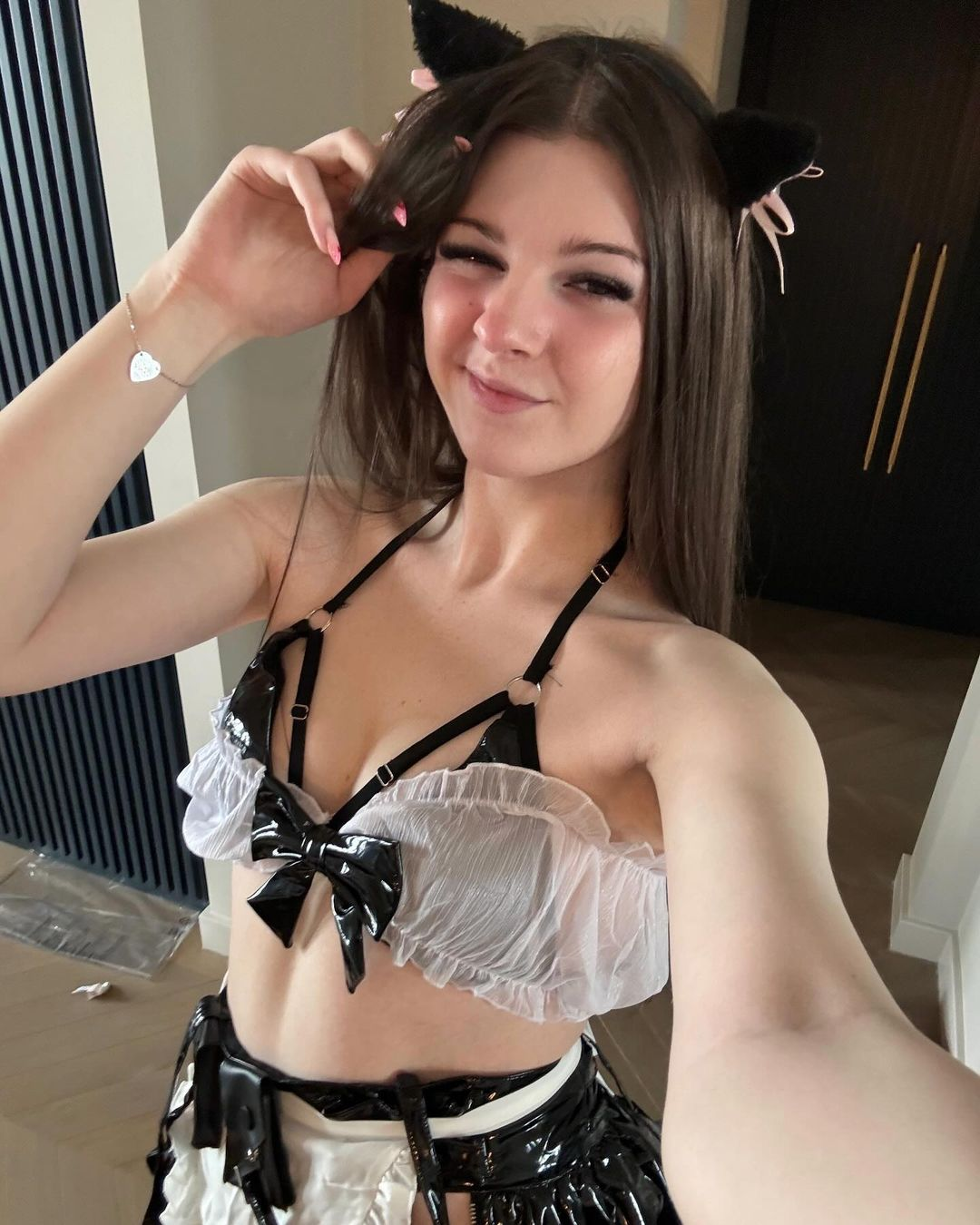
F1NN5TER, a genderfluid influencer, depicted here several months after beginning hormone replacement therapy, variously refers to himself as a girl, boy, or femboy.

A 2022 analysis of the most followed male creators on TikTok identified the presence of effeminate attributes, such as the use of hair dye and jewelry. The paper found that the platform's top creators were "quite homogeneous; [...] almost exclusively white, toned, and young, with perfect or near perfect facial symmetry and considerable bodily adornment", stating that the male creators used the term as a replacement to the labels of effeminate and gay. A femboy may engage in cross-dressing—garments associated with the femboy aesthetic include skirts, dresses, and thigh highs. Jules Joanne Gleeson claims 4chan femboys are "often but not always assisted by HRT." Many femboys idealise a feminine form with a flat chest, leading some to use medicines used in gender-affirming hormone therapy in combination with substances purported to stunt breast growth. The element of youth in femboy culture has raised questions on how long one can remain a femboy.

For trans women, being a femboy can be a way of avoiding the medical difficulties of transitioning. Gleeson also proposes the existence of the femboy as a method to escape both internal and external transphobia, alongside "the unique stigma" experienced by transgender women. She sees the femboy as a "self-made effeminate phenomenon" opposing traditional medical practice surrounding gender transition and as an example of "the erratic state of contemporary gender relations".

Femboy is similar to the term shemale in that they both refer to individuals exhibiting masculine and feminine behaviors simultaneously; they express femininity in a delicate manner without the presence of the sexualised female body, such as large breasts. In the academic journal Porn Studies, Emerald Vaught sees femboys as encompassing both effeminate cisgender men and, despite this lack of corporeal femininity, bottoming trans women. In pornography, she sees the femboy as sharing the idea of a "youthful appearance" with twinks and as "represent[ing] an element of sexual fantasy" of transgender femininity.

== Presence ==
A proposed femboy pride flag

After the term was appropriated on the Internet since the late 2010s and early 2020s, femboy communities began to form. Around 2018, the term femboy was found almost exclusively on 4chan, especially on the /lgbt/ forum. It later became popular on platforms such as Reddit and TikTok. Reddit has hosted both sexual and non-sexual femboy content. The community r/feminineboys was started in 2012 and had 303,000 members by May 2025; the site also contains pornographic communities like r/FemBoys. TikTok has been called a safe space in allowing freedom of gender expression. The femboy aesthetic has been compared with figures in popular culture such as Harry Styles; viral trends such as "#FemboyFriday" and memes such as "Femboy Hooters" have helped to popularise the aesthetic. An unofficial femboy pride flag exists, which uses seven horizontal stripes with the colours pink, light pink, white, and light blue. These represent the feminine aesthetic, feminine behaviour, non-binary identities, and masculinity.

According to Aye Lei Tun, femboy culture was present in Myanmar's Spring Revolution, protesting against the ruling military junta imposed after the 2021 coup d'état. In the protests, femboy outfits were used to gain exposure, with gender-nonconforming outfits being worn by non-femboy protestors. Tun sees the introduction of femboy culture, which was previously unfamiliar to Myanmar, as a tactic to lead towards a "social and cultural ideological revolution". A 2021 publication by the ISEAS – Yusof Ishak Institute described femboy activity against the junta as causing "subversion of its assertion of rule", drawing comparison to opposition to United States involvement in the Vietnam War and the anti-war "make love, not war" slogan.

== Reception ==
The femboy aesthetic has been described by Vice News as "breaking traditional norms of masculinity", demonstrating that "oppressive gender norms are slowly breaking down". On the social media platform TikTok, the aesthetic has enjoyed popularity, although creators of femboy-style posts have received homophobic and violent threats.

Critics have seen femboys as perpetuating male dominance and disregarding existing discourse on gender identity. An article by Marissa Lee in Mission criticised straight femboys for "claim[ing] responsibility for breaking such boundaries" and "do[ing] next to nothing for the conversation surrounding gender fluidity. If anything, [the existence of femboys] emphasises the all-encompassing maleness." An article in Social Media + Society has said the "femboy aesthetic" of the most popular content creators on TikTok "map[s] onto and reinforce[s] extant patterns of gender inequality", and does little to challenge heteronormative views of masculinity:

When and if men cross gender boundaries [...], they do so while alluding to masculinities' hegemonic qualities, pairing their behaviours with lyrics and physical gestures that sexualize women and re-assert men's virility, bravado, and strength as a form of heterosexual recuperation.

The alt-right and anti-gender movement have deemed the emergence of femboys a result of the LGBTQ chemicals conspiracy theory, alongside "the existence of gender-morphing frogs"; figures such as Guillaume Faye have called the "effeminization" of society an example of Western societal decay.

== See also ==
- Bishōnen – Japanese term for an attractive young man
- E-kid – Youth subculture
- Great Male Renunciation – Turning point in men's fashion
- Otokonoko – Japanese men who cross-dress as women
- Peacock revolution – 1950s – 1970s fashion movement
- Soy boy – Pejorative for men perceived as feminine
- Tomboy – Girl who behaves boyishly
