= Shemale =

Term primarily used in sex work

Shemale (also spelled she-male) is a term most commonly used in the pornography industry to describe trans women or other people with male genitalia and female secondary sex characteristics (including breasts) acquired via hormones or surgery. Many people in the transgender community consider the term offensive and degrading. Using the term shemale for a trans woman may imply that she is working in the sex trade.

== Academic use ==
The term has been used by some psychologists to refer to transgender women who have transitioned, but have never undergone genital surgery.

Some biologists have used shemale to refer to male non-human animals displaying female traits or behaviors, such as female pheromones being given off by male reptiles. Joan Roughgarden, a biologist having surveyed sex and gender in animals, rejected use of the term in the reptile literature, as she says it is "degrading and has been borrowed from the porn industry."

== Other usage ==
Since the mid-19th century, the term she-male has been applied to "almost anyone who appears to have bridged gender lines", including effeminate men and lesbians. In the early 19th century, she-male was used as a colloquialism in American literature for female, often pejoratively. Davy Crockett is quoted as using the term in regard to a shooting match; when his opponent challenges Crockett to shoot near his opponent's wife, Crockett is reported to have replied: "'No, No, Mike,' sez I, 'Davy Crockett's hand would be sure to shake, if his iron pointed within a hundred miles of a shemale, and I give up beat...'" It was used through the 1920s to describe a woman, usually a feminist or an intellectual.

The term came to have a more negative connotation over time and been used to describe a "hateful woman" or "bitch." Up through the mid-1970s, it was used to describe an assertive woman, "especially a disliked, distrusted woman; a bitch."

The term later took on an implicit sexual overtone. In her 1990 book, From Masculine To Feminine And All points In Between, Jennifer Anne Stevens defined she-male as "usually a gay male who lives full-time as a woman; a gay transgenderist." The Oxford English Dictionary defines she-male as "a passive male homosexual or transvestite." It has been used as gay slang for faggot.

== Connotations ==
In 1979, Janice Raymond employed the term as a derogatory descriptor for trans women in her controversial book, The Transsexual Empire: The Making of the She-Male. Raymond and other cultural feminists like Mary Daly argue that a "she-male" or "male-to-constructed female" is still male and constitutes a patriarchal attack by males upon the female essence. This is often considered to be part of trans-exclusionary radical feminist (TERF) ideology. In some cultures, shemale can also be used interchangeably with other terms referring to trans women.

The term has since become a derogatory term applied to trans women. Psychologists Dana Finnegan and Emily Mcnally write that the term "tends to have demeaning connotations." Lisa Z. Sigel & John Phillips write that shemale is "a linguistic oxymoron that simultaneously reflects but, by its very impossibility, challenges [gender] binary thinking, collapsing the divide between the masculine and the feminine." Trans author Leslie Feinberg writes, "'he-she' and 'she-male' describe the person's gender expression with the first pronoun and the birth sex with the second. The hyphenation signals a crisis of language and an apparent social contradiction, since sex and gender are 'supposed' to match." Jack Halberstam, director of the Institute for Research on Women, Gender and Sexuality, describes she-male as "a degrading pornographic term". The Gay and Lesbian Alliance Against Defamation has said the term is a "dehumanizing slur" and should not be used "except in a direct quote that reveals the bias of the person quoted."

Willow Arune wrote, "Using the term she-male for a transsexual woman would be considered highly offensive, for it implies that she is working 'in the [sex] trade.' It may be considered libelous." Melissa Hope Ditmore, of the Trafficked Persons Rights Project, says the term "is an invention of the sex industry, and most transwomen find the term abhorrent." Biologist and transgender activist Julia Serano states that it remains "derogatory or sensationalistic." According to sex columnist Regina Lynn, "Porn marketers use 'she-male' for a very specific purpose — to sell porn to straight guys without triggering their homophobia — that has nothing to do with actual transgendered people (or helping men overcome their homophobia, either)."

Some have adopted the term as a self-descriptor, often in the context of sex work. Gender non-conforming author Kate Bornstein wrote that a friend who self-identified as "she-male" described herself as "tits, big hair, lots of make-up, and a dick." Pornographic actress Wendy Williams stated, "I don't think tranny and she-male are slurs. They were words initially used so the laymen person could understand the products they were buying in porn. There are more issues we have to worry about: suicide, the homeless rate, getting an education and finding jobs as trans women." According to sex columnist Sasha, "The term shemale is used in [the pornography] setting to denote a fetishized sexual persona and is not typically used by transgendered women outside of sex work. Many transgendered women are offended by this categorization and call themselves T-girls or trans."

== In popular culture ==
In addition to its use in pornography, the term has been used as a punch line or for rhetorical effect. Flora Finch starred in The She-Male Sleuth, a 1920 film comedy. As part of the 42nd Street Art Project in 1994, designer Adelle Lutz turned a former shop in Times Square called American Male into "American She-Male", with brightly colored mannequins and clothes made of condoms. The 2004 Arrested Development episode "Sad Sack" had a gag where Maeby tricks Lindsay into wearing a shirt that says "Shémale", in order to convince a suitor Lindsay is transgender. Film critic Manohla Dargis has written about the lack of "real women" in summer blockbusters, claiming Judd Apatow comedies feature men who act more like leading ladies: "These aren't the she-males you find in the back pages of The Village Voice, mind you. The Apatow men hit the screen anatomically intact: they’re emasculated but not castrated, as the repeated images of the flopping genitals in Forgetting Sarah Marshall remind you."

The word came under extreme criticism when it was used during episode four of RuPaul's Drag Race season 6. Logo TV, the show's broadcast station, released a statement on April 14, 2014, saying: "We wanted to thank the community for sharing their concerns around a recent segment and the use of the term 'she-mail' on Drag Race. Logo has pulled the episode from all of our platforms and that challenge will not appear again. Furthermore, we are removing the 'You've got she-mail' intro from new episodes of the series. We did not intend to cause any offense, but in retrospect we realize that it was insensitive. We sincerely apologize."

== See also ==
- Attraction to transgender people
- Fetishization of LGBTQ people
- Futanari
- Hermaphrodite
- Kathoey
- Transsexual pornography
