= Trans chaser =

Term for cisgender men attracted to trans people

Trans chaser, (Note: Also sometimes called tranny chaser) often shortened to chaser, is a term used to describe cisgender people who are primarily sexually interested in trans women, but it is sometimes used to refer to interest in trans men or non-binary people as well.

Transgender people often use the term in a pejorative sense, because they consider chasers to value them for their trans status alone, rather than being attracted to them as a person; however, some claim this term in an affirming manner. Sociologist Avery Tompkins of Transylvania University in Kentucky argued in an article in the Journal of Homosexuality that sex-positive trans politics cannot emerge if terms such as tranny chaser inform discussion of attraction to transgender people.

== See also ==
- List of transgender-related topics
- Attraction to transgender people
- Fetishization of LGBTQ people
- Transgender sexuality
- Tranny
