= Shipping ethics controversy in fanfiction =

Debate over romantic and sexual content in fanfiction

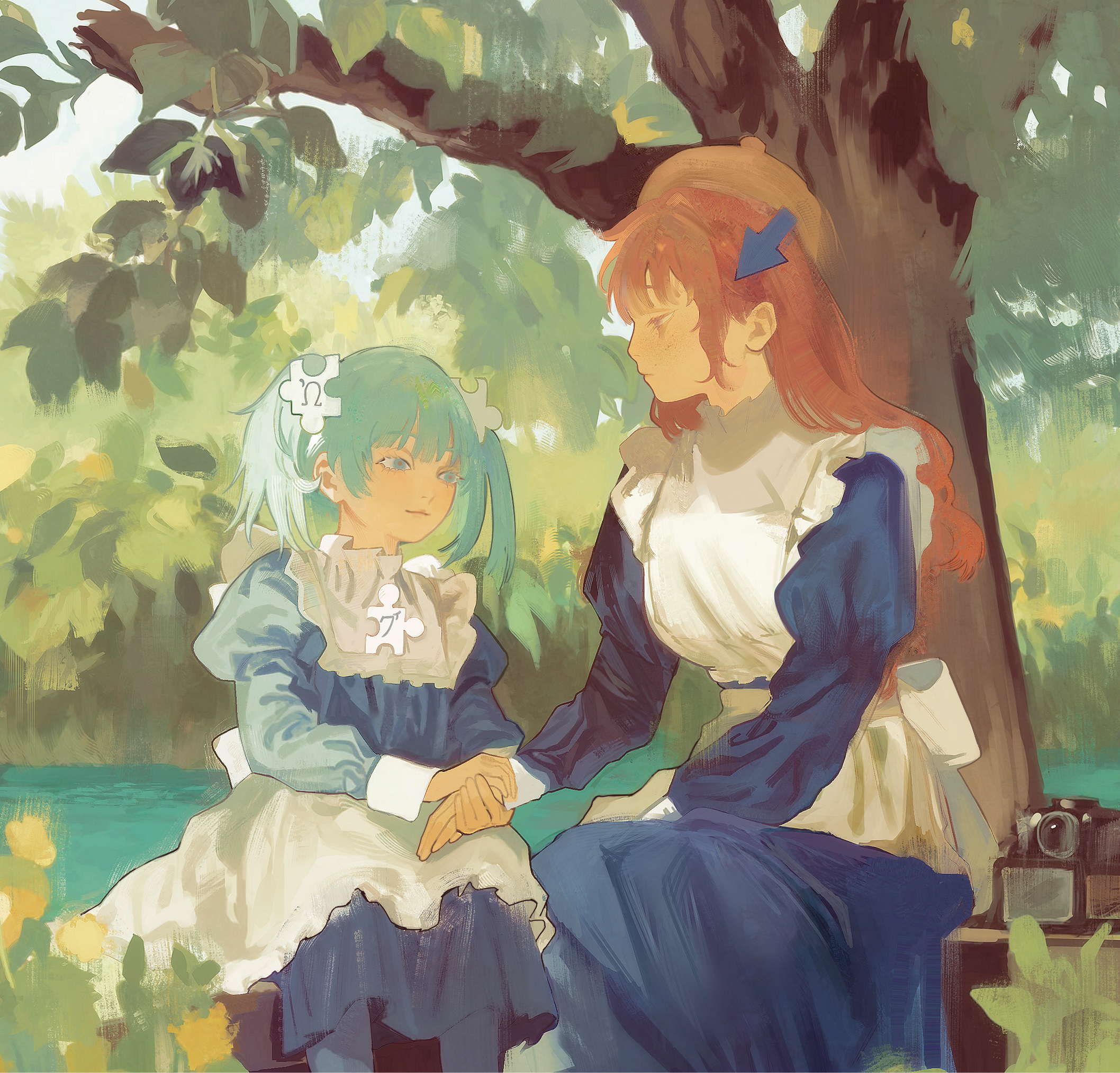
Significant age gaps and incest in fictional relationships are common subjects of the discourse.

Beginning in the mid-2010s and continuing into the 2020s, significant discourse emerged in online fandom spaces around the ethical implications of taboo and abusive content within shipping, the depiction of romantic or sexual relationships between characters in fanfiction and other fan-made works. The disagreement primarily centers on the degree to which fictional works depicting such content affect real-world behavior and attitudes.

The Internet allowed fans to share their works freely and anonymously, enabling them to depict disturbing content such as sexual abuse, rape, incest, and pedophilia, often with little connection to the source material. Anti-shippers, also referred to as antis, take the view that such fictional portrayals normalize harmful dynamics and behaviors, and pose a risk to children and sexual abuse survivors. Fanfiction depicting underage characters in sexual contexts is often characterized as child pornography, and the legality of such works varies greatly between jurisdictions. As the main opposition against anti-shippers, pro-shippers view that anti-ship equates to restricting artistic freedom and allowing moral censorship, and generally reject the notion that works including such themes influence the real-world behaviors of their readers and writers.

The discourse has been most prevalent among the younger, heavily LGBTQ fan communities on websites such as Tumblr and Archive of Our Own. Both pro-shippers and anti-shippers generally espouse progressive beliefs and share similar demographics. Members of both factions have been accused of online harassment. Critics of anti-shippers have characterized the movement as a moral panic or censorship campaign; they oppose the equating of fictional content with real-world sexual abuse, and also the spread of moralistic attitudes towards sexuality. Pro-shippers have also faced criticism for minimizing other critiques against fan works, such as anti-racist criticism.

== Background ==
The term "shipping", derived from "relationshipping", initially emerged in the mid-1990s within the X-Files fandom to refer to the fan practice of supporting a hypothetical romantic relationship between the main protagonists, Fox Mulder and Dana Scully. Supporters of romance between the two characters titled themselves "shippers", seeing it as the inevitable resolution of the show's unresolved sexual tension. They were opposed within the fandom by "No-Romancers", who viewed the two characters' relationship as platonic friendship. Shippers often turned to fanfiction to depict romantic and sexual interactions between the characters, leading to contemporary fanfiction websites aligned with either camp. The term later broadened to include supporters of any fan pairing of fictional characters. Such dynamics paralleled far older romantic pairings depicted in slash fanfiction, a term originating in the early 1970s Star Trek fandom. Even earlier examples of romantic fanfiction retroactively described as shipping include the 1914 novel Old Friends and New Fancies: An Imaginary Sequel to the Novels of Jane Austen.

Many shippers become strongly emotionally invested in their preferred romantic relationships, even when no such pairing is portrayed in canon. Because of this, conflict (dubbed "ship wars" in fan communities) can emerge in a fandom between proponents of different ships. This is exacerbated when there are multiple plausible partners for a particular character, such as within love triangles. By the early 2000s, anti-fans opposed to certain ships came to be known as "anti-shippers". This term can include both fans who lack interest in the ship (non-shippers) and fans who oppose the plausibility or morality of the relationship. In smaller communities, such conflicts can affect which ships are featured in fanfiction the most, leading to increased stakes for participants.

=== Internet fandom and fanfiction websites ===
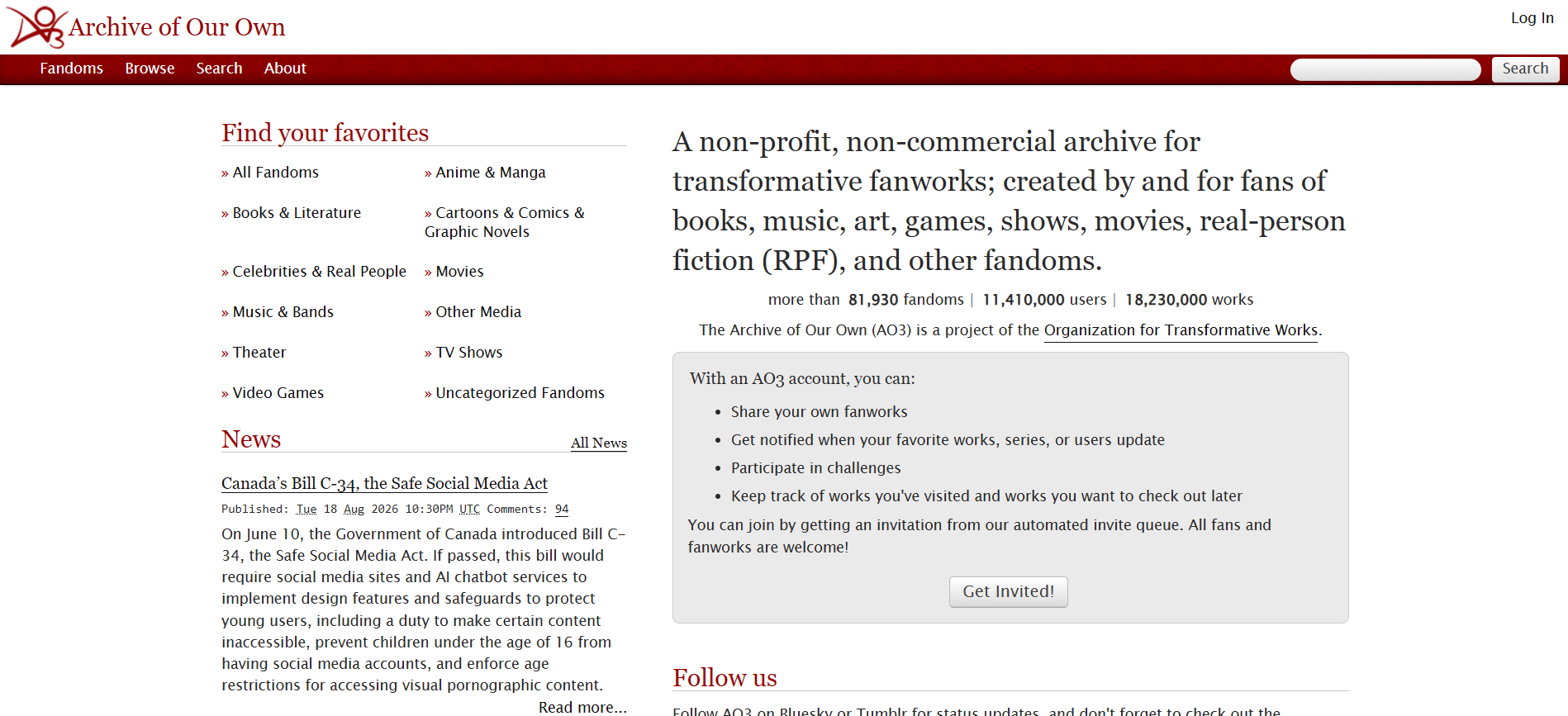
Front page of Archive of Our Own, 2026

The emergence of Internet fan communities during the 1990s allowed for the proliferation of taboo fanfiction in an anonymous environment. Traditionally, erotica, homoerotic romance, and depictions of torture (most notably in "hurt-comfort" works) were carefully distributed only within small cliques interested in such works. In the 1990s, fanfiction proliferated on forums and platforms like Usenet. However, controversies about erotic fanfiction dissuaded some authors from posting their works.

Later on, large fan-work host websites, such as DeviantArt and FanFiction.Net, allowed the free spread of work without gatekeeping or the risk of connection to their creators' offline identities. These websites still forced works to adhere to terms of service that allowed the fansites to remain profitable to advertisers. Fanfiction portraying graphic violence or explicit sexuality was subject to frequent bouts of censorship and removal, which fans called "purges". Some purged works depicted abuse, torture, violence, rape, incest, necrophilia, pedophilia, or bestiality. Such taboo works usually have no specific basis in the source material, which is often originally marketed towards children and young adults.

In 2007, an American group named "Warriors for Innocence" launched a pressure campaign against LiveJournal, the largest blogging content host in the 2000s, to remove extreme sexual writings. Six Apart, the owners of LiveJournal, briefly removed around five hundred journals in response; this prompted widespread community outrage, and Six Apart apologized and reinstated much of the content over the following months. When LiveJournal was acquired by the Russian online media corporation SUP later in 2007, the site underwent a mass-scale removal of content considered explicit under Russian media laws, including many LGBTQ works. The "destruction of LiveJournal communities" and ongoing censorship from Fanfiction.net led to the creation of the Organization for Transformative Works (OTW) and the Archive of Our Own (AO3), a nonprofit and advertisement-free hosting site for fanfiction. The gradual migration of much of the fanfiction community to AO3 allowed for the sharing of taboo works without censorship. AO3 implements a tagging system which allows authors to disseminate the work to particular fandoms and mark works containing triggering or upsetting content.

== Emergence ==
LiveJournal centered around communities divided by theme, making it more difficult for fans to discover content they wished not to see. The emergence of social media sites such as Tumblr and Twitter centralized the content of fan communities, allowing for more crossover between disparate parts of the community. Fan communities on the Internet grew rapidly with the rise of social media, creating many younger fans with little connection to or knowledge of earlier fan communities.

Tumblr, launched in 2007, received an influx of fan creators from the controversies on LiveJournal. The site's unique system of post dissemination and tagging both allows for the discussion of social justice issues and intense conflict between different online fan communities. Tumblr discussion trends towards participants falling into separate camps based on the members' viewpoints and identities, sometimes creating highly combative "contact zones" where rival factions debate issues. The tagging system resulted in fans and opponents of the same ships using the same tags to discuss it. As this led to conflict between fans, it became a point of etiquette to use separate tags for critical content, sometimes summarized as "don't tag your hate". However, the use of divergent tags inadvertently formed groups centered around their opposition to a ship. Fans in these communities sought to emphasize their dislike for ships to gain acceptance from their peers, leading to more extreme backlash and harassment of opponents. The use of "anti-" as a prefix in tags opposing a ship led to other fans dubbing members of such communities "antis".

Tensions over pairings between characters within the 2016–2018 television series Voltron: Legendary Defender contributed to a large-scale expansion of shipping discussion in fandom spaces. Fans of the series saw a canonical gay couple as likely, due to comments by the show's creators saying that they wished to have an inclusive cast of characters. Conflict between different ships in the fandom became politicized, each side wishing to present their ship as the moral option. Opponents of the romantic pairing of the characters Keith and Shiro characterized the relationship as pedophilic due to the characters being 18 and 25 years old respectively. Media scholar Mel Stanfill described the advocacy for a particular gay ship by fans through their works as "the ingredients of the anti argument that fan fiction is advocacy for whatever sex appears in the story".

In Chinese fan communities in 2019, conflict emerged over a real person fiction ship between Xiao Zhan and Wang Yibo, the main actors of the TV series The Untamed, re-imagining Wang Yibo as a minor and Xiao Zhan as a transgender sex worker. The Chinese government banned AO3 in February 2020, which many fans believed to be the result of the controversy over the ship.

Explicit content on Tumblr was stymied by a ban on "not safe for work" material in November 2018. Many anti-shippers migrated to Twitter in the late 2010s, although the movement has not gained the prominence it previously held on Tumblr.

== Viewpoints ==
=== Anti-shippers ===
The terms anti and anti-shipper often refer to opponents of fictional sexual content considered harmful, although "anti" can also be applied to anti-fans more generally. The question of whether fiction affects reality is a central point of dispute between anti-shippers and the opposing camp of "pro-shippers". Anti-shippers generally believe that taboo or abusive sexual content within fiction influences the views and actions of those who consume it, with pro-shippers disagreeing with anti-shippers for a broad spectrum of reasons, ranging from a complete rejection of fictional media's influence on behavior to a defense of harmful sexual dynamics when properly depicted as abusive.

Although specific viewpoints vary significantly within the community, anti-shippers generally share some core beliefs. Anti-shippers oppose depictions of rape, incest, and pedophilia (which they consider harmful to survivors of sexual abuse), as well as power imbalances (including age gaps) in relationships and the perceived fetishization of homosexual relationships. Depictions of pedophilia are a major focus of anti-shippers, who argue that sexual content involving underage fictional characters is child pornography and that the dissemination of such works can function as a grooming tactic to normalize sexual relations between adults and children. Anti-shippers generally view an author's inclusion of such harmful content or themes in a work as a reflection of the author's personal views and desires.

Legal restrictions on such material vary greatly between different countries and jurisdictions. In the United States, where the Organization for Transformative Works (OTW) is based, sexual material which includes fictional depictions of minors is prohibited under federal obscenity law, although such restrictions face frequent legal challenges. Anti-shippers oppose the OTW's policies towards such content, arguing that it should be banned from the site. When depicting characters that are canonically minors in sexual contexts, artists often include disclaimers that characters in their work are depicted as adults to protect themselves from possible legal ramifications.

Some fans warn that they do not wish to see such content or interact with their creators through "DNI" (Do Not Interact) notices on their personal pages. DNIs are also used to signal opposition to either anti-shippers or pro-shippers, frequently listed alongside other disliked groups such as racists and trans-exclusionary radical feminists.

=== Pro-shippers ===
Pro-shippers (also known as anti-antis), (Note: Some sources distinguish anti-antis as a separate position or movement from pro-shippers, while other sources treat the two as synonyms.) etymologically inverted from anti-shipper, (Note: Sometimes said to be abbreviated from "problematic shipper", although other sources describe this as a misconception.) believe that creating or consuming fiction that depicts harmful content does not defend or encourage this behavior in reality. Pro-shippers defend works including disturbing content as beneficial for survivors of abuse, as some writers and readers use it as a way to process and explore their trauma. Some pro-shippers believe that fictional works can affect societal attitudes towards sexuality when portrayed irresponsibly, but they align with the general movement's support of artistic free expression and the continuation of adult content within fan spaces. Pro-shippers emphasize the ability of individuals to choose what they read or create, and view attempts to restrict such content as an infringement on personal liberties.

=== Similarities ===
Both anti- and pro-shippers are largely LGBTQ, reflecting the fanfiction community as a whole—a 2013 survey conducted by fans revealed that only 38% of AO3 users surveyed were heterosexual, with more nonbinary users than men. The two groups are demographically similar in terms of racial, gender, and sexual identities and report similar rates of neurodiversity and survivorship of sexual abuse. Anti-shippers, many aged in their early-to-mid teens, are generally younger than pro-shippers, who are chiefly adults. Owing to this, many pro-shippers consider the anti-ship movement an attack on sexual content in general and an attempt to displace adult-oriented content from fan spaces.

Both camps frequently describe themselves as socially progressive and their opponents as reactionary and problematic. They commonly align themselves with left-wing movements and views (such as Black Lives Matter or anti-police sentiment) and characterize their opposition as running against the viewpoints of such movements.

== Analysis and criticism ==
=== Criticism of anti-shippers ===
The anti-ship movement has been linked to the convergence of call-out culture and "faux activism" within online communities such as Tumblr. The strong emphasis on protecting minors within the anti movement has been described as stemming from broader moral attitudes towards protecting children and adolescents from inappropriate sexuality and maintaining childhood innocence, and may reflect a broader Gen Z discomfort with sexual material. Queer writer Ana Valens criticized the movement for spreading allegations and endangering the financial stability of creators of adult material. Some critics have compared attempts to remove or ban disturbing elements of fanfiction to censorship campaigns against LGBTQ, taboo, or sexual works, and to historical regulatory codes such as the Hays Code and Comics Code. Scholars have variously characterized the movement as a harassment campaign, moral panic, or as an unintentional outgrowth of religious conservatism.

The anti-ship movement has been accused of resorting to online harassment, although some anti-shippers disavow such behavior. Some anti-shippers spam gore, violent pornography, and pedophilic imagery to pro-shippers, AO3 volunteer staff, and content tags associated with taboo fan-works. The "baffling" tactic of intentional dissemination of imagery opposed by the movement has been described by fandom researcher Agnieszka Urbańczyk as a means to attack pro-shippers: "The goal of such actions seems to be marginalization of people who create it or enjoy it." Anti-shippers have also been criticized for sending death threats to pro-shippers. In 2020, Hannibal screenwriter Bryan Fuller was faced with criticism and death threats from anti-shippers after expressing support for pro-shippers. Scholar Renee Ann Drouin, who experienced doxxing and death threats as a result of research she was undertaking related to the Voltron fandom, expresses concern about the challenges these discourses pose to researchers.

=== Criticism of pro-shippers ===
Scholars have criticized pro-shippers for minimizing valid critiques of fan works by labeling any critics of their works as antis. Anti-racist critiques of fanfiction are sometimes described as anti-ship by white fans, leading to an environment where these and other critiques are dismissed as "anti". Pro-shippers have also been accused of engaging in online harassment campaigns, including harassment of people raising anti-racist critiques. The term "anti" itself has been characterized as vague or imprecise, as well as contributing to a lack of nuance in discourse over fanfiction. The media theorist Stitch characterized the division of discourse into anti- and pro-ship camps as an "unhelpful, conversation-ending binary", due to inconsistent and arbitrary criteria for belonging in either faction.

Pro-shippers often express their opposition to "guilt tripping" from anti-shippers, believing that fans should not be shamed for reading or creating disturbing works. Media scholar Mel Stanfill describes this as an appeal to negative liberty (personal freedom from restrictions by others), arguing that pro-shippers' beliefs can be viewed as a form of "civil libertarianism", comparing it to American political defenses of the First Amendment by groups such as the American Civil Liberties Union. Stanfill argues that pro-shippers conflate censorship and regulation, resorting to absolutist positions in which any amount of regulation on works is seen as a slippery slope towards broader censorship.

== See also ==
- Feminist sex wars – Dissenting views within the feminist movement regarding sexuality
- Fetishization of LGBTQ people
- Puriteen – Online neologism
