= Puriteen =

Online neologism

Puriteen is a portmanteau of puritan and teenager used to describe a teenager or young adult whose views on sexuality are seen as sex-negative or moralistic. While the term's original creation is unknown, it began seeing use on Twitter in March 2021. It is frequently used, as noted by Rolling Stone, in reference to individuals who are "well-versed in the language of identity and sexual politics", but are highly critical of those who do not meet their personal standards, particularly in regard to their opposition to sexual content. This has resulted in two separate discussions of what the term represents, with one topic focusing on the idea of "moral purity" against perceived inappropriate relationships in both real life and fictional representations, and the other topic being on the claimed lower amount of sexual activity and sexual relationships among those in Generation Z (Gen Z).

== Usage and analysis ==
The term first gained traction in the early 2020s specifically in reference to certain LGBTQ teenagers. While not typically anti-LGBTQ, the Gen Z individuals the term is referencing often oppose displays of kink, such as wearing leather gear, at Pride parades. According to author Leo Herrera, some of these arguments are not "organic", and are instead pushed by "far-right bad actors" to create conflict and advance anti-gay positions. This has also resulted in terms such as the "new Victorians" coming into usage, along with descriptions such as the "most prudish generation in history". Another common topic, particularly on the social media platform TikTok, has been criticism of individuals involved in age gap relationships, especially celebrities. Saskia Tillers for news.com.au brought up the concept of generational backlash against the opinions of their parents' generation, with Gen Z's more prudish nature being in response to the more sexual openness of their parents.

=== Fandom and shipping culture ===
Some, such as Vox writer Rebecca Jennings, are critical of the term puriteen, arguing that most teenagers have far more nuanced beliefs about sex, and that only a minority are as prudish as the term implies. In an analysis of the Vox article and the overall topic of structural racism in fandom spaces for the journal Feminist Media Histories, literary studies professor Rukmini Pande made a direct distinction between puriteens engaged in "moral 'purity'" and those members of fandom that try to bring up long "systematically sidelined" issues of racism in fan culture and fan media.

Comparatively, Vox writer Aja Romano correlates the concept of "puriteenism" with that of "antishippers" in fandom, who oppose depictions of fictional sexual or romantic relationships ("problematic ships") which they deem morally objectionable. Romano also discusses how culture war issues in the early 2000s have resulted in sex-negative movements being combined with other anti-LGBT and anti-sex groups, including trans-exclusionary radical feminists.

In the 2025 book Affect in Fandom: Fan Creators and Productivity, Polish cultural studies professor Aldona Kobus wrote the chapter titled "In Defence of Popular Culture: Affect and Engagement in Jane Austen’s Northanger Abbey" that discussed modern fandom, shipping, and puriteenism in comparison to the connection between fiction and reality in Jane Austen's work. Addressing the critical morality of puriteens regarding "consumed fiction and the consumer's mindset and behavior", Kobus pointed out that such moral panics have happened repeatedly in history and were a representation of generational conflict. The self-policing of puriteens, however, is more unique and the overall fandom conflict was, in Kobus' opinion, an example of a lack of media literacy.

=== Sexual activity of Gen Z ===
In analyzing published governmental and scientific statistics to determine the viability of the puriteen label to the generation in question, GQ writer Maddie Holden found that Gen Z, on average, are having less sexual activity, along with having fewer partners and at older ages than previous generations. At the same time, the age group is far less evangelical than other generations, being far more accepting of subjects like same-sex marriage and premarital sex. Expanding on statistics about sexual activity, the president of the Spanish Association of Clinical Sexology (AESC), José Díaz, noted that the decline in sexual activity has been occurring for over forty years, long into the generation prior including millennials, meaning employing the label puriteen to only Gen Z individuals is misapplying the cultural impact of surrounding generations.
