= Afternoon Delight (Arrested Development) =

- Arrested Development episode
- Michael (left) finds Gob in a banana suit at the second Bluth company Christmas party.
- Episode no.: Season 2 Episode 6
- Directed by: Jason Bateman
- Written by: Abraham Higginbotham; Chuck Martin
- Cinematography by: Greg Harrington
- Editing by: Richard Candib
- Production code: 2AJD06
- Original air date: December 19, 2004
- Running time: 22 minutes

Guest appearance
- Mae Whitman as Ann Veal

Episode chronology
← Previous "Sad Sack"	Next → "Switch Hitter"
- Arrested Development season 2

"Afternoon Delight" is the sixth episode of the second season of the American television satirical sitcom Arrested Development. It was written by executive story editor Abraham Higginbotham and supervising producer Chuck Martin, and directed by series star Jason Bateman—and is the only episode of the series to be directed by him. It originally aired on the Fox Network on December 19, 2004.

The series, narrated by Ron Howard, follows the Bluths, a formerly wealthy, dysfunctional family, who made their money from property development. In the episode, after getting roasted at the Bluth company Christmas party, Gob fires the entire staff, and Michael must find a way to rehire them. Meanwhile, George Michael and Lindsay feel left out by the family, and Lucille finds herself drugged by Oscar.

Actor Will Arnett found "Afternoon Delight" to be the "most fun" episode of the series to do, highlighting the filming of a scene splitting up a curse word from Gob. The episode was watched by 5.62 million viewers during its original broadcast, and received highly positive reviews from critics. It has been listed on several lists detailing the best Christmas-themed episodes of television. Several critics and scholars have analyzed the episode since its release.

== Plot ==
Michael (Jason Bateman) is upset as his son George Michael (Michael Cera) plans to attend his girlfriend Ann's (Mae Whitman) family Christmas party. Michael's brother Gob (Will Arnett) is excited for the Bluth Company celebration, because he believes his coworkers are going to toast him, while Michael and his niece, Maeby (Alia Shawkat), begin rebuilding the company's banana stand, which has been vandalized by teenagers. They arrive at the party as Gob threatens the employees by strongly advising them not to flirt with his sister Lindsay (Portia de Rossi). The family's matriarch Lucille (Jessica Walter) arrives, and Michael decides to send his brother-in-law Tobias (David Cross) over to her to give her company, only to find that Tobias has painted himself blue in case the Blue Man Group needs him.

As Lindsay finds the party far from enjoyable due to no one flirting with her, while George Michael shows up after a disturbing experience with Ann's religious family. George Michael and Lindsay watch Michael and Maeby perform karaoke of "Afternoon Delight" together on stage, and leave the party feeling abandoned. Gob gets roasted by an employee, and, after the whole staff laughs at him, he fires them all; trying to save the company and rehire all the employees, Michael and Gob decide to throw a new party.

Michael finds his uncle Oscar (Jeffrey Tambor) and asks him to help soothe Lucille, insinuating sex, but Oscar takes this as Michael asking him to drug her. Lindsay and George Michael decide they should spend more time together and opt to go to the second Bluth party together, where they find Gob in the family's banana suit, attempting to cheer his employees up. Lucille, under the effects of Oscar's marijuana, plows her car through the party and toward the banana stand, running over Tobias. She crashes into the banana stand, trapping Gob inside. A nearby Buster (Tony Hale) spots a real crane on the docks and takes control, grabbing his brother Gob out of the crushed banana stand. As he is lifted up out of the stand, Gob hears laughter from the employees, upon which he is abruptly released and plummets into the ocean. Michael again takes to rebuilding the banana stand, happy to find George Michael helping him this time.

== Production ==
"Afternoon Delight" was directed by Jason Bateman, who plays Michael Bluth in the series, and written by executive story editor Abraham Higginbotham and supervising producer Chuck Martin; it was Higginbotham's third writing credit for the series. It was the sixth episode of the season to be filmed, and was the only episode of Arrested Development that Bateman directed.

Will Arnett said he had the "most fun" working on "Afternoon Delight" compared to any other. In the episode, Gob's line, "Are you fucking kidding me?", is split in two—"are you f-" and "-king kidding me?"—and the parts are played in reverse chronological order, (Note: Instead of playing "are you f-" first, the scene opens with "-king kidding me", and the first part is played later on in the episode.) a gag Arnett enjoyed filming. The episode was first released on home video in the United States on October 11, 2005, in the Complete Second Season DVD box set.

== Themes and analysis ==
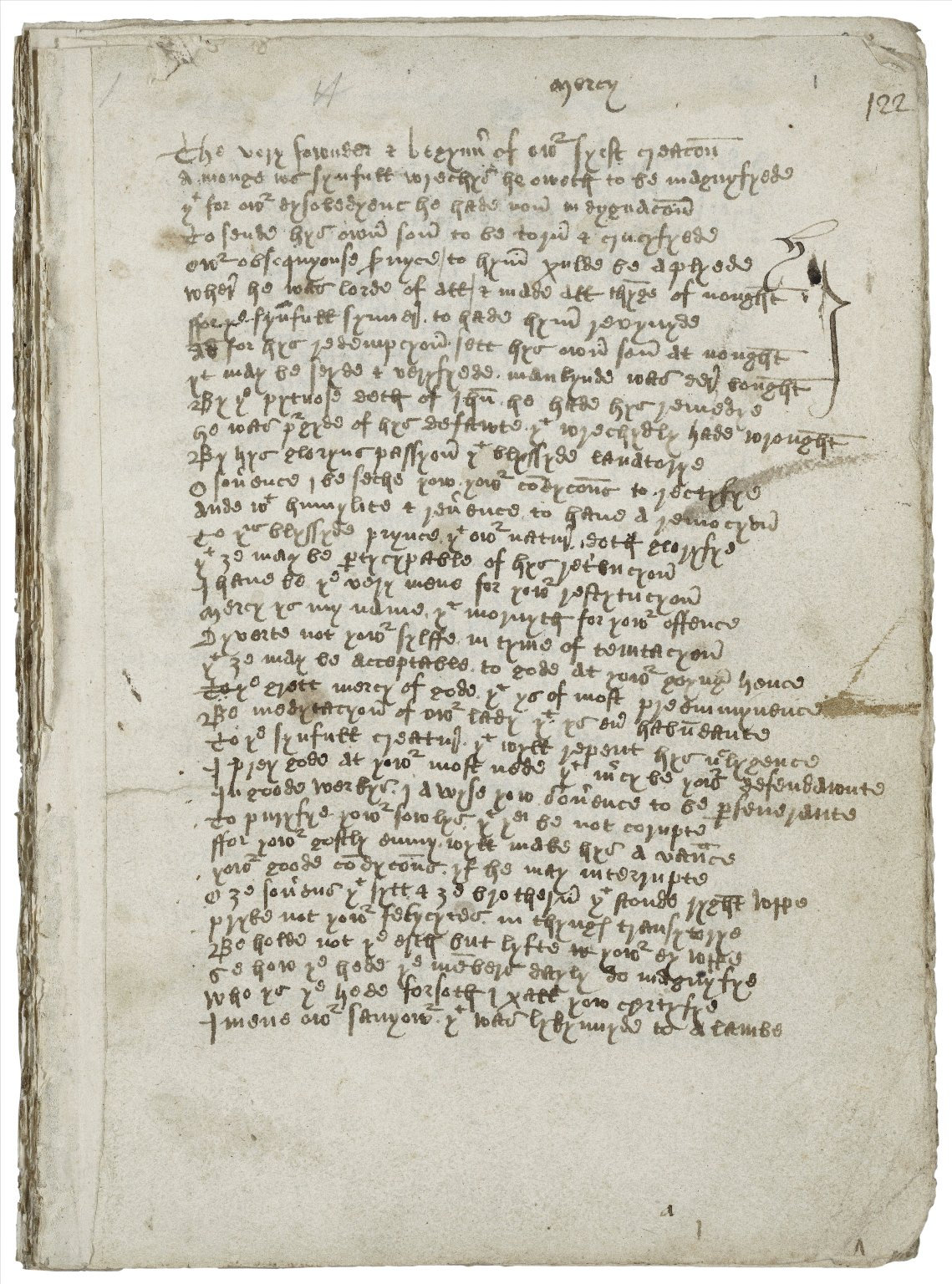
The performance of Afternoon Delight by Michael and Maeby has been compared to aspects of the English play Mankind (pictured).

Michael and Maeby's performance of "Afternoon Delight", a song with strong sexual connotations, has been likened by author David Watt to the English play Mankind, as the two both showcase music bringing people together, even in awkward situations. Watt characterizes Michael's delayed understanding of the song's meaning as an instance of the media trope in which characters realize something only after an inappropriately long time. While using incest as a punchline like many other episodes of the series, "Afternoon Delight" relies noticeably much more on general sexual humor, including a joke hinting at anal sex between Oscar and Lucille.

As suggested by author William Irwin, the episode highlights the Bluth family's poor treatment of their employees; Gob fires the entire staff for roasting him as he'd requested, all while boasting about his expensive suit. Gob's cynical behavior mirrors that of George Sr., but his actions are contrasted by Michael, who generously throws a second party to rehire the supposedly fired employees. Gob's behavior shows he acts the way he thinks he's supposed to, rather than how he wants to. As Bluth company president, he assumes he must be a stern boss, failing to realize he has the free will to behave as he chooses. The episode also continues the subtle running gag of Tobias, a white man, inadvertently describing himself as black. When Lindsay remarks that people often think "big, black man" when they hear Tobias' name, he replies, "Well, obviously, I’m not a big guy," ignoring the "black" comment. Author Kristin Barton observes that this gag highlights how Tobias's characterization humorously subverts racial stereotypes by presenting himself as a black man.

== Reception ==
=== Viewers ===
In the United States, the episode was watched by 5.62 million viewers on its original broadcast. It received a 2.0% share among adults between the ages of 18 and 49, meaning that it was seen by 2% of all households in that demographic. It marked a decrease in viewership from the previous episode, "Sad Sack", which had earned a 2.3% rating and drew in 6.28 million viewers. It remained the season's lowest rated until two episodes later with "Queen for a Day, which only obtained 5.20 million viewers and a 1.9 rating.

=== Critical reception ===
In 2019, Brian Tallerico from Vulture ranked the episode as the seventh best of the whole series, positively noting the many humorous gags and ending scene of Lucille attacking a blue-painted Tobias. The A.V. Club writer Noel Murray praised the episode, comparing its misconceptions to the plot of a Three's Company episode and stating that it works because of its overall scope. Angie Errigo of Empire, in her review of the second season, highlighted the scenes at the Bluth company Christmas party as one of her favorite aspects of the season. Critic Andy Downing of Columbus Monthly described the episode—particularly the karaoke scene—as "pure comic genius". Daniel Shepard, founder of the animation studio Cartuna, stated in an interview that "Afternoon Delight" was his favorite episode of Arrested Development, highlighting the scene of Lucille making a seemingly racist comment that is, in actuality, about Tobias colored in blue paint.

The episode has appeared on several lists detailing the greatest Christmas-themed episodes of television. LaToya Ferguson of The Guardian placed it on her list, noting its subversion of usual Christmas episode motifs, and labeling it as one of Arrested Development's best. Variety writer Jacob Bryant also included it on his list of the best Christmas television episodes, highlighting the incestueus themes of Michael and Maeby's rendition of "Afternoon Delight" and the sexual harassment speech delivered by Gob. Shannon Carlin of Bustle positively described the episode as "cringeworthy" in her list.
