= Sad Sack (Arrested Development) =

- Arrested Development episode
- Barry Zuckerkorn (Henry Winkler) holds up an image of what was originally presumed to be the Iraqi countryside, informing everyone that its actually a photograph of testicles.
- Episode no.: Season 2 Episode 5
- Directed by: Peter Lauer
- Written by: Barbie Adler
- Cinematography by: Greg Harrington
- Editing by: Robert Bramwell
- Production code: 2AJD05
- Original air date: December 12, 2004
- Running time: 22 minutes

Guest appearances
- Henry Winkler as Barry Zuckerkorn; John Michael Higgins as Wayne Jarvis; Justin Grant Wade as Steve Holt; John Beard as himself

Episode chronology
← Previous "Good Grief"	Next → "Afternoon Delight"
- Arrested Development season 2

"Sad Sack" is the fifth episode of the second season of the American television satirical sitcom Arrested Development. It was written by supervising producer Barbie Adler and directed by Peter Lauer. It originally aired on the Fox Network on December 12, 2004.

The series, narrated by Ron Howard, follows the Bluths, a formerly wealthy, dysfunctional family, who made their money from property development. In the episode, George Sr. is concerned about the romance growing between Oscar and Lucille, and the prosecutor turns up new evidence supporting the Bluth's treason charge. Concurrently, George Michael gets glasses at the advice of Michael, and Maeby convinces her crush, Steve, that her mother Lindsay is transgender.

The episode's title references the scrotum—which is heavily utilized throughout the episode—and series creator Mitchell Hurwitz later expressed that he would format the episode's discussion around Tobias's testicles differently if it was made later in the show's run. Henry Winkler, John Michael Higgins, Justin Grant Wade, and John Beard appear as guest stars.

The episode was watched by 6.28 million viewers during its original broadcast and was mostly reviewed positively by critics. It received a nomination at the 57th Primetime Emmy Awards. Several critics and scholars have analyzed the episode since its release.

== Plot ==
George Michael (Michael Cera) reports to his father, Michael (Jason Bateman), that he got a B− on his last math test, and he reports some minor issues with his seeing, so Michael decides to get him glasses. Tobias (David Cross), Michael's brother-in-law, announces that he's heading off for the gym, which makes his wife Lindsay (Portia de Rossi) paranoid that he will have an affair after building his body. Maeby's (Alia Shawkat) attempts to get closer to her schoolmate Steve Holt (Justin Grant Wade) are thwarted after Lindsay, her mother, develops a crush on him. The family's patriarch George Sr. (Jeffrey Tambor) tells Michael he only came back to the family following his arrest to see if his wife Lucille (Jessica Walter) is in love with him or his twin brother Oscar (Tambor). Michael meets with the new prosecutor, Wayne Jarvis (John Michael Higgins), who offers Michael immunity if he hands over George Sr.

Buster (Tony Hale) can't scale a wall that he needs to climb to pass in the army, so he tries to convince his brother Gob (Will Arnett) to be a motivator for him. Lindsay decides to aggressively come on to Steve Holt, but Maeby sabotages that by telling Steve that Lindsay is actually her transgender father, which only furthers Steve's interest in Lindsay. Wayne reveals to Michael that they tapped into the Bluth Company email server, found satellite images of what they believe is the Iraqi countryside, and now speculate that George Sr. was building over WMD bunkers to hide them. George Sr., wearing a wig in order to look like Oscar, asks Lucille if she loves him, and subsequently returns to the attic when she answers yes.

The photos that Wayne Jarvis obtained finally make their way to the public and are seen by several branches of government, leading Buster's army division to leave for combat without him, so Gob inspires him to finally scale the wall. Upon overhearing Maeby tell George Michael about her own crush on Steve Holt, Lindsay decides to step away from Steve. Michael has his meeting with Wayne Jarvis, where Wayne threatens him with the Iraqi photos, but attorney Barry Zuckerkorn (Henry Winkler), seeing the photos for the first time, realizes that they are actually a close-up of a human scrotum. The picture was of Tobias' testicles, which he inadvertently photographed and emailed to the company while playing around with his new cell phone. George Michael complains about his vision with the glasses on, and Michael accepts that his son doesn't need glasses.

== Production ==
"Sad Sack" was directed by Peter Lauer and written by supervising producer Barbie Adler. It was the fifth episode of the season to be filmed. The title of the episode references the human scrotum, which is utilized heavily in the episode, through an innuendo. Guest stars in the episode include Henry Winkler and John Michael Higgins as Barry Zuckerkorn and Wayne Jarvis, respectively.

Series creator Mitchell Hurwitz noted that the episode's format was evidence of how the series has changed between seasons; in the episode, Tobias's photograph of his testicles is used as a throwaway gag at the end, while Hurwitz feels he would take more time to work on the storyline around the testicles photograph if the episode came out later in its run. Portia de Rossi stated that her naivety in the episode was different than what she was used to as an actress, given that she would most often play "strait-laced" and conventional characters.

"Sad Sack" was first released on home video in the United States on October 11, 2005, in the Complete Second Season DVD box set.

== Themes and analysis ==
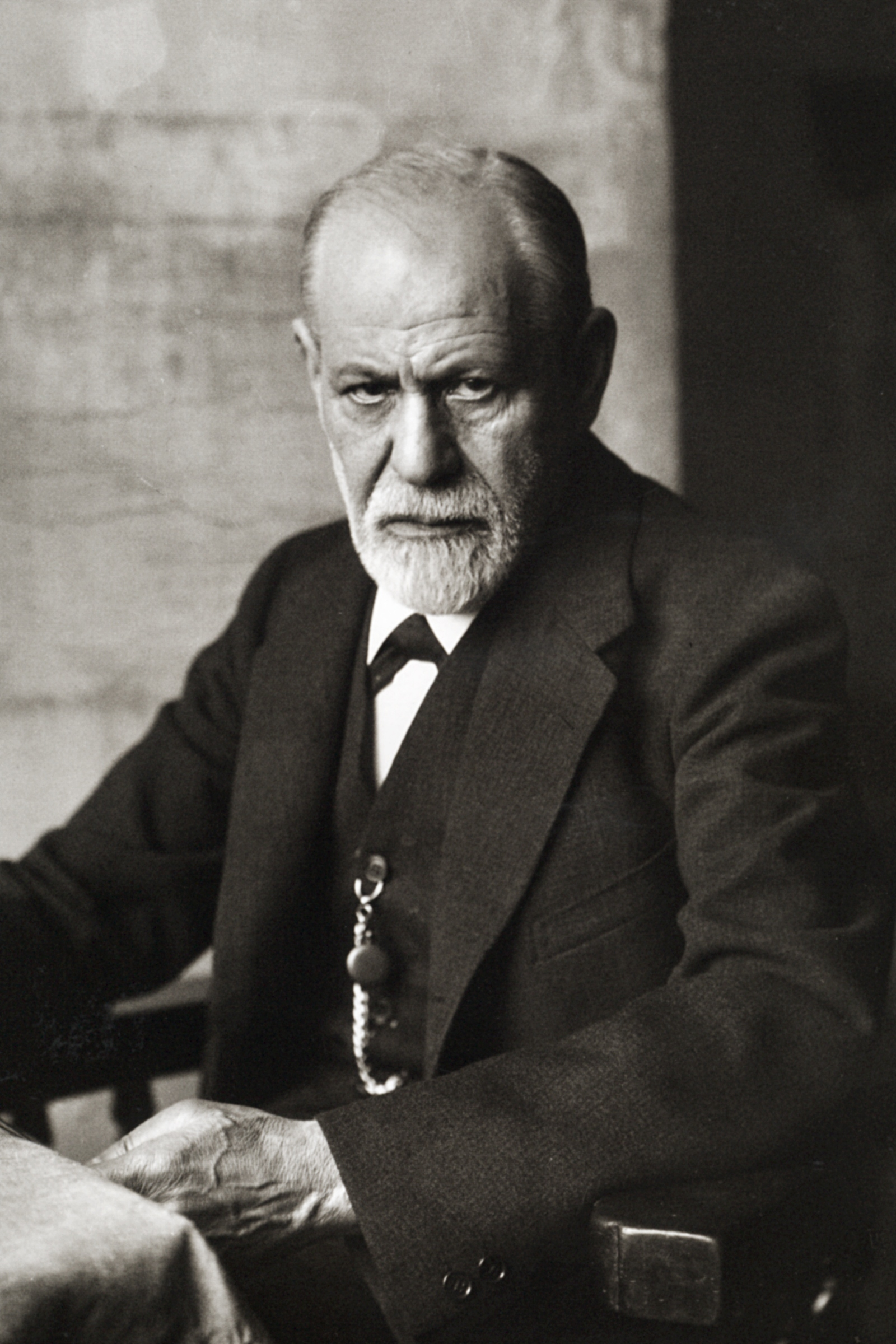
Aspects of "Sad Sack" have been compared to the notions of neurologist Sigmund Freud (pictured).

Author William Irwin notes that the episode initially presents multiple theories about what the supposed image of the Iraqi countryside might reveal about George Sr.'s innocence, even if no evidence supporting such claims is provided. This supports the motif that seeking information beyond what is explicitly presented can significantly alter one's understanding of a situation—an approach many people will reject in favor of relying solely on the available facts. Irwin also argues that the episode challenges philosopher Thomas Kuhn's belief that there is no "ultimate truth" in relation to theories. While Kuhn believed that a single, undisputed fact does not influence belief in a theory, the episode presents Tobias taking a photograph of his testicles, allowing the audience to clearly distinguish which theories are correct and which are not. The episode also continues the subtle gag of Buster finding joy in being included in the family's physical fights; he thanks Gob for punching him in the gut and encouraging him to be more adventurous, somehow equating violence with affection in a way that makes him feel accepted.

Wearing glasses that obscure his vision, George Michael, who had unintentionally seen Tobias's testicles when the two were previously living together, takes the role of the opposite of a privileged knower when it comes to discerning what the photograph is actually of, as suggested by Irwin. Critic Asawin Suebsaeng likened the testicles photograph to an incident of American general Colin Powell presenting potentially questionable evidence to the United Nations, noting that the absurd humor around the photograph is not as outlandish when compared to the incident. Neurologist Sigmund Freud's assertion that most misreadings stem from the subversion of the audience's expectations is reflected in the episode, as suggested by Irwin; this is seen when Lindsay fails to grasp the meaning of a shirt she is given that reads "Shèmale".

== Reception ==
=== Viewers ===
In the United States, the episode was watched by 6.28 million viewers during its original broadcast on December 12, 2004. It received a 2.3% share among adults between the ages of 18 and 49, meaning that it was seen by 2.3% of all households in that demographic. It marked an decrease in viewership from the previous episode, "Good Grief", which had earned a 2.4% rating and drew in 6.66 million viewers.

=== Critical reception ===
The A.V. Club writer Noel Murray wrote positively of "Sad Sack", asserting that it was not as strong as earlier episodes of the season, but found the episode's much more straightforward political commentary to be amusing. Murray critically notes the episode's stereotypical portrayal of drag culture as simply men or women wearing clothes of the opposite gender. In 2019, Brian Tallerico from Vulture ranked the episode 35th in his list ranking every episode of the series, critiquing it for being when the season "[slows] down" in terms of quality, but highlighting a humorous line from Maeby about how her school got a half day off following the discovery of WMDs in Iraq.

Joe George of y!entertainment listed it as one of the series' "episodes you'll wanna rewatch", noting that "Sad Sack" differentiates the series from other sitcoms through its mocking of the Bush administration with absurdist humor. Michael Cera called the episode—particularly the "silly" plot revolving around Tobias' testicles—one of his favorites from the series. The Atlantic's Albert Ching highlighted the episode's title—a pun on the human scrotum—as one of the series' best "infuriatingly clever" gags.

=== Accolades ===
For writing "Sad Sack", Barbie Adler was nominated for Outstanding Writing for a Comedy Series at the 57th Primetime Emmy Awards; the episode ultimately lost to "Righteous Brothers", another episode of Arrested Development.
