= Barbara Ann Wilcox =

American transgender woman (1912–1962)

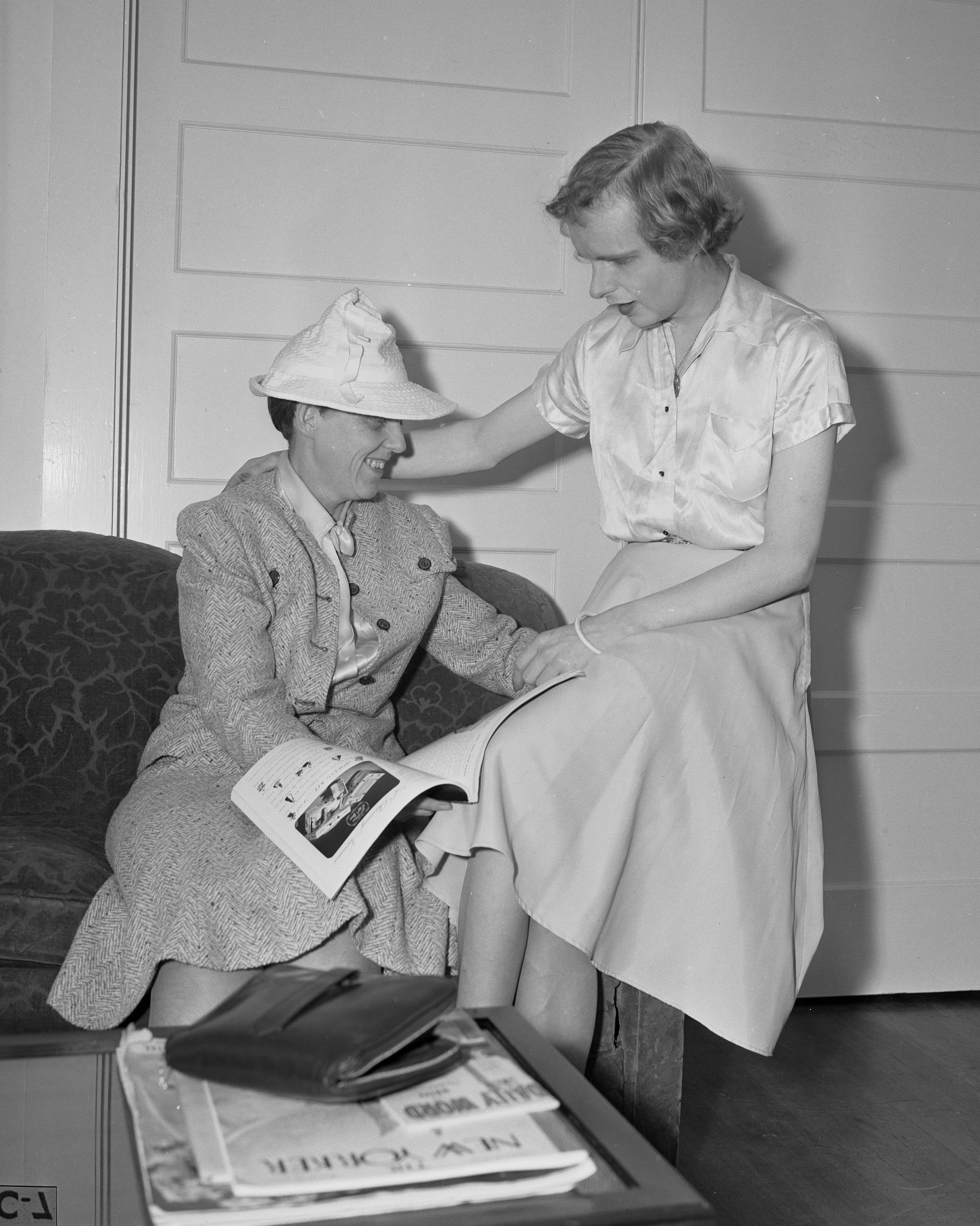
- Richards (right) and her partner in Los Angeles in 1941
- Born: Edward Price Richards; April 1, 1912; Salem, Massachusetts, U.S.
- Died: September 9, 1962 (aged 50); Martinez, California, U.S.
- Other name: Barbara Ann Richards
- Known for: Successfully changing her legal name to her chosen name
- Spouse: Richard Wilcox (m. 1940; ann. 1941)

Barbara Ann Wilcox (April 1, 1912 – September 9, 1962), born Edward Price Richards and known for a time as Barbara Ann Richards, was an American transgender woman who is known for her successful 1941 petition to change her legal name to her chosen name, which attracted widespread media attention as one of the earliest cases on the legal status of transgender people.

== Early life and education ==
Richards was born on April 1, 1912, to an affluent family in Salem, Massachusetts. When she was five, she was hospitalized for several months with spinal meningitis, which physically weakened her. Throughout her early childhood, she felt constrained by masculine expectations from her father and schoolmates. After her parents separated when she was 13, she moved with her mother to Los Angeles, where she started to enjoy school more.

She enrolled at Pomona College in Claremont, California, in 1931, but dropped out after one year. She tried out several occupations before settling on interior design.

== Transition and legal case ==
In 1940, Richards met Richard Wilcox, a transgender man, at a party, and asked him to marry her later that same day; he accepted. In October, she went to register for the Selective Service System, but was classified as unfit for military service and denied.

In 1941, she filed a legal petition with the Los Angeles County Superior Court to change her name to Barbara, effectively recognizing her as female. She minimized the fact that she was going through feminizing hormone therapy, instead portraying her transition as a mysterious natural occurrence. Her case generated widespread interest from national media outlets, which viewed it largely as a peculiar curiosity and emphasized its shock value.

When Richards's marriage to Wilcox became public during her case, she told reporters she would have it annulled, which she did after she won.

== Later life, death, and legacy ==
For the rest of her life, Richards adopted a quieter profile. She stayed together with Wilcox and their cat, and sometime before 1949, she married him again under their changed gender roles, taking his last name. In 1948, the couple purchased land in Martinez, California, and moved there to co-own a plant nursery. She received numerous letters from others who identified with her experience. In 1956, she underwent gender affirming surgery. She died on September 9, 1962.
