= Porn studies =

Academic study of pornography

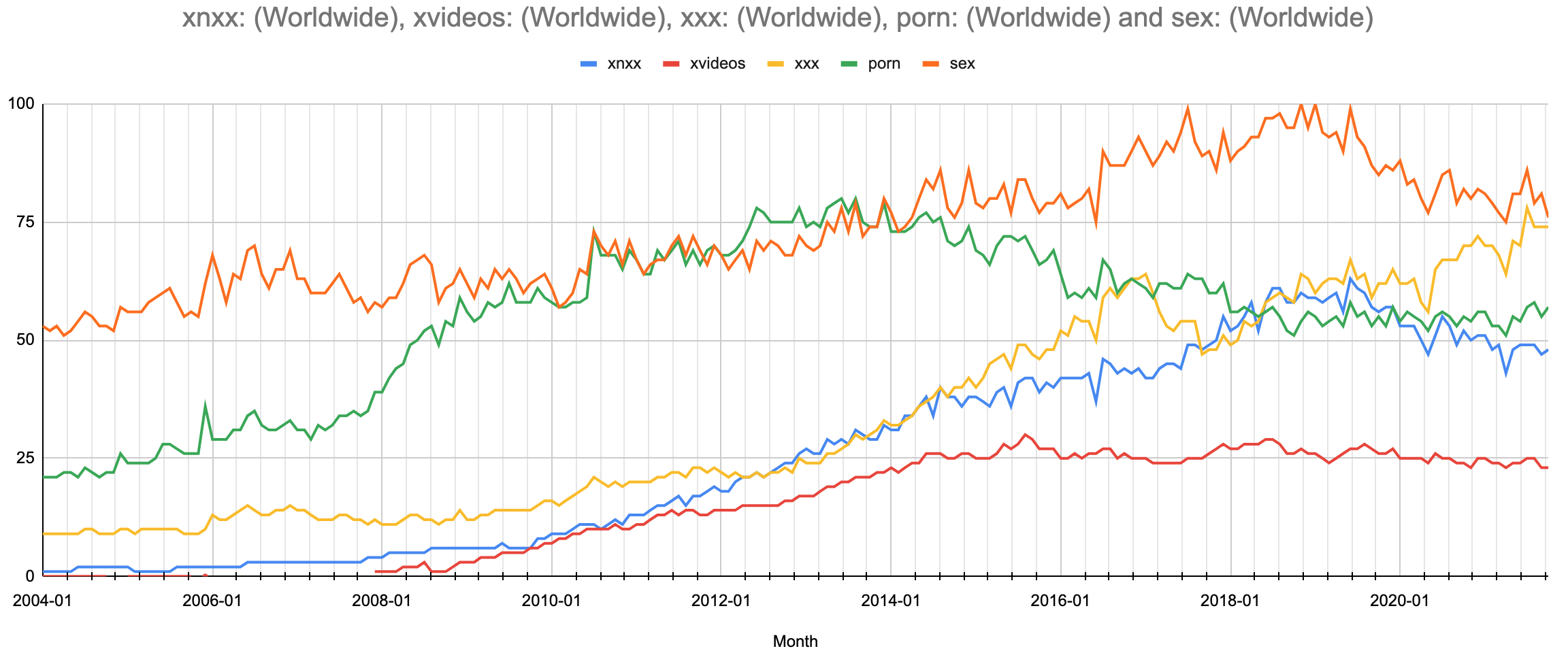
Top Keywords Searched Online in Pornography

Porn studies is the critical academic study of pornography and its associated industry, typically in the broader rubric of the field of sexuality studies. Porn studies takes as its object of research pornography itself — its visual artefacts, cultural role, controversies, and influence on the public — as well as the manner in which pornography is researched. The development of porn studies as a field of academia has been driven by the publication of the same name.

== Subjects ==
Areas and themes that scholars of porn studies, as a field, may focus on include: gay pornography and how it reproduces idealized pictures of masculinity, the uses of pornographic comics by Japanese women, the proliferation of amateur porn sparked by the Pamela Anderson and Tommy Lee video, interraciality in the porn industry, and more.

The field of porn studies situates itself in the broader field of critical studies. In doing so, it aims to "unpack what is at stake in the construction of particular views and practices... draw[ing] on insights from disciplines that acknowledge the complexity of culture and are aware of the shifts and continuities in the ways that sex and media are constructed historically." The critical approach includes an enquiry into the types of theoretical tools suggested by different forms of analysis, and how the questions one asks influence the research that is produced.

=== Studies ===
A Danish study showed that the availability of pornography reduces the incidents of at least some sexual crimes.

A 2009 study found that often perceived link between pornography and sexual violence was non-existent.

In 2010, a study found that men who watch pornography were more likely to be dissatisfied with their sex lives, although the reverse was true for women; heterosexual couples who watch pornography together were more likely to report higher levels of sexual satisfaction and dedication than those who viewed it alone.

A 2016 study found that those who regularly watch pornography are more likely to divorce, although the study did not determine if viewing pornography was a cause for the divorce or a symptom of other problems.

== Theoretical foundations ==
The philosophical foundation of the discipline porn studies is social constructivism. Thus, scholars of porn studies are not as interested in empirical questions about the effects of pornography on society — which traditionally cover issues like the links between the consumption of pornography and undesired behavioral and social outcomes; whether or not pornography is a public health problem; or whether pornography may have positive social benefits — but instead on questions surrounding how norms shape what is actually researched.

This approach to enquiry is opposed to positivist approaches in social science which "obscures the subjective, ideological and normative dimension of scientific paradigms."

== Criticism ==
Scholars of porn studies may encounter opposition from college and university administrators who are concerned about the consequences of exposing students to potentially obscene material in a typical course. Such concerns include the age of consent of the students viewing the material, and potential legal ramifications. Critics of violence in hardcore pornography have also raised objections to the discipline as a whole for its alleged role in perpetuating the damaging effects of porn.

== See also ==
- Sexology
