= Porn Studies (journal) =

Quarterly academic journal

- Cover of Volume 10, Issue 4
- Discipline: Sexology
- Language: English
- Edited by: Feona Attwood, Clarissa Smith

Publication details
- History: 2014–present
- Publisher: Routledge (United Kingdom)
- Frequency: Quarterly

Standard abbreviations
- ISO 4: Porn Stud.

Indexing
- ISSN: 2326-8743 (print); 2326-8751 (web)
- LCCN: 2013200630
- OCLC no.: 828410289

Links
- Journal homepage; Online access; Online archive

Porn Studies is a quarterly peer-reviewed academic journal covering the study of pornography. It is published by Routledge and was established in 2014. The editors-in-chief are Feona Attwood (Middlesex University), John Mercer (Birmingham City University), and Clarissa Smith (University of Sunderland).

In a call for papers, the editors described the journal as "the first dedicated, international, peer-reviewed journal to critically explore those cultural products and services designated as pornographic".

== Reception and review ==
Writing in The Guardian, John Dugdale considered the journal's appearance to be an implicit criticism of cultural studies' failure to investigate pornography, a reflection of the dispute in second-wave feminism between supporters and opponents of pornography. The newspaper associated the editors with the former position, as for example represented by Angela Carter.

The journal's establishment was criticized by anti-pornography campaigners. Gail Dines, a leading anti-pornography activist, compared Attwood and Smith to "climate change deniers" and "cheerleaders for the industry".

Lily Rothman of Time magazine commented that "anyone looking for titillation is likely to be disappointed. (Unless what turns you on is sociological analysis, in which case—it's your lucky day.)" According to Alexis Madrigal of The Atlantic, "the mere fact of its existence, which became public in mid-2013, was occasion for a media event. But the journal's articles are serious articulations of the intersection between the concerns of media studies and those of pornography. Porn Studies is not a joke, though it seems to provide everyone with some relief to treat it as one."
