= Switch Hitter =

- Arrested Development episode
- A disguised George Sr. (left) speaks with Michael (right) at the game
- Episode no.: Season 2 Episode 7
- Directed by: Paul Feig
- Story by: Courtney Lilly
- Teleplay by: Barbie Adler
- Cinematography by: Greg Harrington
- Editing by: Robert Bramwell
- Production code: 2AJD07
- Original air date: January 16, 2005
- Running time: 22 minutes

Guest appearances
- Ed Begley Jr. as Stan Sitwell; Jeff Garlin as Mort Meyers; Mo Collins as Starla; Mae Whitman as Ann Veal; J. K. Simmons as General Anderson

Episode chronology
← Previous "Afternoon Delight"	Next → "Queen for a Day"
- Arrested Development season 2

"Switch Hitter" is the seventh episode of the second season of the American television satirical sitcom Arrested Development. It was written by supervising producer Barbie Adler from a story by Courtney Lilly, and directed by Paul Feig. It originally aired on the Fox Network in the United States on January 16, 2005.

The series, narrated by Ron Howard, follows the Bluths, a formerly wealthy, dysfunctional family, who made their money from property development. In the episode, Gob goes to work for the Bluth Company's main competitor, Stan Sitwell, whose team is up against the Bluths at a softball game. George Sr. thinks the hiring is a ploy to get an advantage for the game, and he tries to control the game—and the company—while confined to the attic. Meanwhile, Maeby cons her way into a job at a film studio, and Lucille tries to get Buster out of his army duty.

The scene of Stan getting his eyebrow stuck to Gob's shirt was unscripted and resulted in Will Arnett and Ed Begley Jr. laughing immediately after the cameras cut. The Office star Craig Robinson made a cameo appearance in the episode, one of the earliest roles of his career

The episode received mostly positive reviews from critics and has been included in lists detailing the best episodes of Arrested Development. Since its release, its themes have been analyzed by critics and scholars.

== Plot ==
Michael Bluth (Jason Bateman) converses with his brother Gob (Will Arnett) about their upcoming meeting with Stan Sitwell (Ed Begley Jr.), the failing Bluth Company's biggest competitor. Gob notes the meeting is suspiciously taking place before the Bluths play Stan's company in softball, which Michael shrugs off as a coincidence. Michael's brother-in-law Tobias (David Cross) reveals that he has auditioned for a role in a feature film, and brings his daughter Maeby (Alia Shawkat) with him to help prepare. The family's matriarch, Lucille (Jessica Walter), walks in, upset at the prospect that her son Buster (Tony Hale) is being sent off to war, vowing to get him back.

Stan comes for the meeting and suggests a co-venture between their companies, which Michael agrees to, secretly going up to the attic where he is harboring his fugitive father, George Sr. (Tambor), to run the plan by him. George Sr. shoots down the idea, believing it to be a plan to ruin the Bluth Company's performance at the softball game; concurrently, Stan hires Gob to work for his company. Gob comes to request his old job back at the Bluth Company, but Michael, knowing how lazy Gob is, agrees to help him with his workload at Stan's company. While Tobias auditions, Maeby cons her way into a job at the film's production company by lying about her age, forcing her interns to do her schoolwork for her, and using her title to get Tobias the role.

Stan comes to Gob, suggesting the two of them play catch after work to bond, overwhelming Gob, who is not used to being around caring authority figures, motivating him to play well for Stan. Michael speaks with George Sr., who tells him that the company needs Gob back on the softball team, and so Michael tells Gob to purposefully play badly for Stan's team. Lucille speaks with an army general to get Buster out of duty, and persuades him to put Buster into U.S.O. training instead. At the game, both the Bluth Company and Stan's team tied; Stan talks to Gob about his performance, telling him that it doesn't matter if they win or not, and the two hug. Feeling someone had finally believed in him, Gob decides to play well, and he and Michael soon realize the umpire is George Sr. in disguise, telling Michael that he is proud of him, and also accepting that their team has lost for the first time.

== Production ==
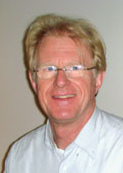
Ed Begley, Jr. (pictured) and Will Arnett had an unscripted moment in "Switch Hitter".

"Switch Hitter" was directed by Paul Feig. It was written as a teleplay by supervising producer Barbie Adler, adapted from a story by Courtney Lilly. It was Adler's fourth writing credit for the series. It was the seventh episode of the ordered season to be filmed.

During Stan and Gob's hugging scene, an unscripted moment occurred where one of Stan's glued-on eyebrows stuck to Gob's wardrobe. Arnett and Ed had to act professionally and finish the take as directed, but both started laughing immediately after the filming ended. The episode marks the beginning of the long-running storyline about Maeby becoming a movie executive. Craig Robinson, before he became popular with his role on The Office, made a minor guest appearance in the episode as a studio security guard, which was one of his earliest roles as an actor. During Maeby's first visit to Tantamount Studios, a poster can be seen for the fictional film "Homeless Dad", which was produced in a previous episode and is referenced in other subsequent episodes. Jason Tinero, who portrayed young Buster, was confused when he was told to shoot a fake magazine cover opposite Jessica Walter, particularly because of the sailor outfit he was forced to wear. However, once he saw Walter, he realized the humor in the photoshoot. It wasn't until Tinero watched the episode that he fully understood the joke.

"Switch Hitter" was first released on home video in the United States on October 11, 2005, in the Complete Second Season DVD box set. In 2013, a soundtrack compiling every song from the first four seasons of the series entitled "At Long Last...Music and Songs From Arrested Development" was released, including the song "Temocil" from the episode; the song was performed by Cross, de Rossi, and Danielle Cipolla.

== Themes and analysis ==
The episode emphasizes George Sr.'s—and, by extension, the Bluth Company's —harsh business practices, which are often at the expense of helping them profit. Author Edwin Demper notes this occurring when George Sr. turns down Michael's suggestion to rename their poorly titled city; George Sr., after saying no to the idea, mumbles, "That was a hard one to shoot down". Demper also uses the episode to prove his point that a common moral of Arrested Development is that good behavior often goes unrewarded. While Michael spends the majority of the series being a good-natured person, trying to steer his family, particularly George Sr., away from immorality, Maeby, someone with no work ethic, is able to swindle her way into becoming a successful movie executive with no consequences whatsoever. Critic Joe George notes that the episode spotlights George Sr.'s pitting of Gob and Michael together, a plot point commonly seen throughout the series' run.

A common theme of the series, including "Switch Hitter", is the idea that the Bluth family is inherently incestuous, even if any incest isn't actually committed. This theme is on display during the episode's scene of Lucille sleeping with Oscar, her brother-in-law, which sets off a storyline spanning throughout the entire second season. The A.V. Club's Noel Murray agreed that the episode contained themes of incest, finding Buster's appearance on a magazine cover—reading "Why I Want To Marry My Mother"—and Michael saying he wants to be with George Michael's girlfriend Ann as examples of such.

The Bluths, despite living in luxury, feel adequate living in the company's disastrously-built model homes, which are known to have numerous safety violations and are not suitable for living; in the episode, Stan Sitwell mentions this, a rare event for the series, comparing the homes to a sinkhole, while George Michael, already used to these living conditions, optimistically likens the unsteadiness of the model homes to a salad dressing. Author Brett Gaul also shared a similar sentiment, finding the shoddy workmanship of the house—which is deliberately shown in the episode when the family repeatedly breaks pieces of furniture while trying to prove that the houses aren't poorly built—to be symbolic of how deceiving the family is, attempting to sell the unsafe homes to the public.

== Reception ==
=== Viewers ===
In the United States, the episode was watched by 5.78 million viewers during its original broadcast on January 16, 2005. It received a 2.1% share among adults between the ages of 18 and 49, meaning that it was seen by 2.1% of all households in that demographic. It marked an increase in viewership from the previous episode, "Afternoon Delight", which had earned a 2.0% rating and drew in 5.62 million viewers.

=== Critical reception ===
Murray praised the episode for beginning the storyline of Maeby becoming a film executive for its satire of the industry and for utilizing Maeby, who was left mainly unused throughout the second season. Murray found the other subplots to be inferior, but enjoyed that Lindsay, who also played a lesser role in season two, was given screen time. In 2019, Brian Tallerico from Vulture ranked the episode 52nd out of the whole series, giving it a mixed review. He felt it continued a trend of decreasing quality found in the middle of season two, asserting that the alopecia jokes grew stale quickly for him, but found a joke from Gob to be its sole highlight.

Tara Ariano of Cracked listed Lucille's "And a piece of toast" line as one of the 100 funniest television punchlines of all time. Yahoo Entertainment's Joe George praised "Switch Hitter", hailing it as one of the greatest episodes of Arrested Development. He found the softball game to produce many "great gags", particularly Ann knocking her opponents over. Brandon Stroud of Uproxx, in his list of the series' best sports-related episodes, called "Switch Hitter" its best episode to include the sport of softball. Stroud highlighted Ann's dialogue, a line about "candy beans", and Gob's chicken dance when on the outfield. MLB journalist Michael Clair praised the episode, listing it as one of the greatest baseball-themed episodes of television. He noted that, despite the series's more modern elements, it still adheres to the older television trope of a softball-themed episode.
