= Tranny =

Derogatory term for a transgender person

- Etymology: From English trannie
- Meaning: Transgender or transsexual people (pejorative)

Tranny (rarely spelled trannie) is a derogatory slur for a transgender person, often specifically a transgender woman.

During the early 2000s, there was some confusion and debate over whether tranny was a slur, an acceptable colloquial term, or a reappropriated term of unity and pride. By 2017, the term had been banned by several major media stylebooks and was considered hate speech by Facebook until 2025, when they made significant changes to moderation policy.

== Usage ==
Roz Kaveney wrote in The Guardian in 2010 that tranny had recently appeared to be undergoing reappropriation to be used with pride by trans activists, but "it didn't take", due in part to the word's continued use as a term of abuse. After using the slur in 2011, Lance Bass said he had thought the term was not a slur after having heard it used on RuPaul's Drag Race or Project Runway, but he apologized for using the slur after learning that it was not acceptable. GLAAD's 2011 Transgender Resource Page said the term is "usually considered offensive and/or defamatory to transgender people".

Singer-songwriter Justin Vivian Bond and writer Kate Bornstein, both transgender, have historically advocated for use of the term, with Bond saying in 2014 that banning the word does not eliminate transphobia but rather "steal[s] a joyous and hard-won identity from those of us who are and have been perfectly comfortable, if not delighted to be trannies". Bornstein claimed the word was used in the 1960s and 1970s in Sydney, Australia by trans people as "a name for the identity they shared", but said no one should think Bornstein was giving them permission to use the slur to describe anyone without first knowing the term they used for their gender identity. In Tranny: An Evidence-Based Review, Cristan Williams reviewed historic use of the slur and found the first published instance in 1983, originating among gay men. Williams expressed doubt that the word was popularized long before then.

In 2014, the Tranny Awards changed its name to the Transgender Erotica Awards, citing feedback from the "extended trans adult community" as a reason to stop using the term. In 2017, Facebook's anti-hate speech algorithms started blocking posts containing tranny, as well as the slur for lesbians dyke and the slur for homosexual men fag.

In December 2024, US congresswoman Nancy Mace used the slur both on social media and out loud with a bullhorn at the Capitol. She repeatedly used the slur during the 5 February 2025 House Oversight and Government Reform Committee hearing, despite being criticized for it by the panel's ranking member.

== Regional variations ==
Pre-internet and in the early years of the internet in Australia, particularly in Sydney and Melbourne, the term was used as an informal in-group identifier amongst people who would now use the term trans or transgender. The term did not have the strong negative connotations that it has today.
