= Transgender pornography =

Pornography genre

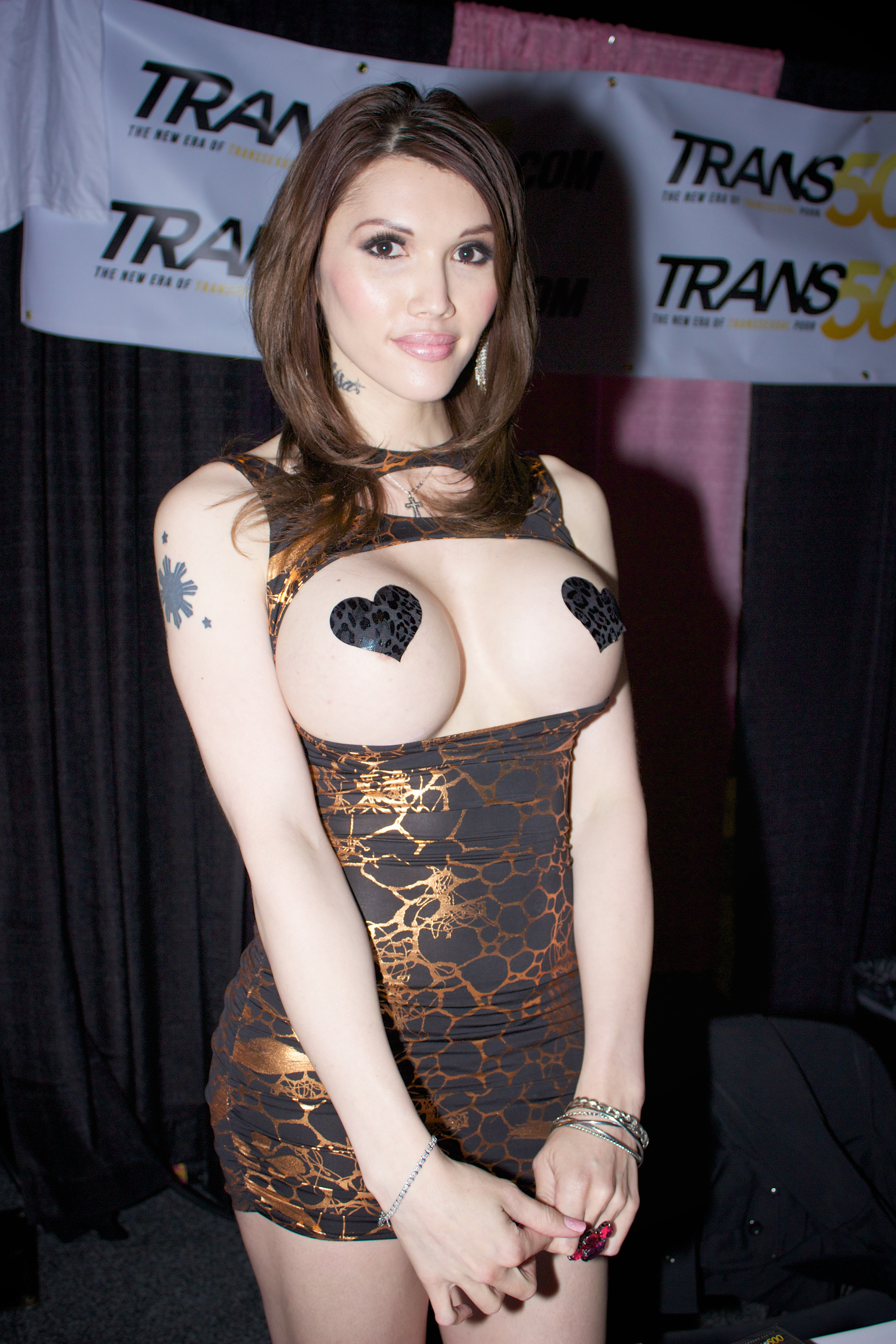
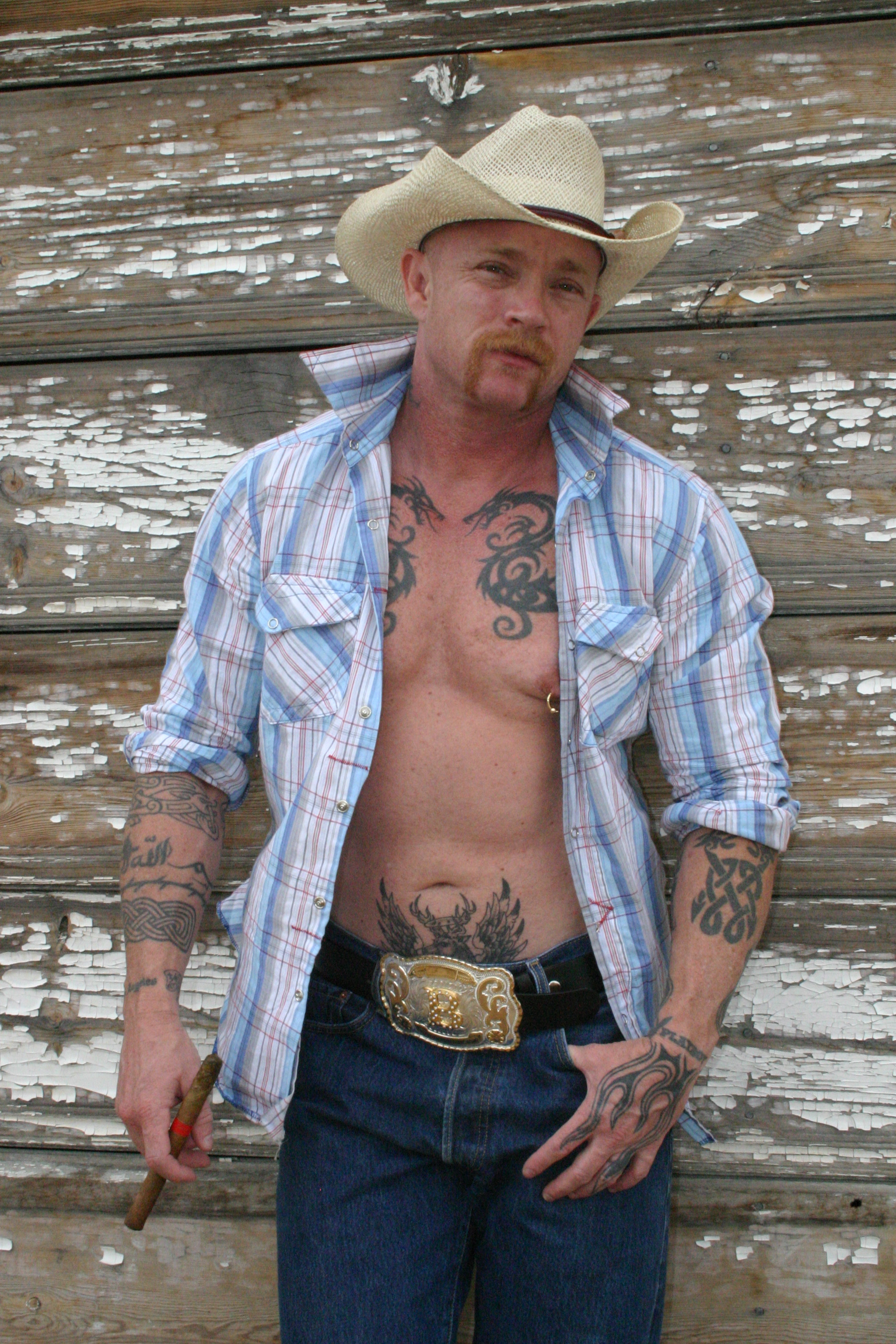
Eva Lin and Buck Angel, two notable transgender pornographic actors

Transgender pornography is a genre of pornography featuring transsexual or transgender actors. The majority of the genre features trans women, and trans men are sometimes featured. Trans women are most often featured with male partners, but they are also featured with other women, both transgender and cisgender.

== Terminology ==
In the 2010s, it was common in transgender pornography to use terms that are generally regarded as pejorative slurs in the trans community, such as "chicks with dicks", "trannies", or "shemales". Transgender pornographic actress Wendy Williams said she disagreed with activists who thought these sorts of terms are slurs, as these words were originally "used so the laymen person could understand the products they were buying in porn". In 2017, a major trans porn site changed its name from ShemaleYum to GroobyGirls and announced it would no longer use terms that are seen as stigmatizing.

Trans women in pornography are sometimes called "tgirls", the t standing for transgender or transsexual.

== Awards ==
AVN Award for Transgender Performer of the Year is one of the major industry awards for actors in the genre. Transgender Erotica Awards (formerly Tranny Awards) is the other major award. The Feminist Porn Awards has also awarded trans and genderqueer performers for expanding the boundaries of the genre, with early awards going to Jiz Lee and Drew Deveaux.

== Past and modern history ==
Trans people have long been represented in North American erotic media, often in pieces created by cisgender people that cater to cisgender fantasies. Relatedly, cross-dressing fantasies originating in the BDSM community have been a topic since at least the 1950s in North American print erotica. Caroline "Tula" Cossey became Playboy's first openly trans model after being outed during her career.^{:275-276}

As commercial pornographic videos grew popular during the 1980s, trans porn likewise grew as a genre. This became one of the few media types to regularly employ trans performers and represent trans women, although often this was restricted to white women with large breasts who had not undergone genital gender-affirming surgery. Works portrayed trans women as both the subject and object of desire.^{:277} Representations of "trans sexualities" were often labeled under the terms "she-male" or "travestie" (relatedly, "she-male" has also been used as a derogatory and fetishizing term to describe trans people).

Porn produced by and for trans people has been a growing genre since the 1990s.^{:277} The decreasing cost of filmmaking equipment and formation of politically-minded trans communities helped create a broader growth in trans filmmaking during the same period. Early directors of trans porn included Mirha-Soleil Ross, Stephanie Anne Lloyd, Les Nichols, and Chance Ryder, who produced films that expanded their intended gaze from only cisgender to also transgender. Other early directors include Christopher Lee, Hans Scheirl, Buck Angel, Morty Diamond, Cary Cronenwett, Tobaron Waxman, T-wood team, and Tobi Hill-Meyer.^{:277}

=== Influences on the genre ===
Trans pornography has been shaped by institutional pressures, especially the gatekeeping requirements that various medical establishments placed on trans people.^{:277} For instance, the DSM-5 criteria for receiving a gender dysphoric diagnosis required expressions of disgust and a need to change one's genitals. If trans people wanted to obtain medical support in these systems, they needed to avow very restrictive sexual feelings to their doctors.^{:277} This influence helped homogenize popular expressions of trans desire and masked many diverse, stigmatized forms of it.

Because representation of trans women was predominantly restricted to pornographic media for so long, many early trans activists were concerned about whether this was representation that would help the trans community gain tolerance, rights, and access to needed resources. Some tried to distance the trans community from its popular association with sex work and decidedly negative stereotypes like sexual deviancy.^{:278} Broader trends also shaped parts of the industry: in the U.S. during the 1980s and 1990s, there was a moral panic over art perceived as obscene or pornographic, which affected federal grants for artists, venues, and film festivals.

=== Representation and expansion ===
Lack of preservation and study of marginalized forms of trans porn has left gaps in understanding its history.^{:279-280} In 2017, Laura Horak stated that "gender variant media-making in Asia, Africa, Eastern Europe, and Central and South America has been woefully understudied in English-language scholarship." She could only find one English analysis of trans filmmaking across those geographies, on a Thai film. Commercial landscapes made it more likely that white cisgender men could create trans porn in the U.S. and Canada, but beginning in the 1990s, the creators of trans porn diversified. More trans people of color, as well as transmasculine and nonbinary people, were able to share works in the genre.^{:280}

Rising visibility of transmasculine people during the 2000s, including growing transmasculine representation in print erotica, helped popularize transmasculine porn. Angel helped initiate this subgenre, and studios like Crashpad, Good Vibrations, and Trannywood began to produce related work, alongside performers like Dex Hardlove, Billy Castro and James Darling. Transmasculine porn is notable for tending towards political art, with works showcasing new representation and gender politics.

Film festivals prioritizing trans art have also supported the cultural growth of trans porn. Counting Past 2, established in 1997 by Ross, was the first trans film festival. Later that year, Zachary I. Nataf and Annette Kennerley launched the five-day First International Transgender Film & Video Festival in London. Lee and Alex Austin also organized Tranny Fest: Transgender and Transgenre Cinema in San Francisco. YouTube also allowed many new trans and gender variant filmmakers to share their works with wide audiences, and the broader genre of trans filmmaking exploded in the 21st century. Finn Jackson Ballard concluded that by the 2010s, "queer porn, if not entering the mainstream, is certainly becoming an increasingly recognized phenomenon."

In 2025, the pornographic category became the second LGBTQ-related most viewed on Pornhub after the lesbian category, which some link to a rise in transphobia in the United States.

== Trans women ==
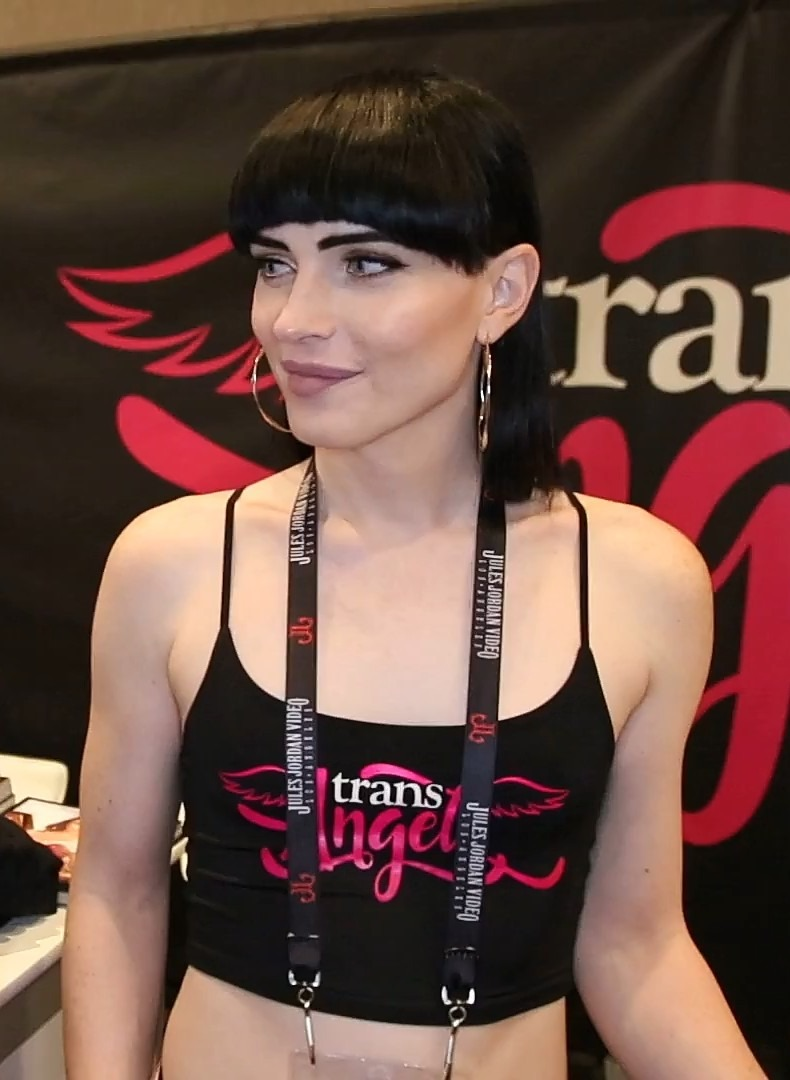
Pornographic film actress Natalie Mars

Viewers of pornography featuring trans women typically identify as heterosexual. Transgender porn has become one of the largest, most popular genres of porn among heterosexual males.

Data from RedTube, a pornographic video hosting site, indicated that as of 2016 and based on the frequency of online searches, trans porn was most popular in Brazil, Italy, Argentina, Russia and Spain; the United States ranked at 12th place, and within the US, trans porn searches were most common in Wyoming.

A spokesman for Evil Angel, a US porn production company, was quoted in 2015 as saying trans porn was the company's most profitable category, commanding premiums of about 20% more than other genres or scenes.

Trans pornographic actresses may be either sexually passive or active with their male co-stars. Some actresses, such as Danni Daniels, usually perform as a "top" or specialize in dominant roles.

== Trans men ==
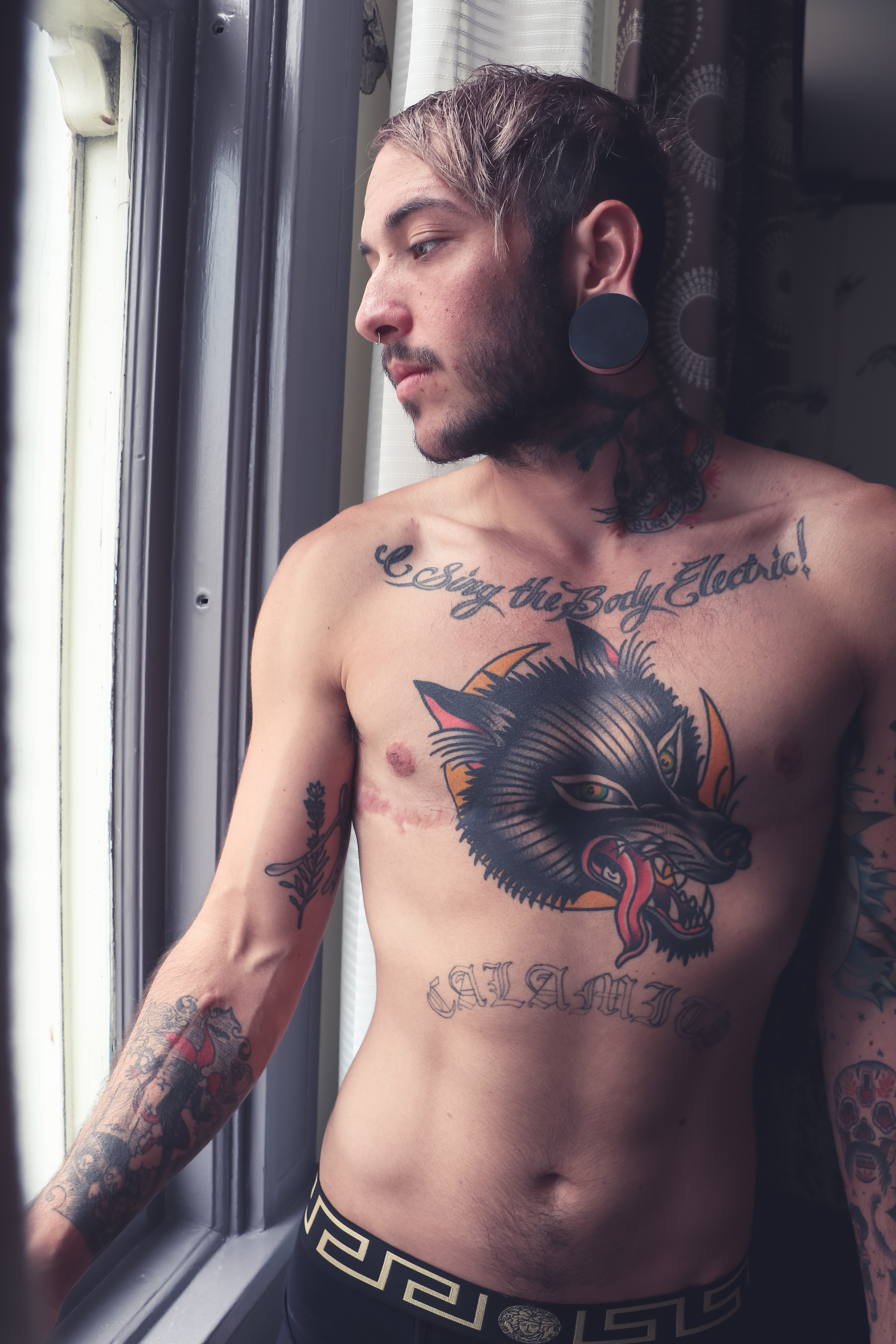
Pornographic film actor Viktor Belmont

In 2005, Titan Media released a film titled Cirque Noir starring Buck Angel, marking the first time a trans man had been featured in an all-male film produced by a company specializing in gay male porn.

Cyd St. Vincent founded "Bonus Hole Boys" in 2014, the first FTM gay porn company, in order to "show big-name gay porn stars having sex with trans men and loving it." The formula has found a following among both women and gay men, with the majority of the company's fan base being gay men. The gay male audience for FTM porn has become a growing niche as more gay men become exposed to the genre.

In January 2018, the major gay porn studio Raw Fuck Club (RFC), released a scene starring Cyd St. Vincent titled "Some Men Have Pussies", becoming one of the few major gay porn companies to feature transgender men. The scene was largely popular, but provoked some controversy. Buck Angel's "Cirque Noir" and Cyd St. Vincent's "Some Men Have Pussies" have been praised as "landmark roles" in the representation of trans men in gay porn, "whose magnitude cannot be understated."

As of 2019, gay trans man porn is still a relatively niche genre of pornography with few performers, but the market is growing each year as an audience develops for the genre.

== Perception ==
Psychologist David J. Ley wrote that the popularity of transgender porn may have various causes, including sexual fluidity and its novelty factor. Author J. Phillips wrote that the "phallic woman...challenges the fixity of our own sexual identity." Neuroscientist Ogi Ogas said that some straight men are interested in porn with trans women because the brain likes "different sexual cues in novel combinations" and that men seem to have a strong interest in penises regardless of sexual orientation. Jacob Engelberg writes about porn's potential as a "process that is affirming of transformational sexual potentialities, wherein bisexual and transgender possibilities might be forged".

Some in the LGBT community feel transgender pornography objectifies and degrades transgender people.

Others argue it can have positive effects. Trans actor Buck Angel said "I get letters daily from people thanking me about making them feel better about their bodies."

A 2024 study of Italian trans and nonbinary adults asked about their perceptions and consumption of pornography. Respondents said it was very hard to find representation of nonbinary people in pornography outside of amateur, ethical, and feminist porn. Many said that representation of trans identities was more respectful and casual in amateur porn than in mainstream porn, with one person describing trans identities being used as an "'itchy' element or as a plot twist" in mainstream porn. Many felt that the representation of transgender and nonbinary people in the porn they watched was a nice experience, providing pleasure, a sense of normalization, and an opportunity to compare and discover trans bodies. However, the representation on offer, especially in mainstream pornography, often provoked negative feelings and gender dysphoria. Common issues included the use of offensive terms, speech that invalidates identities, stereotypical representations of only certain types of trans people, and stereotyped sexual roles. Fat transgender, nonbinary, and genderqueer people are also underrepresented in the porn and sex industries.

== See also ==
- Sexual attraction to transgender people
- Shemale – Term primarily used in sex work
- Futanari – Japanese word and pornographic genre
- Femboy – Slang term used for a feminine male
- Transgender sex workers – Transgender people who work in the sex industry
- Transgender sexuality – Sexuality of transgender people
