= 8th Transgender Erotica Awards =

US adult entertainment industry award

- Date: March 6, 2016
- Site: Avalon Hollywood, California
- Hosted by: Jujubee

Highlights
- Best Film: Kaitlyn Gender (Trans500) and My TS Student (Transsensual) [Tie]
- Most awards: Domino Presley and Dicky Johnson (2 each)
- Most nominations: Kylie Maria (6)

The 8th Annual Transgender Erotica Awards was a pornographic awards event recognizing the best in transgender pornography from the previous year from 15 October 2014 to 15 November 2015. Pre-nominations opened on October 29, 2015, and the public at large was able to suggest nominees using an online form. Pre-nominations closed on December 6, 2015, with the nominees announced on January 4, 2016, on the theteashow.com website. The winners were announced during the awards on March 6, 2016. There were a total of 22 Award categories.

Two of the awards were open to fan voting after pre-nominations closed. These were the fan award which was open to all and Grooby Girl of the Year which was open to members of the Grooby Girls forums who met specific criteria regarding; a number of postings and a date to have been a member before.

== Winners and nominees ==
The nominations for the 8th Transgender Erotica Awards were announced online on January 4, 2016, and opened to fan voting on December 6, 2015, when pre-nominations closed online on the theteashow.com website. The winners were announced during the awards on March 6, 2016.

=== Awards ===
Winners are listed first, highlighted in boldface.

Best New Face	Best FTM New Face
**Natalie Mars**; Alexa Scout; Alicia Snow; Ava Keading; Diana Love; Emy Amethyst; Lilith Lovett; Luna Rose; Megan Snow; Oriana Frost; River Stark; Robbi Racks; Sasha Skyes; Taryn Empress; Tyra Alice	**Eddie Wood**; Memphis Bradley; Messyah Kyng; Oyle; Peter PinkPuss; Ryder Neumann; Sailor James
Best Hardcore Performer	Best Solo Model
**Jonelle Brooks**; Ashley Paleta; Athena Addams; Aubrey Kate; Foxxy; Honey Foxx; Jaquelin Braxton; Jesse Flores; Jessica Foxx; Jessy Dubai; Kelli Lox; Kylie Maria; Luna Rose; Morgan Bailey; Natassia Dreams; Nina Lawless; Sienna Grace; Stefani Special; Venus Lux; Yasmin Lee	**Domino Presley**; Angelina Torres; Aubrey Kate; Eva Paradis; Evie Elliott; Holly Parker; Honey Foxx; Kelli Lox; Kylie Maria; Luna Rose; Michelle Firestone; Penny Tyler; River Stark; Tasha Jones; Trixxy Von Tease; Tyra Scott
Best Non-US Performer	Best FTM Performer
**Miran** (Japan); Alexandra Vexx (Germany); Alicia Snow (UK); Angeles Cid (Argentina); Angelina Torres (Spain); Bianka Nascimento (Brazil); Bruna Butterfly (Brazil); Joanna Jet (UK); Jordan Jay (UK); Lexus Bradbury (UK); Liberty Harkness (UK); Lina Cavalli (Russia); Mia Maffia (UK); Nikki Montero (Chile); Red Vex (Poland)	**Dicky Johnson**; Bleu; Buck Angel; Chance Armstrong; Cyd St.Vincent; James Darling; Kipp Slinger
Best Scene	Best FTM Scene
**Yasmin Lee & Lucas Knight** – TS Seduction; Athena & Nefarious – Shemale.XXX; Aubrey Kate & Giovanni – The Tranny Bunch; Delia Delions & Kate England – Shemale Idol: The Auditions 6; Foxxy & Amarna Miller – TS Pussyhunters; Holly Parker, Nina Lawless, Brooke Zannell & Sami Price – Dirty Blonde Transsexuals; Holly Parker – Shemale Strokers; Jane Starr & Stefani Special – Trans 500; Jessica Fox & Tristan Matthews – TS Seduction; Jessy Dubai & Brock Avery – Transsensual; Jonelle Brooks & Chad Diamond – Hot For Transsexuals; Kylie Maria and Ramon – Trans 500; Luna Rose & Robert Axel in “Axel Rose” – Bobs Tgirls; Miran, Nicole Montero & Wolf Hudson – Shemale.XXX; Morgan Bailey and Robert Axel – Shemale.XXX; Nala & Soldier Boi – Black Shemale Hardcore; Penny Tyler & Tori Mayes – Transsexual Housewives of Hollywood; Stefani Special – Shemale Strokers; Tasha Jones & James Dickerson – Club Tasha; Tyra Scott, Riley Quinn & Christian – Pure TS; Vixxen Goddess & Connor McGuire – Transsensual	**Trixxy Von Tease & Dicky Johnson** - DickyJohnson.com; Eddie Wood & Parker Reed – Game Wars; James Darling & Venus Lux – FTM Fucker; Eddie Wood – The Squirting Man; Tasha Jones & Eddie Wood – Ms. Jones Seduction; Michelle Austin & Dicky Johnson – 50 Shades of A Tranny
Best DVD	Best DVD Director
**Kaitlyn Gender** (Trans500) and **My TS Student** (Transsensual) [Tie]; America’s Next Top Tranny 20 (GoodFellas); Black Tranny Whackers 29 (Mancini); Shemale Strokers 77 (Mancini); Hot For Transexuals (Evil Angel); Rogue Adventures #41 (Evil Angel); She-Male Idol: The Auditions #6 (Evil Angel); The Submissive Mixtape (TroubleFilms); The Tranny Bunch (Devils Film); Trans6uals (Grooby); Trans Guys Love Cock (FTM Fucker); Transsexual Housewives of Beverly Hills (Grooby); TS Beauties (Transsensual); TS Playground 13 (Evil Angel); Venus Lux Fantasies (Pulse Pictures)	**Joey Silvera**; Aiden Starr; Buddy Wood; Frank; Jamie French; Jay Sin; Jim Powers; Josh Stone; Nica Noelle; Sammy Mancini
Best Scene Producer	Best Photographer
**Jamie French**; Ariel X; Buddy Wood; Courtney Trouble; Damien Cain; Jack Flash; Josh Stone; Maitresse Madeline Marlowe; Michelle Austin; Nica Noelle; Sammy Mancini	**Josh Stone**; Ames Bexxx; Atomic Visuals; Blackula; Bob Maverick; Ernie Black; Frank; Jack Flash; Jamie French; Kalin; Kila Kali; Omar Wax; Radius Dark; Remy X
Best Solo Site	Best Internet Personality
**Venus-Lux**; TS Bailey Jay; Brittany St.Jordan; Eva Paradis XXX; TS Jamie French; TS Jesse; Jonelle Brooks; Korra Del Rio; Krissy 4u; Kylie Maria; TS Michelle; Natassia Dreams; Robbi Racks; Tasty Crona; Tiffany Starr; Trixxy Von Tease; TSFilpina; Tyra Scott XXX	**Becca Benz**; Bailey Jay; Buck Angel; Caramel Black; Eddie Wood; Emy Amethyst; Holly Parker; Kelly Klaymour; Mia Isabella; Natalie Mars; PornOCD; TransEthics; TS Madison
Ms Unique	Fan Choice Award
**Chelsea Marie**; Ada Black; Athena Addams; Brooke Zanell; Chelsea Poe; Crona Valentine; Delia TS; Eva Cassini; Jamie French; Krissy4u; Kennadie Havoc; Korra Del Rio; Kelly Clare; Michelle Austin; Treasure Barbie; Trixxy Von Tease; Wendy Williams	**Kylie Maria**
Best Non-TS Performer Female	Best Non-TS Performer Male
**Mona Wales**; Ava Devine; Daisy Ducati; Eliza Allure; Katie St.Ives; Magdalene St.Michaels; Mistress Kara; Nikki Delano	**Robert Axel**; Brock Avery; Chad Diamond; Christian; Geo; Lance Hart; Ramon; Ruckus; Soldier Boi; Will Havoc; Wolf Hudson
Grooby Girl of the Year	Bob's TGirl of the Year
**Ava Keading**	**Domino Presley**
Industry Professional Award	Transcendence Award
**Mark Kernes**	**Gia Darling**
Kinkiest T-Girl Domme	Trans500 Model of the Year
**Nina Lawless**	**Kylie Maria**
Shemale Strokers Model of the Year	Lifetime Achievement Award
**Sasha Skyes**	**The Commander**; **Ed Hunter**; **TS Madison**
