= Morty Diamond =

American filmmaker and performer

- Education: San Francisco State University
- Occupations: Filmmaker (Writer, Producer, Director), Artist, Performer

Morty Diamond is a filmmaker, artist, performer, and writer from the United States who has worked alongside the LGBT community for over 14 years. Diamond has written and edited three books, which all focus on transgender topics, and has also made two films which explore LGBT subjects.

Diamond was awarded the 2012-2013 Social Science Fellowship at the University of California, Berkeley as an opportunity to study the effects of San Francisco's changing public health care system on transgender groups and individuals. He received his masters of social work from San Francisco State University.

== Career ==
=== Works ===
Diamond is the author and/or editor of three books: From the Inside Out: Radical Gender Transformation, FTM and Beyond (2004), Trans/Love: Radical Sex, Love & Relationships Beyond the Gender Binary (2011), and Gendered Hearts: Transgendered, Transsexual, and Gender Variant Writers on Sex, Love, and Relationships (2010). Diamond has directed two LGBT films, TrannyFags (2003) and Trans Entities: The Nasty Love of Papí and Wil (2007), and starred as "Syd" in the film Open (2010) directed by Jake Yuzna. He also has a production company, Morty Diamond Productions.

Trans Entities: The Nasty Love of Papí and Wil is a pornographic film which explores the sexual relationship between two trans people, the main characters reflecting this. In their 2014 article "On the Affective Force of "Nasty Love", Eliza Steinbock had written that "It consists of four parts interview-driven discussions on sex and gender expression, and three parts steamy, intimate, creative sex." Discussing the filmic work of Diamond, Bobby Noble outlined the reoccurring themes present in his work. "Diamond's work is interesting not only for its depictions of social and sexual bodies, but also for the way those bodies are located in historical geographies that have been naturalized into contemporary social space." Laura Horak lists Diamond as an important early trans porn filmmaker, along with artists like Mirha-Soleil Ross, Christopher Lee, Stephanie Anne Lloyd, Buck Angel, and Cary Cronenwett.

In 2005, Diamond took on the role of artistic director of the MIX-NY Queer Experimental Media Festival.

Diamond is also known for his performance art pieces which typically aim to challenge and invoke thought about the preconceived notions about gender identity, the binary gender system, and transgender individuals. In the 2014 anthology book Trans Bodies, Trans Selves: A Resource for the Transgender Community Laura Erickson-Schroth makes a specific example from the work Ask A Tranny "In the piece Ask a Tranny, Diamond sets up a small table or booth in which the general public is invited to ask him anything. His goal in this piece is to draw attention to the scrutiny trans people face."

=== Community involvement ===
Aside from his work in the arts, Diamond has been an activist in the LGBT community.

== Filmography ==
| Film | Role | Year |
|---|---|---|
| TrannyFags | Producer, director | 2003 |
| Trans Entities: The Nasty Love of Papi and Wil | Writer, producer, director | 2007 |
| Open | Actor | 2010 |

== Awards and nominations ==
- Lambda Literary Award Nominee
- Haas Fellow Recipient: Social Science Fellowship 2012-2013
