= 5th Tranny Awards =

US adult entertainment industry award

- Date: February 17, 2013
- Site: Beyond the Stars Palace, Glendale, California
- Hosted by: Jujubee

Highlights
- Best Film: Forbidden Lovers 1 - Transromantic
- Most awards: Jane Marie (3)
- Most nominations: Jane Marie (6)

The 5th Annual Tranny Awards was a pornographic awards event recognizing the best in transgender pornography form the previous year from November 1, 2011 to 31 October 2012. the nominees were announced on December 21 2012, online on the trannyawards.com website. The winners were announced during the awards on February 17, 2013.

The winners were decided by a mixture a panel of industry judges and fan voting. This was the fifth awards dedicated to recognising achievements in transgender pornography. Steven Grooby the founder of the awards stated that he wanted to address the lack of representation of transgender performers in awards.

== Winners and nominees ==
The nominations for the 5th Tranny Awards were announced online and opened to fan voting on December 21 2012, online on the trannyawards.com website. The winners were announced during the awards on February 17, 2013.

=== Awards ===
Winners are listed first, highlighted in boldface.

Best Solo Model	Best New Face
**Sarina Valentina**; Acadia Veneer; Adrianna Lynn Rush; Angelina Torres; Delia Delions; Denni; Eva Lin; Dianna Riviera; Gina Hart; Holly Harlow; Jane Marie; Jenna Rachels; Jesse Flores; Jonelle Brooks; Kelly Clare; Khloe Hart; Natalie Foxx; Neveah Skye; Nody Nadia; Ryder Monroe; Sofia Ferreira; Tiffany Starr; Tyra Scott; Venus Luc; Wendy Summers	**Jane Marie**; Alyssah Adams; Annalise Rose; Brielle Bop; Chloe Rose; Cristen Cristensen; Denni; Neveah Skye; Eva Cassini; Gianna Rivera; Gina Hart; Kitty Doll; Natalie Foxx; Sofia Ferreria; Texi Trap; Tropicana; Valere Alamond; Valerie Daniels; Venus Lux
Best Hardcore Model	Best Non-Typical Model
**Foxxy**; Amy Daly; Angelina Torres; Annalise Rose; Chanel Couture; Danika Dreamz; Eva Lin; Honey Foxx; Jane Marie; Jenni Rachels; Jessie Flores; Jessica Foxx; Joanna Jet; Jonelle Brooks; Jordan Jay; Krissy4u; Liberty Harkness; Morgan Bailey; Natalie Foxx; Nody Nadia; Sasha Strokes; Sunshyne Monroe; Teighjiana; Tiffany Starr; Venus Lux; Wendy Williams	**Danni Daniels**; Danielle Foxx; Jamie French; Kim; Krissy4u; Mallory; Michelle Austin; Sadie Hawkins; Tara Emory; Tempest; Wendy Summers; Zoe Fuckpuppet
Best Internet Personality	Best FTM Performer
**Wendy Summers**; Bailey Jay; Bella Bellucci; Britney St Jordan; Caramel; Jamie French; Kelly Pierce; Krissy4u; Lexi Wade; Michelle Austin; Nicole Montero; Sasha Strokes; Wend Williams	**Buck Angel**; Billy Castro; Cyd Loveboy; Dex Hardlove; Jacques LeFemme; James Darling
Best Foreign Performer	Best Non-TS performer
**Rui Matsushita**; Alessandra Riberio; Angeles Cid; Blondie Johnson; Bruna Butterfly; Erika Fox; Kalena Rios; Leticia DeCastor; Mai Ayase; Max; Ying	**Wolf Hudson**; Christian; Alia Janine; Angelina Valentina; CJ; Jesse Carl; Lance; Lucky; Sebastian Keys; Smith; Tyler Alexander
Best DVD	Best Photographer or Scene Producer
**Forbidden Lovers 1 - Transromantic**; American Tranny 2 – Reality Junkies; Amy Daly 2 The Translesbian: Bi-Curious – Third World/Grooby; Bang My Tranny Ass 10 – Mancini Productions; House of 10,000 Shemales – Third World/Grooby; Jane Maire: 5 Star Bitch – Evil Angel; Shemale Strokers 51 – Mancini Productions; Shemale Strokers 55 – Mancini Productions; Shemale.XXX goes to Bangkok - Third World/Grooby; Tgirls Solo 2 – Hot Wendy Productions; The Next Shemale Idol 5 – Evil Angel; Tanssexual Babysitter 21 - Devils Film; TS Playground – Evil Angel	**Sammy Mancini**; Bob; Buddy Wood; Blackula; Frank; Hiro; Kevin Dong; Kevin Moore; Jasmin Jewels; Liberty Harkness; Nick Milo; Remy X; Terry; Tomcat
Best Solo Website	Best Scene
**Jesse**; Angelina Torres; Big Dick Madison - Madison; Carmen Moore; Delia TS; Foxxy; Hannah Sweden; Jamie French; Joanna Jet; Jordan Jay; Kelly Clare; Krissy4u; Latina Tranny; Liberty Harkness; Michelle Austin; Sasha Strokes; Sunshyne Monroe; TS Rockdolls - Tempest; Tiffany Starr; Wendy Summers; Wendy Williams	**"Wendy Summers & Sadie Hawkins - Managed**; Amy Daly & Christian - Forbidden Lovers 1; Danika Dreamz, Valerie & Christian - Canadian-Tgirl; Danni Daniels & Kelly Clare - TSSeduction.com; Domino Pressly & Christian - Mr & Mrs XXX; Eva Lin & Danni Daniels - TS Playground; Eva Lin & Steve Stirling - TSSeduction.com; Gianna Rivera & Casey - The Next She-Male Idol 5; Jane Marie & Christian - Shemalepornstar.com; Jayle Marie & Tyler Alexander - TSSeduction.com; Jenna Rachels & Sebastian Keys - TSSeduction.com; Jessica Fox & Francesca Le - TSPussyhunters.com; Jessica Fox & Jesse Carl - TSSeduction.com; Joanna Jet - Playthings; Jonelle Brooks & Trevor - JonelleBrooks.com; Jorday Jay - My Neighbor; Liberty Harkness & Christian - libertyharkness.com; Morgan Bailey & S.Jack TSSeduction.com; Nelly & Smith - shemalepornstar.com; Neveah Skye - shemale.xxx; Ryder Monroe & Christian - shemale.xxx; Tyra Scott & Lance - Vampire; Venus Lux & Katie - The Next She-Male Idol 5
Shemale Yum Model of the Year	Shemale Strokers Model of the Year:
**Jane Marie**	**Tyra Scott**
Best DVD Director	Reader's Choice Fan Award
**Joey Silvera**; Blackula; Buddy Wood; Jay Sin; Joanna Jet; Kevin Moore; Frank; Nica Noelle; Sammy Mancini; Wendy Williams	**Jane Marie**
Black Tgirls Model of the Year:	Kink Award for Kinkiest Tgirl Domme
**Chanel Couture**	**Jessica Fox**
Lifetime Achievement Award	Bob's Tgirls Model Of The Year
**Adriana Lynn Rush**	**Gia Darling** (performer) **Sammy Mancini** (non-performer)
