= 6th Tranny Awards =

US adult entertainment industry award

- Date: February 16, 2014
- Site: Beyond the Stars Palace, Glendale, California
- Hosted by: Jujubee

Highlights
- Best Film: Tranny Chaser (Grooby Productions)
- Most awards: Venus Lux (3)
- Most nominations: Aubrey Kate; Foxxy; Blackula; Kim Bella; Tiffany Starr; Wendy Summers (4 each)

The 6th Annual Tranny Awards was a pornographic awards event recognizing the best in transgender pornography form the previous year from November 1, 2011 to 31 October 2012. the nominees were announced on November 14, 2013, online on the trannyawards.com website. The winners were announced during the awards on February 16, 2014. There were a total of 22 Award categories.

The awards were the best attended of the Tranny awards held up to that point, with 800 attendees. Founder of the awards Steven Grooby stated: “The Tranny Awards started as a joke, now it’s a nice event.”

== Winners and nominees ==
The nominations for the 6th Tranny Awards were announced online and opened to fan voting on December 21, 2012, online on the trannyawards.com website. The winners were announced during the awards on February 16, 2014.

=== Awards ===
Winners are listed first, highlighted in boldface.

Best Solo Model	Best New Face
**Sarina Valentina**; Anastasia; Aubrey Kate; Eva Cassini; Eva Winters; Domino Presley; Gianna Riviera; Foxxy; Jenna Rachels; Jonelle Brooks; Kandi Redd; Kelly Claire; Kim Bella; Penny Tyler; Ryder Monroe; Sofia Ferreira; Sunshyne Monroe	**Kim Bella**; Anastasia; Aubrey Kate; Bird Mountain; Eva Winters; Jaqueline Braxton; Kandii Redd; Kimberlin Rixx; Kourtney Dash; London Starr; Miranda Meadows; Penny Tyler; Sienna Grace; Stefani Special; Tori Mayes; Yuri Myeon
Best Hardcore Performer	Best Alternative Model
**Venus Lux**; Aubrey Kate; Chanel Couture; Chelsea Marie; Danni Daniels; Eva Cassini; Eva Lin; Foxxy; Gaby; Jaqueline Woods; Jessica Foxx; Joanna Jet; Jordan Jay; Kelly Clare; Khloe Hart; Kim Bella; Madison (BDB); Natassia Dreams; Sasha Strokes; Tiffany Starr; Tyra Scott; Wendy Summers	**Chelsea Marie**; Danni Daniels; Chelsea Poe; Crona Valentine; Jamie French; Kelly Clare; Krissy 4u; Mallory; Tempest
Best Internet Personality	Best FTM Performer
**Wendy Summers**; Bailey Jay; Bella Bellucci; Caramel; Krissy; Kelly Pierce; Lexi Wade; Madison (BDB); Michelle Austin; Nicole Montero; Tempest; Victoria Veil; Wendy Williams	**James Darling**; Buck Angel; Chance Armstrong; Devon Wipp; Fritz Von Fuckup; Jacques LeFemme; Ramses Rodstein; Rex
Best Foreign Performer	Best Non-TS performer
**Bruna Castro** (Brazil); Aline Garcia (Brazil); Angeles Cid (Argentina); Bruna Butterfly (Brazil); Chuling (Japan); Francine Gurchick (Philippines); Jasmine (Thailand); Karina Shiratori (Japan); Lisa (Japan); Nicole Montero (Chile); Mary (Thailand); Sapphire Young (Philippines)	**Christian**; Ava Devine; Bella Wilde; Chad Diamond; Katie St.Ives; Giovanni; Lance; Leah Cortez; Ramon; Smith; Wolf Hudson
Best DVD	Best Photographer
**Tranny Chaser** (Grooby Productions); American She-Male X 5 (Joey Silvera Video/Evil Angel); Black She-Male Idol 4 (Joey Silvera Video/Evil Angel); Blackula’s Hot Tranny Buffet (Grooby Productions); Canadian Tgirls 1 (Grooby Productions); False Advertising 3 (Third World Media); I Kill It TS 1 (Trans 500); Role Play 7 (Raw Dawgg Entertainment); Shemale Cougar 3 (Brazen Devil); SheMale Does POV 2 (Brazen Devil); She-Male Strokers 57 (Rodney Moore/Mancini Productions); She-Male Strokers 59 (Rodney Moore/Mancini Productions); Tranny Hookups 4 (Tranny Factory); Trans Grrrls (TroubleFILMS); Transsexual Babysitters 24 (Devil's Films); Trustfund Trannie's (Shemale Club); TS Girlfriend 3 (Trans 500); TS Playground 3 (Jay Sin Video/Evil Angel)	**Blackula**; Bob Maverick; Damien Cain; Frank; Hiroshi; Jamie French; Josh Stone; Kila Kali; Terry Grooby; Nick Milo; Omar Wax; Radius Dark; Remy Melanie
Best Solo Website	Best Scene
**Venus Lux** – venus-lux.com; Ana Mancini – anatranny.com; Angeles Cid – angelescid.com; Angelina Torres – angelina-torres.com; Eva Lin – evalinxxx.com; Foxxy – ts-foxxy.com; Jamie French – tsjamiefrench.com; Jesse – ts-jesse.com; Joanna Jet – joannajet.com; Jonelle Brooks – jonellebrooks.com; Jordan Jay – jordanjayxxx.com; Kelly Clare – tskellyclare.com; Krissy 4U – krissy4u.com; Liberty Harkness – libertyharkness.com; Madison – The Big Dick Bitch – bigdickbitch.com; Michelle Austin – michelle-austin.com; Morgan Bailey – morgan-bailey.com; Sarina Valentina – sarinavalentina.com; Sasha Strokes – sashastrokesxxx.com; Sunshyne Monroe – sunshyneland.com; Tiffany Starr – tiffanystarrxxx.com; Tempest – ts-rockdolls.com; Wendy Summers – wendysummers.com; Wendy Williams – wendywilliamsxxx.com	**Venus Lux and Foxxy – Asian Nail Salon** (Venus-Lux.com); 1 Trick, 2 Treats – Vaniity (Trans500.com); Boo Boo Kitty Fuck – Wendy Summers and Kitty Doll (WendySummers.com); Aubrey Kate’s Threesome (ShemalePornstar.com); Celeste and Giovanni (Shemale.XXX); Chuling Hardcore (Shemale-Japan.com); Fan Fuxxx – Jesse meets Mitch (TS-Jesse.com); Gangbang Orgy – Jessica Fox, Maitresse Madeline, Eva Lin, and Venus ** Lux (TSPussyHunters.com); Jamie and Stefani (TSJamieFrench.com); Jessica Fox and Chanel Couture (EvilAngel.com); Kayla Biggs and Means – (BlackShemaleHardcore.com); Kim Bella and Christian – (ShemaleYum.com); Mary and Christian Hardcore (Shemale.XXX); Nicole Montero and Gia Itzel (LatinaTranny.com); Natassia Dreams – Better Than Ever – (Trans500); Sasha New Year (Sashastrokesxxx.com); Sienna Grace and Christian – (ShemalePornstar.com); Stefani Special and Jacqueline Woods (CrashPadSeries.com); Tiffany Starr, Bird Mountain, and TS Miss Mary (TiffanyStarrXXX.com); Tiffany Starr & Katja Kassin for (TSPussyHunters.com); Tyra Scott and Sebastian Keys (TSSeduction.com); Venus Lux and Blake (TSSeduction.com)
Best DVD Director	Best Scene Director
**Joey Silvera**; Blackula; Buddy Wood; Ed Hunter; Courtney Trouble; Jay Sin; Joanna Jet; Josh Stone; Kevin Dong; Sammy Mancini; Tom Moore	**Buddy Wood**; Blackula; Courtney Trouble; Hiroshi; Josh Stone; Kevin Dong; Louise Damazo; Lucia Matthews; Sammi Mancini; Tomcat
Voluptuous Diva Award	Shemale Strokers Model of the Year
**Michelle Austin**; Amber Skye; Asia Hilton; Doll; Eve; Kourtney Kisses; Madison BDB; Majorie Luvanna; Quinn; Tristin Moore; Wendy Williams	**Gina Hart** and **Penny Tyler** (tie)
Black Tgirls Model of the Year	Shemale Yum Model of the Year
**Kandii Redd**	**Sienna Grace**
Bob's Tgirls Model Of The Year	Fan Choice Award
**Eva Cassini**	**Khloe Hart**
Lifetime Achievement Award
**Danny Evangelista** (performer) **Bob Maverick** (non-performer)
