= 1st Tranny Awards =

US pornography award show

- Date: January 9, 2009
- Site: Grooby.com
- Hosted by: Steven Grooby

Highlights
- Best Film: Buddy Wood’s Shemale Superstars
- Most awards: No multiple winners
- Most nominations: Kelly Shore (4)

The 1st Annual Tranny Awards were a pornographic awards event recognizing the best in transgender pornography form the previous year from November 1, 2007 to 31 October 2008. Nominations were announced online on December 16, 2008 on Grooby.com. The winners were announced online on January 9, 2009. The winners were decided by a panel of industry judges. It was the first installment of the Tranny Awards which are now known as the Transgender Erotica Awards.

This was the first awards dedicated to recognising achievements in transgender pornography. Steven Grooby the founder of the awards stated that he wanted to address the lack of representation of transgender performers in awards.

== Winners and nominees ==
The nominees for the 1st Tranny Awards were announced on December 16, 2008, online on the Grooby.com website. The winners were announced during the awards ceremony on January 9, 2009.

=== Awards ===
Winners are listed first, highlighted in boldface.

Best North American/European Website Model	Best Website Model from an Asian Country
**Natassia Dreams**; Jessica Host; Foxxy; Kelly Shore; Vicki Richter; Jessie Flores; Kimber James; Celeste	**Areeya**; Banana; Wawa; Mint
Best Website Model from a South American Country	Best Performer in a DVD
**Bianca Friere**; Keilana Love; Thays Schivinato; Jhenifer Heloizy; Kalena Rios; Patricia Bismark; Mariana Cordoba; Nicole Montero; Carla Norvaes; Bianca Friere	**Vicki Richter**; Mandy Mitchell; Danielle Foxxx; Kimber James; Sexy Jade; Wendy Williams; Khloe Hart; Kelly Shore; Jesse Flores
Best Non-TS Performer	Best DVD Release
**Christian**; Lobo; Vin Diesel; Sarah Jane Ceylon; Cindy Crawford	**Buddy Wood’s Shemale Superstars**; Bobs Tgirls Fantasies 12; Joey Silvera’s Rogue Adventures 31; Wendy William’s Interacial Gangbang; Gia Darling Will Kick Your Ass; Buddy Wood’s Shemale Superstars; Transsexual Babysitters 8 (honourable mention); Transsexual Prostitutes 54
Best Solo TS Paysite or Paysite Operated by a TS.	Best Non-Adult TG Orientated Website
**Latina Tranny**; VickyRichter.com; Hotwendywilliams.com; Farrah Mills; Mandy Tgirl; TS Jesse; Kellyshore.com; SexyJade; Jessica’s Diary	**Urnotalone**; HungAngels; Stopping The Hate; Birchplace; HungDevils; Tgirltalk; Kalina Isato; TG Personals
Best Amateur Style* TG Website	Black TGirl Model of the Year
**Tara-TS.com**; Jaime Cross – HotCross; Aly Sinclair – Hotties Unlimited; Delia CD (honorable mention); The Crossdresser; Jaime Coxx; Krissy 4 U; Sexii Trina; Luci May; Zoe Fuck Puppet	**Katie Coxx**; Sexxy Jade; Kelise
Shemale Yum Model of the Year	Grooby New Face of 2008
**Chrissy**; Hazel Tucker; Harley Quinn; Kelly Shore	**Hazel Tucker**
Lifetime Achievement Award
**Meghan Chavalier**
