= 3rd Tranny Awards =

US adult entertainment industry award

- Date: February 5th 2011
- Site: Blue Moon Nights, North Hollywood

Highlights
- Best Film: Morgan Bailey’s Bad Day
- Most awards: Domino Presley (2)
- Most nominations: Mia Isabella and Domino Pressley (5)

The 3rd Annual Tranny Awards was a pornographic awards event recognizing the best in transgender pornography form the previous year from November 1, 2009, to 31 October 2010. The nominees for the 3rd Tranny Awards were announced on January 9, 2011, online on the trannyawards.com website. The winners were announced during the awards on February 5, 2011.

The winners were decided by a mixture a panel of industry judges and fan voting.

This was the third awards dedicated to recognising achievements in transgender pornography. Steven Grooby the founder of the awards stated that he wanted to address the lack of representation of transgender performers in awards. Grooby stated "The event went better than I'd hoped, and the plan is to use this as springboard for something bigger next year."

== Winners and nominees ==
The nominees for the 3rd Tranny Awards were announced on January 9, 2011, online on the trannyawards.com website. The winners were announced during the awards on February 5, 2011.

=== Awards ===
Winners are listed first, highlighted in boldface.

Best Website Model Solo	Best Website Model Hardcore
**Bailey Jay**; Amy Daly; Angelina Torres; Bee Armitage; Britney Fox; Celeste; Chrissy Snow; Danni Daniels; Domino Presley; Foxxy; Hailey (BTG); Jesse Flores; Jessica Foxx; Joanna Jet; Kimber James; Lucia Matthews; Luxury Love; Mia Isabella; Morgan Bailey; Natassia Dreams; Nicole Montero; Olivia Love; Sarina Valentina; Tara Emory; Wendy Williams	**Celeste**; Carla Novaes; Domino Presley; Foxxy; Jesse Flores; Jessica Host; Jessica Foxx; Joanna Jet; Juliette Stray; Kimber James; Kinky Kennedy; Liberty Harkness; Long Mint; Mandy Mitchell; Mia Isabella; Morgan Bailey; Nataliaa Coxx; Nicole Montero; Wendy Williams; Yasmin Lee
Best DVD Performer	Best DVD
**Jessica Foxx**; Amy Daly; Britney Markham; Domino Presley; Celeste; Hazel Tucker; Jesse Flores; Jessica Foxx; Kimberly Kills; Mia Isabella; Morgan Bailey; Natassia Dreams; Vaniity	**Morgan Bailey's Bad Day**; Mia Isabella: Want Some Honey?; The Next She-Male Idol 2; She-Male XTC 7; Shemale Idol The Auditions; Shemale Pornstar: A Shemale For All Seasons; Shemale Strokers 41; Solo Tgirl Roses; Suck my Tranny Cock #7; Transsexual Babysitters 10; Transsexual Cheerleaders; Transsexual Cockstars Starring Celeste
Best DVD Director	Best Non-TS performer
**Buddy Wood**; Joey Silvera; Jon Sable; PK Vegas; Sammi Mancini; Tom Moore; Wendy Williams	**Angelina Valentine**; Cane; Christian; Danny; Hollie Stevens; John Magnum; Liz Vicious; Smith; Tom Moore; Toro
Best Independent Website	Best Solo TGirl Website
**Delia TS**; Katie Ayanami; Kalina Isato; Tara-TS; JamiesFetish; Mallory’s Got Feet; JoannaJet.com; Kirsty Scott; Paris Pirelli	**Mandy Mitchell**; Amy Daly; Ana Mancini; Ashley George; TS Bailey Jay; Danielle Foxx – Sex Change Girl; Hazel Tucker; Jasmine Jewels; TS Jesse; Krissy4u.com; Mia Isabella; Hot Wendy Williams
Best Free Website	Best Up & Cummer
**HungAngels**; Caramel’s Tgirls; HungAngels; HungDevils; The Photographic World of Scott & Ben; Shemale Cocktail; Stopping The Hate; TG Flix; Tschatter; Trapgirlfriend; Transvamp	**Domino Presley**; Alice Amuze; Bee Armitage; Bianca Belle; Brittnay Jordan; Chloe; Danni Daniels; Denise Vixen; Kat Taylor; Lexi Wade; Madison Montag; Nody Nadia; Yazlene Reyes
Shemale Yum Model of the Year	Shemale Strokers Model of the Year:
**Domino Presley**	**Britney Markham**
Black TGirls Model of the Year:	Lifetime Achievement Award
**Sheeba Starr**	**Joanna Jet** (performer) **Tony Vee** (non-performer)
