= Christopher Lee (activist) =

American LGBT activist

- Born: September 4, 1964; San Diego, California, U.S.
- Died: December 22, 2012 (aged 48)
- Occupation: Activist

Christopher "Christoph" Lee (September 4, 1964 – December 22, 2012) was an American transgender activist, and award-winning filmmaker in the San Francisco Bay Area community. He was also the co-founder of Tranny Fest, now called the San Francisco Transgender Film Festival (SFTFF). In 2002 he was the first openly trans man Grand Marshal of San Francisco Pride. Lee's death and the designation of his assigned gender at birth on his death certificate rather than his self-identified gender was the impetus behind the "Respect After Death Act", AB 1577, which was passed in California on September 26, 2014.

== Personal life ==
Christopher Lee was born in San Diego, California. An obituary describes him as "a powerful and fierce two-spirit being" and "an integral part of the recovery community".

== Activism ==
In 1997, Lee collaborated with Al Austin and Elise Hurwitz to establish Tranny Fest (later renamed the San Francisco Transgender Film Festival), the first transgender film and arts festival in the world.

Laura Horak named Lee, along with filmmakers like Mirha-Soleil Ross, Stephanie Anne Lloyd, Buck Angel, Morty Diamond, and Cary Cronenwatt, as important trailblazers in trans porn filmmaking.

== Death and memorial ==
Christopher Lee died by suicide on December 22, 2012, after suffering from depression and mental illness. Community healing ceremonies, tribute film festivals, and LGBTQ archives were dedicated to his memory. As Lee had not updated the gender on his birth certificate, the coroner labeled Lee as "female" on his death certificate, sparking legal controversy and debate. Lee's family presented documentation indicating that Lee self-identified as a "Female to Male transgender man". With the support of the Transgender Law Center, Maya Moyra Selkie Scott, and Chino Scott-Chung, the "Respect After Death Act", AB 1577, was introduced by California Assemblywoman Toni Atkins. The bill's mission was to help fill out death certificates for transgender people. AB 1577 was passed by California Governor Jerry Brown on September 26, 2014.

== Honors and awards ==
Lee was the first female-to-male transgender Grand Marshal of San Francisco Pride (2002).

In June 2019, Lee was one of the inaugural fifty American "pioneers, trailblazers, and heroes" inducted on the National LGBTQ Wall of Honor within the Stonewall National Monument (SNM) in New York City's Stonewall Inn. The SNM is the first U.S. national monument dedicated to LGBTQ rights and history, and the wall's unveiling was timed to take place during the 50th anniversary of the Stonewall riots.

== Filmography ==
- Christopher's Chronicles (1996)
- Trappings of Transhood (1997)
- Alley of the TrannyBoys (1998)
- Sex Flesh in Blood (1999)
