= 2nd Tranny Awards =

US adult entertainment industry award

- Date: March 4, 2010
- Site: Cobra Club, Los Angeles
- Hosted by: Michelle Austin

Highlights
- Best Film: Hazel Does Hollywood
- Most awards: Hazel Tucker (3)
- Most nominations: Hazel Tucker (3)

The 2nd Annual Tranny Awards was a pornographic awards event recognizing the best in transgender pornography form the previous year from November 1, 2008 to 31 October 2009. Nominations were announced online in December, 2009 online at trannyawards.com. The winners were announced online on January 9, 2010. The winners were decided by a panel of industry judges.

This was a continuation of the first awards dedicated to recognising achievements in transgender pornography. Steven Grooby the founder of the awards stated that he wanted to address the lack of representation of transgender performers in awards.

Grooby stated "we feel the main adult industry marginalizes our niche" and "Running these awards allows us to give back something to the community of models and producers who keep this industry growing.

== Winners and nominees ==
The nominees for the 2nd Tranny Awards were announced in December, 2009, online on the trannyawards.com website. The winners were announced during the awards on January 9, 2010, with the awards presented later on March 4, 2010.

=== Awards ===
Winners are listed first, highlighted in boldface.

Best Website Model	Best Performer in a DVD
**Hazel Tucker**; Kimber James; Lucia Miel; Natalia Coxxx; Farrah Mills; Ashley George; Yasmin Lee; Morgan Bailey; Harley Quinn; Amy Daly; Foxxy; Carla Renata; Danielle Foxxx; Mandy Mitchell; Celeste; Liberty Harkness; Melissa Mendez; Jesse Flores	**Hazel Tucker**; Astrid Shay; Jesse Flores; Kimber James; Yasmin Lee; Jessica Host; Natalia Coxxx; Olivia Love; Natassia Dreams; Morgan Bailey; Mandy Mitchell
Best Non-TS Performer	Best DVD Release
**Billy Long**; Tom Moore; Ranger (TS Seduction); Danielle Starr; Christian; Kassie; Lobo; John Magnum	**Hazel Does Hollywood**; Up Close and Virtual with Danielle Foxxx; Bobs Tgirls 14; Transexdomination; Rogue Adventures 33; Cowboys and Shemale Indians; America's Next Top Tranny 3; America's Next Top Tranny 4; Bang My Tranny Ass 4
Best DVD Director	Best Solo TG Website
**Joey Silvera**; Jon Sable; Buddy Wood; Joanna Jet; Nacho Vidal; PK Vegas; Sam Mancini	**Wendy Williams**; Jesse Flores; Mia Isabella; Kimber James; Mariam Micol; Areeya's World; Mandy Mitchell; TS Tara; Farrah Mills; Mandy Mitchell; Sammi Valentine
Best Amateur Website	Best Blog
**Delia TS**; Mallory's Feet; Transextreme; Kirsty Scott; Krissy 4U; Transvamp; Zoefuckpuppet; TS Rockdolls; Kinky Kennedy	**Godiva's TGirls**; TGirl Alexis Lane; TransBlogs; Stopping the Hate; Caramel's TGirls; Hot Amateur Shemales
Shemale Yum Model of the Year	Black TGirl Model of the Year
**Morgan Bailey**	**Natalia Coxxx**
Grooby New Face of 2008	Lifetime Achievement Award
**Amy Daly**	**Olivia Love**
