= Breanna Sinclairé =

American singer

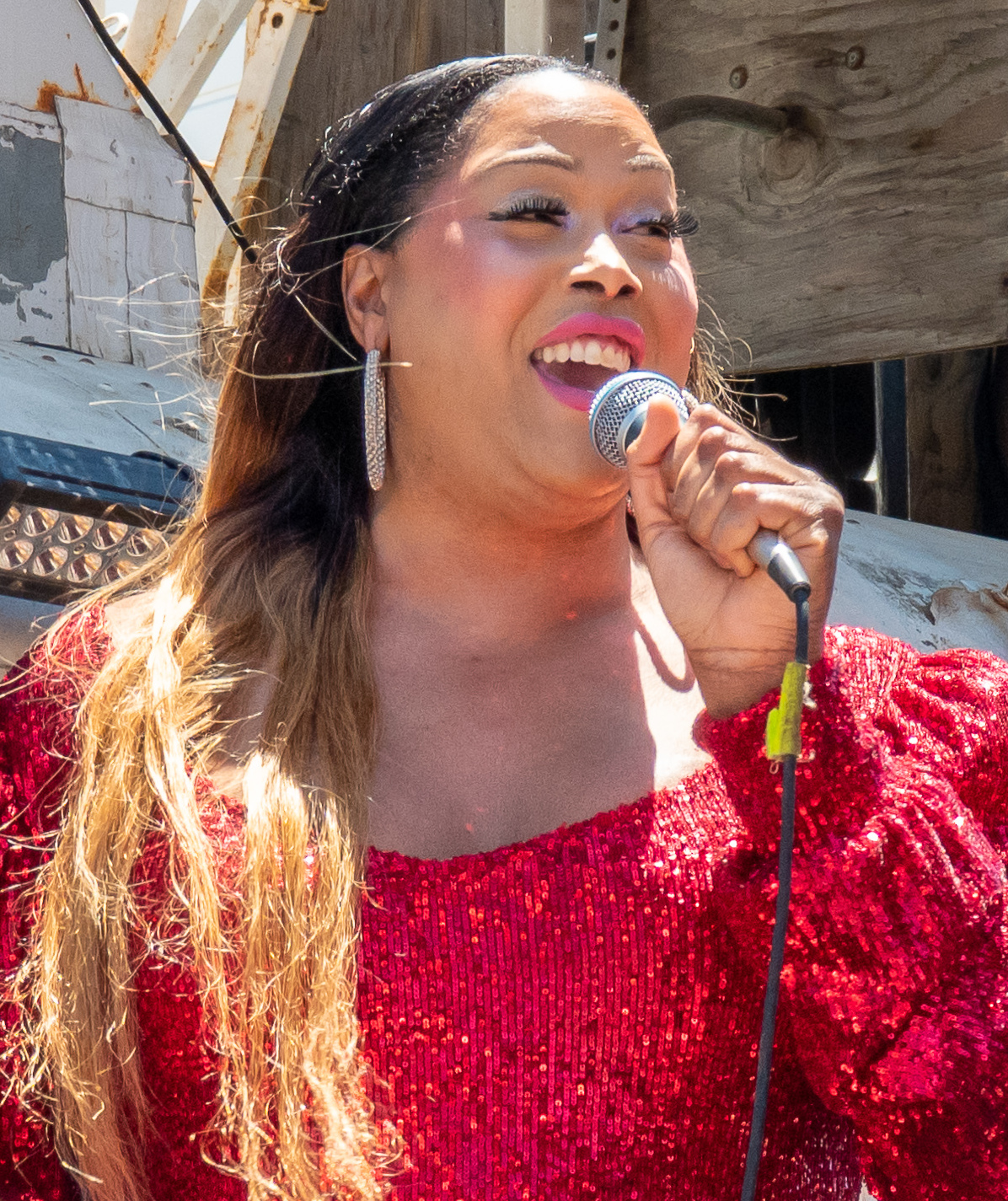
Breanna Sinclairé in June 2022

Breanna Sinclairé (born c. 1991) is an American singer based in California. In June 2015, she became the first transgender woman to sing the American national anthem at a professional sports event.

== Biography ==
Sinclairé was brought up in Baltimore by parents who played various musical instruments. It was above all her grandmother who encouraged Sinclairé to sing in the Baptist church choir and take an interest in opera, playing recordings of African American singers including Jessye Norman, Marian Anderson and Leontyne Price. Her grandmother also took her to see her first opera, Madame Butterfly, and helped her enroll at the Baltimore School for the Arts. Despite her interest in opera, her mother sent her to Kingswood University in New Brunswick, Canada, in the hope she would become a pastor.

Sinclairé soon left the school, spending several months in New York City before she finally managed to pursue her singing aspirations after obtaining a scholarship from the California Institute of the Arts. During her final year, she began her sometimes painful transition but found encouragement by setting her sights on the lead role in Carmen, "that sassy, confident woman". She went on to receive her master's degree at the San Francisco Conservatory of Music in 2014, assisted in particular by Ruby Pleasure. After studying with Sheri Greenawald at the San Francisco Opera, she began performing repertoire as a lyric soprano.

In June 2015, Sinclairé made history by becoming the first transgender woman to sing The Star-Spangled Banner at a professional sporting event when she sang at the Oakland Athletics Stadium to a crowd of 30,000 for a game between the Oakland Athletics and the San Diego Padres.

Sinclairé is the subject of a documentary film, Mezzo, which screened at the 2016 San Francisco Transgender Film Festival.
