= Eva Lin =

American pornographic film actress (born 1985)

- Lin in 2014
- Born: 1985 (age 40–41); Philippines
- Occupation: Pornographic film actress
- Awards: AVN Award for Transgender Performer of the Year (2014)
- Website: evalinxxx.com

Eva Lin (born 1985) is an American transgender pornographic film actress.

== Early life ==
Lin was born in the Philippines and came to the United States with her sister when she was 9 years old. She was raised in the San Francisco Bay Area in what she describes as a conservative Catholic family.

== Career ==
Lin began her adult film career in 2011, performing for Grooby Productions and Kink.com. She was named Transgender Performer of the Year at the 31st AVN Awards in 2014. The same year, she signed an exclusive contract with transgender pornography production company Trans500.
