= After America (film) =

- North American Poster
- Directed by: Jake Yuzna
- Written by: Jake Yuzna
- Produced by: Jake Yuzna
- Starring: Yvonne Freese; Theresa McConnon; Daniel Nies; Ahmed Yusuf; Dan Fox; Eli Anthony; Robert Dante
- Edited by: Jake Yuzna
- Music by: Sho Nikaido
- Production companies: Narrative Films and Studio Yuzna
- Release date: February 15, 2021 (Slamdance Film Festival)
- Running time: 127 minutes
- Country: United States

After America is a 2021 American drama film, written and directed by Jake Yuzna. Created through an open call in 2019, the film follows a group of criminal justice de-escalation workers in Minneapolis, MN who gather in order to confront the failures they faced in their jobs and personal lives. Employing radical theater workshop techniques devised by Jake Yuzna, this unorthodox group developed a series of interwoven stories based on their real lives. The resulting film merged improvised and devised performances to blur together the usually separate filmmaking traditions of scripted and nonfiction. Looking to collide the stories American's tell themselves with realities they face, the film created a singular portrait of the pain and unrest bubbling under the surface of the American way of life.

Completed one month before the unrest following the murder of George Floyd, "After America" is a snapshot of a Minneapolis struggling to move towards a better future that lies after America.

Premiering in the Breakouts section of the Slamdance Film Festival in 2021.

== Cast ==
- Yvonne Freese
- Theresa McConnon
- Daniel Nies
- Ahmed Ismail Yusuf
- Dan Fox
- Eli Anthony
- Robert Dante
- Sophia Dunn-Walker
