= Stephanie Booth =

British businesswoman

- Born: 25 May 1946; St Albans, Hertfordshire
- Died: 18 September 2016 (aged 70); Corwen, Denbighshire
- Other name: Stephanie Anne Lloyd
- Known for: Transsexual business owner

Stephanie Anne Booth (25 May 1946 – 18 September 2016), also known as Stephanie Anne Lloyd, was a British transgender business owner and hotelier, based in Llangollen. She founded the Transformation line of stores that catered to crossdressers and transgender patrons, opening stores across the UK and abroad. She starred in the reality television series Hotel Stephanie for BBC Wales in 2008 and 2009.

== Early life ==
Booth was born on 25 May 1946, in St Albans, Hertfordshire. Booth had one sister, who was 10 years older than her. Her parents were strict Jehovah's Witnesses who converted just before her 7th birthday. As a teenager, Booth found she wasn't attracted to either men or women and hid behind her religion to avoid advances from women. In a 1988 interview with Ruby Wax, she stated that "I was naturally born with a chromosome disorder, which meant that I was partly female anyway."

== Later life ==
After finishing secondary school, Booth worked as a laboratory technician, cinema manager, costing clerk and retail chain manager. In 1968, she began dating a woman, and proposed to her 10 days after they'd first met. Three months later, they were married and Booth fathered three children. The couple began to have marital issues, leading Booth's wife to take her to the doctor, who told her she was transsexual. Booth later divorced her wife in 1981 and began living alone in northwest England. During this time, she began experimenting with wearing women's clothing in the evenings and at weekends. She later came out as transgender to her parents, who cut off all contact with her. Her Jehovah's Witnesses congregation also excommunicated her.

Booth began gender reassignment through an NHS specialist psychologist at Wythenshawe Hospital, Manchester. This was followed by surgery in September 1983 at Charing Cross Hospital, London. Booth worked as a sales and marketing director at Hestair Hope in 1983, when she underwent electrolysis, breast augmentation, and a rhinoplasty during the Christmas holiday break. She returned to work on 5 January 1984 as a woman with the name Stephanie Anne Lloyd. News of her transition was leaked to the press. Initially, Booth told employees and the press that she had caught a tropical disease to which the only cure was to have hormone injections and become a woman, or she would die. However, the Hospital for Tropical Diseases in London stated "We can't think of a single disease requiring such treatment." Booth's employer offered her £20,000 to resign due to the overwhelming tabloid publicity. She ultimately lost her managerial job and was unable to find a new one.

== Transformation shop and other ventures ==
In 1984, Booth started Transformation, a clothing and lingerie shop in Manchester that catered to the transgender community. In 1985, she was arrested and charged for running a bawdy house in the upstairs section of the shop. Booth claimed that she had been told a massage service that offered sexual services was legal. She pleaded guilty and was given a 12-month suspended sentence. In 1985, she moved in with David Booth, her business partner whom she had met through a newspaper advertisement. David was the owner of the Spar supermarkets chain in the UK. They married in February 1986 in Sri Lanka, as British law at this time didn't recognise such marriages.

Later business ventures included a transgender mail order catalogue, a phone line that played a recording of her life story, and TV Scene, a transgender magazine published by TMC Publications. In 1987 Booth opened a transgender hotel on Queen's Road, Oldham. She later opened Transformation shops in London, Birmingham, Newcastle upon Tyne, Bristol, and Belfast. In March 1998 she also opened a branch in Berlin.

Booth was featured on a ITV Granada in May 1998 and later that year announced the opening of Stephanie Anne Investments Ltd. The company was based in Manchester and offered transgender people employment support and investment advice. They also expanded their mail order business to cover mainland Europe and the United States.

Booth joined Lancashire County Cricket Club in January 1989, during a time when the club only allowed men to become full members. Booth was able to join as her birth certificate still listed her as male. The club decided to hold to a vote on opening full membership open to women at their yearly AGM, where Booth addressed those attending and appealed to them to support the motion. In 1990 she moved to Llangar with her husband.

=== Jail sentence ===
On 23 November 1991 Booth was sentenced to a 12-month jail sentence after pleading guilty to selling obscene videos. She was sentenced alongside one of her business partners, Raiko Ristic, and both were individually fined £3000. Booth claimed she had not viewed the offending tapes but had sold them after Ristic had watched them and wrote up an outline of the contents. The police seized more than 5000 videos in a series of raids across 9 sites linked to Booth. Booth's psychiatrist recommended that she be housed in a female prison after Booth experienced abuse during her initial stay at HM Prison Risley. The Home Office ultimately decided she should serve her term at HM Prison Askham Grange, a women's prison. Booth appealed her sentence and the courts agreed that it was too harsh. As a result she was released early in February 1997, having served just over three months.

=== Albany Gender Clinic ===
In 1992, Booth founded the Albany Gender Identity Clinic as a centre for transsexuals to seek specialist medical advice and guidance on their condition. The clinic was located in Manchester and doctors offered counselling and referrals to Charing Cross Hospital for gender reassignment surgery.

In March 1992 Booth was targeted by blackmailers who threatened to kill her and petrol bomb her chain of Transformation stores across the UK. The blackmailers demanded £150,000 in cash and a prearranged drop site 200 miles away from Manchester was arranged. Booth called the police, who monitored the drop and gave chase when two men in their 30s collected the money. The incident ended when the police rammed the suspects' car and the men were arrested. Magistrates decided to drop the case against the suspects in 20 August 1992.

In October 1993 Booth announced she had invested £500,000 in launching a TV station catering specifically to cross-dressers and transgender people. The station was to be called Transformation, after Booth's chain of shops, and was due to be launched either on the 18 or 25 of December 1993. The channel would be broadcast from Berlin and would be free to view for a six-week period, before introducing a weekly pay-per-view system. The announcement was controversial, as it was believed that uncensored pornographic films would be aired. Brendan McGahon and Lady Olga Maitland publicly spoke out about the channel, calling for it to be banned. Peter Brooke, who was Secretary of State for National Heritage at the time, discussed the matter in Parliament, warning that anyone airing pornographic material would face potential penalties. Booth obtained a broadcast licence for the channel on 23 October 1994, called TV for TVs. Booth became one of the earliest trans filmmakers to produce porn directed at the trans community, along with artists like Mirha-Soleil Ross, Christopher Lee, Buck Angel, and Cary Cronenwett.

=== Llangollen Hotels & Hotel Stephanie ===
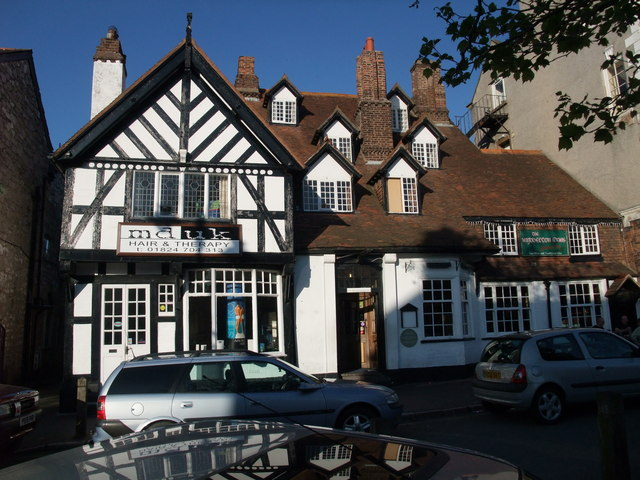
The Myddelton Arms which Booth purchased in 2003

In 2003 Booth had bought a series of five hotels in Ruthin. This included the Myddleton Arms and the adjoining Castle Hotel, Bodidris Hall, Plough Hotel, Anchor Hotel, and the Clwyd Gate Restaurant. Booth explained that she became a hotelier "by accident" after finding out that the owner of Bodidris Hall was planning to sell. Booth offered lesbian and gay weddings at her venues, as well as offering transsexuals the chance to stay at Bodidris Hall for crossdressing weekends. The hotels were managed under the name Llangollen Hotels Limited.

In 2008, Mentorn Cymru began production of reality television series Hotel Stephanie for BBC Wales. The series focused on Booth and her running of her hotel chain, based mainly on activities around Llangollen. The programme was commissioned for a second series in 2009, which focused on the couples' 2010 takeover and refurbishment of The Wynnstay Arms hotel in Wrexham.

Booth publicly claimed that she planned to invest £1 million in the Wynnstay Arms in the first year of ownership. When she ran the hotel, Booth also organised street festivals and fun days in Wrexham, shutting off the street to allow the events to be held outside.

On 7 July 2011, Booth's hotels went into financial administration. The Wynnstay Arms was closed before administrators were appointed. In March 2013 The Anchor Hotel and the Chester Bridge Hotel closed alongside her three soft playgrounds following the appointment of the administrators. It was reported that Booth's businesses expanded rapidly but failed to keep up with debt repayments. Four other hotels, which had been trading well, were put up for sale. Booth claimed that she would ensure that all staff were paid using her own funds.

In September 2013, Booth's final hotel, the Ye Olde Anchor Inn in Ruthin, was sold. The hotel had been closed since 2012. Booth said she planned to focus on her international businesses and the Yatter Yatter magazine.

=== Wrexham A.F.C. ===
In 2011, Booth announced her intention to take over Wrexham A.F.C. with an interest-free loan to save the club from entering financial administration, along with a plan to raise £5 million to purchase the club through a community-based venture. In May she announced that she was withdrawing her attempt to buy the club following death threats.

=== Yattar Yattar ===
Booth published a lifestyle magazine called Yattar Yattar that focused on North and Mid-Wales, Cheshire, and Shropshire. Yattar Yattar was distributed free through newsagents and supermarkets. The magazine closed following her death in September 2016.

== Autobiographies ==
Booth's first short autobiography, The official autobiography of Sex-Change Stephanie Anne Lloyd, was published in 1990 by TMC Publishing Ltd.

Her second autobiography, Stephanie: A Girl in a Million, co-written with Sandra Sedgbeer, was published in 1991 by Ebury Press. The Dutch translation was released in 1993, and the Czech translation followed in 1994.

== Death ==
On the evening of 18 September 2016, Booth was killed in a tractor accident at her smallholding farm on the outskirts of Corwen, Denbighshire. She was aged 70 and survived by her husband, David, along with his children Lisa and Dawn and her grandchildren: Andrew, Mathew, Grace, Rachel and Joseph.
