= San Francisco Transgender Film Festival =

Transgender film festival in California, USA

- Location: San Francisco
- Founded: 1997; 29 years ago (as Tranny Fest)
- Website: sftff.org

The San Francisco Transgender Film Festival (SFTFF) is the world's oldest transgender film festival. Originally named Tranny Fest, the Festival was co-founded by Christopher Lee and Alex Austin in 1997, with Elise Hurwitz as technical director. Lee and Austin produced the Festival until 2002; in 2003, Shawna Virago took over as artistic director.

Originally, the festival was organized largely by volunteers and operated without any government or private funding. Artistic Director Shawna Virago explained that neither government nor foundations would support transgender arts, stating "There was absolutely no funding available for transgender arts events" and that SFTFF "had to survive and thrive on our transgender smarts, sweat, and love from the community." In 2025, Virago noted that SFTFF prioritizes films that are 20 minutes or shorter, in order to screen as many films as possible from the large number of submissions.

The festival was held biennially from its founding in 1997 until 2005, when audience demand led Virago and the advisory board to transform the festival into an annual event. Before 2016, the festival's screenings and programs were held in venues including The Roxie Theater, The Bearded Lady Cafe, The Lexington Club, Mama Calizo's Voice Factory, the San Francisco LGBT Community Center, and CounterPulse. SFTFF returned to its original home — the Roxie Theater — for its 2013 festival, and has remained at the Roxie Theater ever since.

On November 10, 2016, SFTFF celebrated its 15th Anniversary Festival at the Roxie Theater with two feature-length films and 38 short films scheduled. The 2016 festival included a subtitled program for deaf and hard-of-hearing patrons for the first time, as well as ASL interpretation. The 2016 opening night feature film was FREE CeCe!, a documentary about trans woman CeCe McDonald, who was sent to a men's prison after defending herself from an attack. Directed by Jac Gares, the film also features trans actress Laverne Cox, who served as the executive producer. Among the short films playing in the 2016 Festival was the documentary Mezzo, featuring trans opera singer Breanna Sinclairé.

The 2018 San Francisco Transgender Film Festival ran November 9–11, 2018 at the Roxie Theater, San Francisco.

== See also ==
- List of LGBT film Festivals
