= Buck Angel =

American YouTuber, sex educator and former pornographic actor (born 1962)

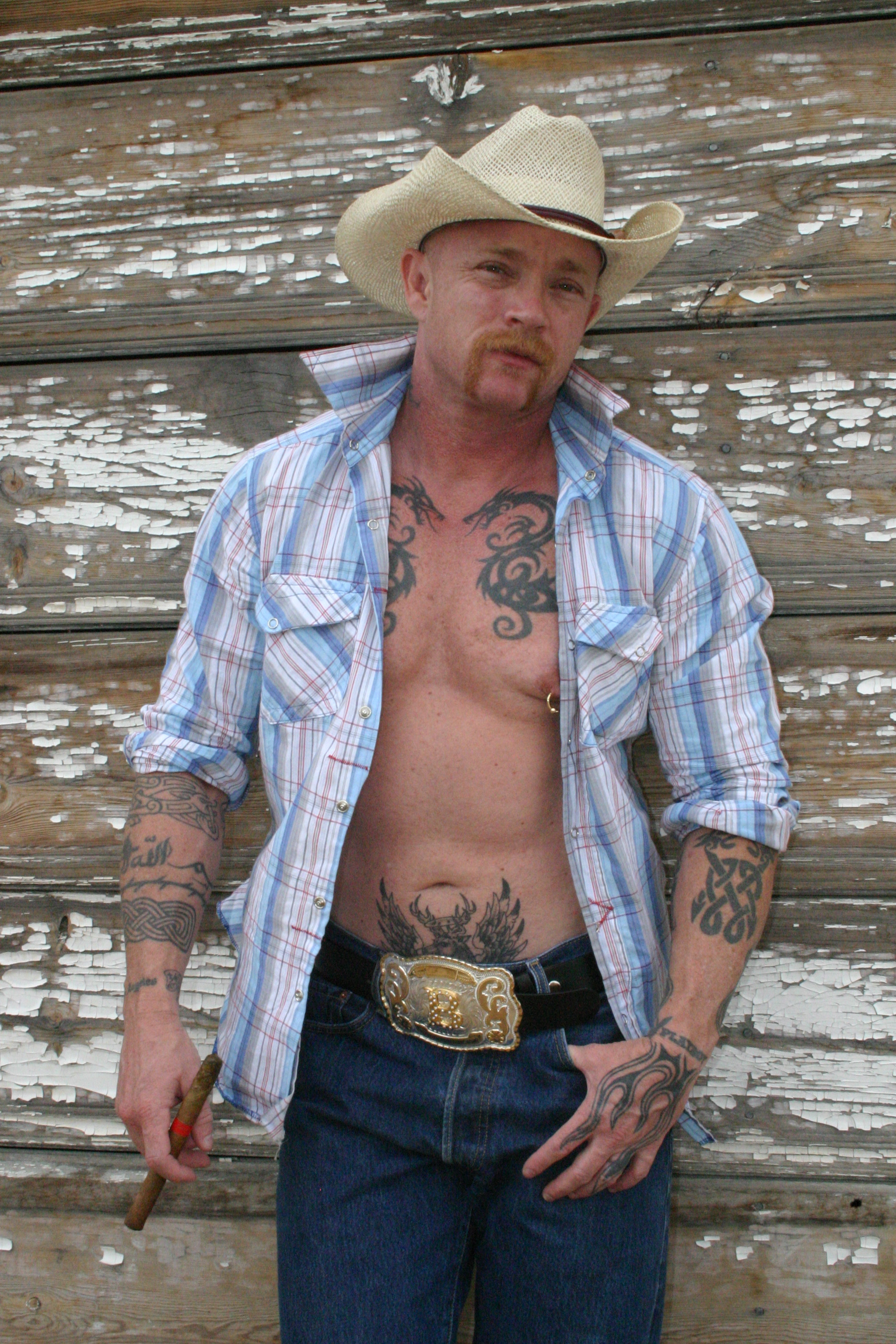
- Angel in 2007
- Born: June 5, 1962 (age 64); Los Angeles, California, U.S.
- Other name: Jake Miller
- Occupations: Adult film actor, producer, activist, educator
- Years active: 1990–present
- Children: 2
- Website: Buck Angel

Buck Angel (born June 5, 1962) is an American sex educator and former pornographic film actor and producer. He founded the media production company Buck Angel Entertainment. Angel is a transsexual man. He currently works as an advocate and educator. Angel served on the board of directors of the Woodhull Freedom Foundation from 2010 to 2016. The Foundation works to affirm sexual freedom as a fundamental human right through advocacy and education.

== Early life ==
Angel was born in the San Fernando Valley area of Los Angeles on June 5, 1962. He was born female and grew up as a tomboy; his gender-atypical behavior during childhood was generally accepted at home. Angel's home and school life became increasingly tense—especially around age 15 and 16—as his secondary sex characteristics developed. He was bullied in school due to his gender non-conforming behavior and clothing. Angel described that the psychological distress caused by being bullied made him isolated, angry, and difficult to interact with as a teen. He self-medicated with alcohol and marijuana to cope with his distress.

Angel made multiple suicide attempts in high school and was put in a psychiatric institution. He turned to running as a means of isolation. Angel was employed as a female professional model when he was 17. During this time, Angel continued to abuse illegal drugs and alcohol.

Angel was unable to find appropriate help for transitioning during his adolescent years. He eventually met a therapist who affirmed his gender instead of viewing him as a "gay woman". Angel researched various methods of medically transitioning and began to transition at the age of 28. Angel and his therapist got in contact with an endocrinologist who worked primarily with transgender women as opposed to transgender men. Angel was, as his doctor stated, "going to be [his doctor's] guinea pig" (for human subject research). Angel's doctor experimented with different doses of testosterone throughout a six-month period until they found a dose that met his needs. Eventually, he was taking 1mL doses of testosterone every 10 days.

After beginning his hormonal transition, Angel searched for a surgeon who dealt with upper-body modifications to remove his breasts. Angel also wanted to pursue genital surgery to construct a penis. Though, he felt that there was no sufficient technology at the time to create the penis that he desired and chose not to undergo genital surgery. Angel currently considers his medical transition complete. Angel chose to undergo a hysterectomy in 2011 after experiencing "debilitating cramps".

== Professional work ==
=== Adult film career ===
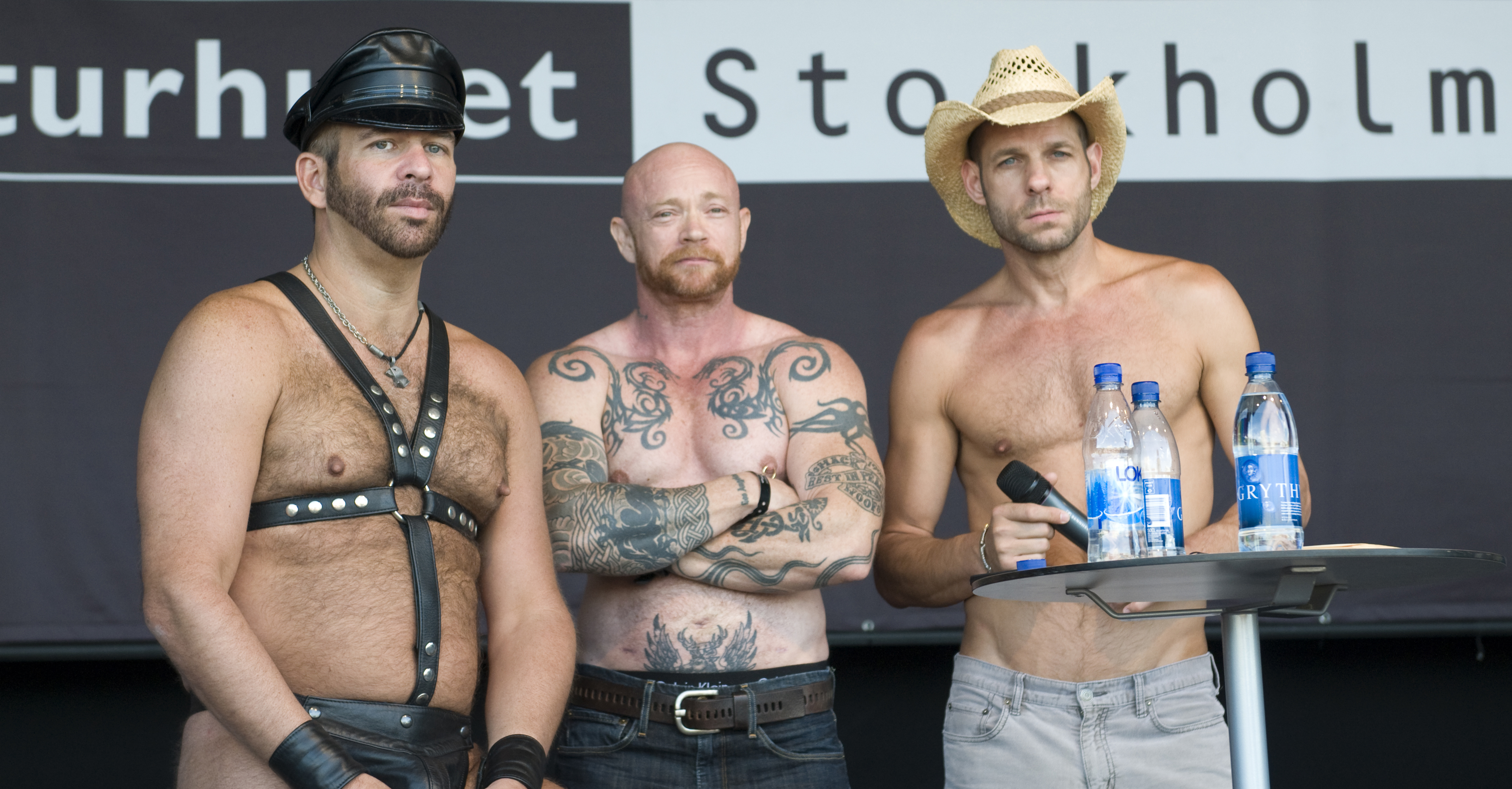
Angel (center) with Michael Brandon and Scott Spears

Angel began to produce and star in his line of adult films under the imprint "Buck Angel Entertainment". By this time, he identified and presented as male. As Angel had not undergone genital surgery, he promoted these works describing himself as "the man with a pussy", which became his trademark.

In 2005, he appeared in the Titan Media release Cirque Noir, becoming the first trans man to be featured in an all-male film produced by a company specializing in gay male porn. The same year, he performed in Allanah Starr's Big Boob Adventures (directed by transgender woman Gia Darling), which featured the first filmed sex scene between a trans woman and a trans man. The performance was nominated for "Most Outrageous Sex Scene" at the AVN Awards.

In 2007, Angel became the first and only trans man to win "Transsexual Performer of the Year" at the AVN Awards.

His 2008 performance in Buckback Mountain received nominations for "Best Alternative Release" and "Best Specialty Release" at the GayVN Awards. Angel also appears in Naked, a 2008 documentary book and film about the adult film industry by director Ed Powers. In the film, he appears in a sex scene with porn star Wolf Hudson, which mainstream photographer Justin Lubin produced.

Laura Horak lists Angel as an important early trans porn filmmaker, along with artists like Mirha-Soleil Ross, Christopher Lee, Stephanie Anne Lloyd, Morty Diamond, and Cary Cronenwett.

=== Educational work ===
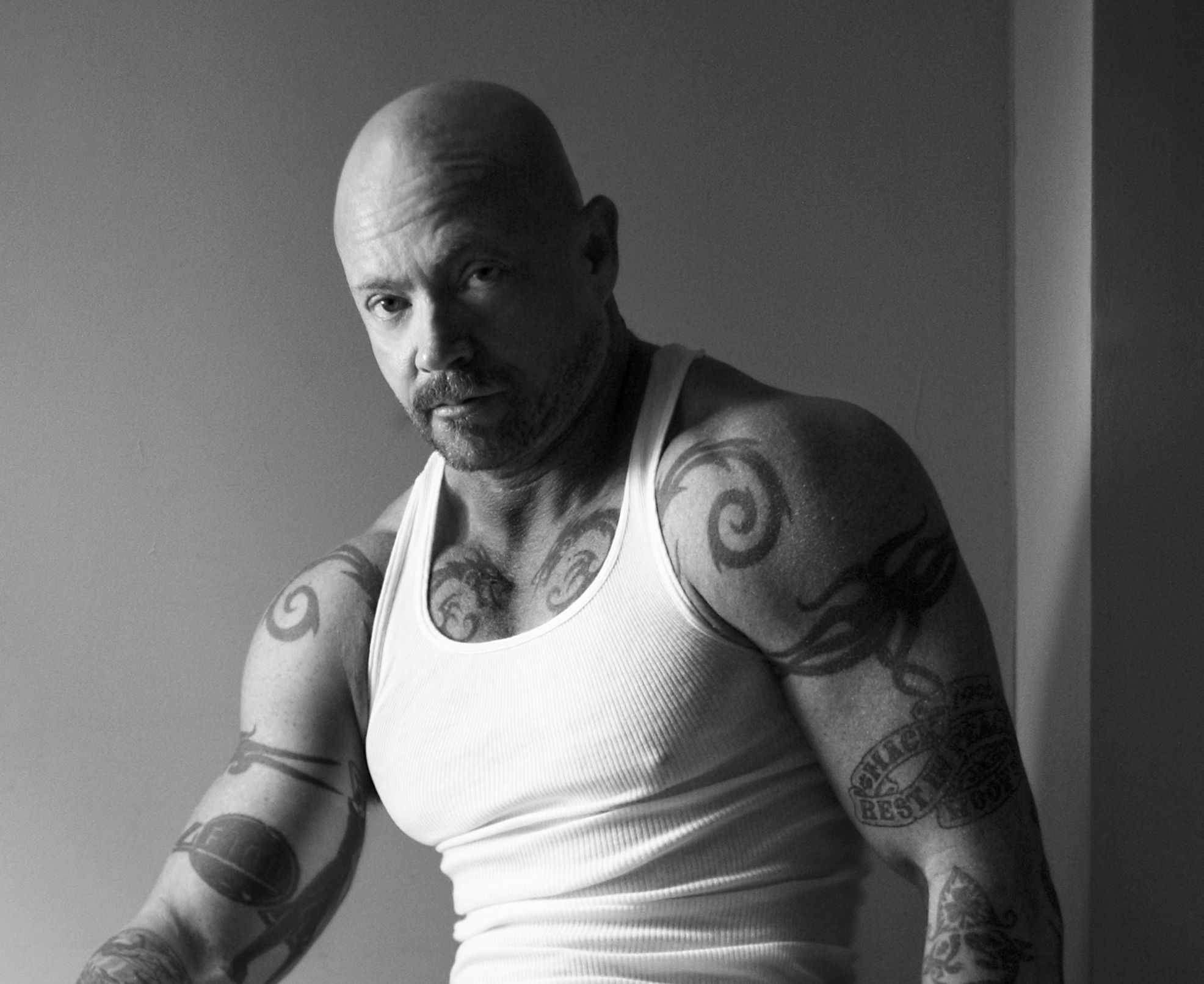
Angel in 2010

HuffPost writes that Buck Angel's work in adult entertainment "pushed the industry to rethink [its] relationship with transgender actors and create visibility for trans and gender non-conforming men."

Angel's work in porn evolved into advocacy and sex education. He found the transition between his work as a porn actor and his work as an educational role model difficult because of the stigma surrounding the adult film industry. Angel received criticism from the trans community when he began working as an educator; in HuffPost, Angel expressed that the community feared his identity in porn would misrepresent transsexual men.

In 2010, Angel had the opportunity to be a guest speaker for Ideacity, a conference billed as Canada's "premier meeting of the minds". At Ideacity, Angel discussed the physical changes and emotional adaptation he experienced because of his transition. Angel used his presentation to challenge societal ideas of what makes a man, highlighting how he was considered not to meet the requirements because of his vagina.

Between 2010 and 2015, he created an award-winning four-part porn series about trans male sexuality called Sexing the Transman XXX. The film won "Most Tantalizing Trans Film" at the Feminist Porn Awards in 2012.

In October 2010, Angel contributed to sex educator and columnist Dan Savage's "It Gets Better Project" by uploading his personal coming out story to YouTube. He has also produced multiple public service announcements on the topics of positive body image, LGBTQ family acceptance, queer people of colour, and transgender health and well-being.

In 2012, Angel became a contributor to The Feminist Porn Book, an anthology by feminist scholars and sex workers about understanding pornography and how feminists direct, act in, produce, and consume porn.

Angel decided to focus further on his work as a sex educator in 2012 and began touring the world speaking about human sexuality. His presentation, "Bucking the System", aimed to challenge traditional notions of gender. Angel also began touring Q&A sessions about his documentary, Sexing the Transman, and his autobiographical film, "Mr. Angel".

Angel made an appearance at the San Francisco Film Festival in 2012. In 2015, he made an appearance at Stockholm Pride. He has spoken at Sex Week at Yale and IdeaCity10 in Toronto.

Angel created "Trantastic Storytelling" in 2015, a service that offers opportunities for trans people to share their life experiences for educational purposes.

Angel has appeared on various talk shows, including Howard Stern, Tyra Banks, Joe Rogan, and Maury Povich's programs. He has also appeared on Secret Lives of Women in the US, This Morning in the UK, and Jensen! in the Netherlands. He has also starred as a guest on Blaire White's YouTube Channel. Many members of the trans community have been critical of Buck Angel's current appearances on conservative media and gender-critical media since 2021.

In 2022, Angel began posting weekly videos to his YouTube channel and hosting a livestream every Wednesday with the help of his producer, Seth Carlson.

In October 2023, Angel joined the Museum of Neon Art's "Light in the Dark: Queer Narratives in Neon" exhibition, participating in a panel discussion about LGBTQ+ connections to neon art and the Glendale, California community. Other panelists included museum trustee Eric Lynxwiler, filmmaker Rachel Mason, neon artist Dani Bonnet, glendaleOUT member Paul Manchester, and activist Shant Jaltorossian of GALAS LGBTQ+ Armenian Society.

=== Other activities ===
British artist Marc Quinn included a life-size sculpture of Angel in his global tour. Angel posed for Quinn's sculpture series on human transformations in 2010; the series was revealed at London's White Cube gallery. He was featured in four bronze sculptures, including two solo pieces and two pieces featuring Allanah Starr. The life-sized sculpture of Angel is now a permanent fixture at the Art Gallery of South Australia.

In 2012, Angel created a dating website for trans men called BuckAngelDating.com because "there was still no special dating site catering to the unique needs of trans men."

In 2015, Angel and Leon Mostovoy founded the cannabis brand Pride Wellness, which would donate a dollar to charity from each product sold. They ended the venture in 2021, citing competition from big corporations. In 2020, Angel launched a cannabis delivery service, Wings Of Wellness, aimed at LGBTQ customers.

In 2016, Angel partnered with Perfect Fit Brand to create a sex toy specifically for trans men. The product is meant to reduce gender dysphoria and help trans men connect with their bodies and their sexuality.

== Personal life ==
Angel is bisexual, but has never dated men, though he has had sex with men on camera.

"I learned a lot doing prostitution on the street .. I fucking survived, and that’s why I don’t want to say it’s negative, because it kept me alive. .. I’m very proud of my sex work, very proud of my pornography, and a big believer and huge activist for sex work. Because it is a job, it is a real job, and it’s something people use every day. So why do we stigmatize it so much? It makes no sense to me."

Angel married San Francisco-based dominatrix Karin Winslow (known professionally as Ilsa Strix) in 1998. In 2001, Angel filed for divorce after Winslow left him for film director Lana Wachowski, her client at the time.

Angel met his second wife, body piercer Elayne, on a dating website in 2002. The two married in New Orleans on November 17, 2003. Elayne filed for divorce in May 2014. Angel claimed that Elayne had moved $500,000 from their joint bank account and requested $2,000 in monthly spousal support. To avoid alimony payments, Elayne claimed that their marriage should not have been legally recognized as Louisiana did not recognize same-sex marriage in 2003; Angel had not undergone genital reconstructive surgery, and his birth certificate was not updated to male until after their marriage. In August 2014, the California superior court ruled that their marriage was valid due to the ambiguity in Louisiana's statute regarding sex reassignment surgery, which might include the "top surgery" that Angel had already received.

Angel later married his third wife, the artist and director Rachel Mason.

In February 2021, Angel was a witness to the shooting of Lady Gaga's dog walker and the theft of two of Gaga's French Bulldogs in Hollywood.

Angel and his wife have an adopted son and daughter.

== Awards and nominations ==
- In January 2007, Buck Angel won the AVN Award for Transsexual Performer of the Year.
- In 2008, 2009, and 2010, he was nominated for the AVN Award for Transsexual Performer of the Year.
- In April 2008, he won the Feminist Porn Award for Boundary Breaker of the Year.
- In 2012, he won the Feminist Porn Award for his film Sexing The Transman XXX.
- In 2012, he won Best FTM Performer of the Year at the first Transgender Erotica Awards.
- In 2015, he won the PORyes Award (Feminist Pornfilmpreis Europe) in Berlin.
- In 2015, he won the Ida Feldman Award at the 23rd Brazil Mix Festival.
- In 2016, he was given an Honorary Award at the Tel Aviv Film Festival.
- In 2017, he won the XBIZ Award for Specialty Product/Line of the Year.
- In 2017, he won the Outstanding Innovation Award at the AVN "O" Awards.
- In 2017, Angel and Valentina Nappi won the AVN Award for Best Transsexual Scene for the film Girl/Boy 2.

== Partial list of works ==
=== Adult films ===
- 2004: Buck's Beaver
- 2005: The Adventures of Buck Naked
- 2005: Cirque Noir
- 2005: Allanah Starr's Big Boob Adventures
- 2006: Buck Off
- 2006: V for Vagina
- 2006: The Buck Stops Here
- 2007: Even More Bang for Your Buck Vol.1
- 2008: Even More Bang for Your Buck Vol.2
- 2008: Buckback Mountain
- 2009: Ultimate Fucking Club Vol. 1
- 2009: Ultimate Fucking Club Vol.2
- 2010–15: Sexing The Transman XXX Series
- 2016: Girl/Boy (Evil Angel)

=== Documentaries ===
- 2008: NAKED
- 2012: Sexing the Transman
- 2013: Mr. Angel
- 2016: The Trans List (HBO)
- 2016: Finding Kim
- 2016: BLOWN

=== Others ===
- 1993: Music video of "Cursed Female" by Porno for Pyros
- 2015: "Technical Difficulties of Intimacy", short film
- 2016: Music video of "Bi" by Alicia Champion
- 2016: Music video of "Shivers are Proof" by Loki Starfish
