= Jake Yuzna =

American film director

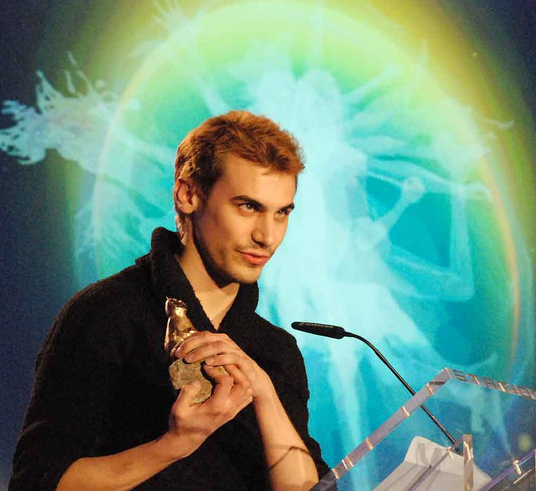
- Yuzna receiving the Teddy Jury Prize in 2010
- Born: Minneapolis, Minnesota, U.S.
- Occupations: Film director, screenwriter
- Years active: 2004-present

Jake Yuzna is an American film director, screenwriter, and curator. Their debut feature Open was the first American film to win the Teddy Jury Prize at the Berlin Film Festival and in 2005 Yuzna become the youngest recipient of funding from the National Endowment for the Arts.

Although known mainly for their work in film, Yuzna has curated several retrospectives, exhibitions and special projects. In 2010, they founded the first cinema program at the Museum of Arts and Design in New York City. Between 2011 - 2013 they organized the first fellowship, publication and conference to argue nightlife as a form of contemporary art. In addition, Yuzna has authored books on contemporary art, design, and culture as well as contributed to Artforum.

They have also curated the first American retrospectives of artists and filmmakers including Alejandro Jodorowsky, Sion Sono, Gregg Araki, Francois Sagat, and Quentin Crisp. In addition, Yuzna curated the first museum surveys of Metamodernsim, the New French Extremity, and the medium of VHS.

Yuzna is the son of poet Susan Yuzna and nephew to horror film director and producer Brian Yuzna.

== Filmography ==
Year	Film
2004	Between the Boys (short)
2005	Better Left Alone (short)
2010	Open
2017	The Knife - Live At Terminal 5
2021	The Alternative Is Hard To See (short)
2021	After America

== Awards and honors ==
- 2005: "Special Jury Award for Artistic Risktaking" from IFP
- 2010: "Teddy Jury Prize" for Open (60th Berlin Film Festival)
- 2010: "Best Narrative Feature" for Open (TLV Festival)
- 2010: "Best Performance" for Morty Diamond in Open (New Fest)
- 2012: Creative Capital Award in Filmmaking
- 2018: "Richard P. Rogers Spirit of Excellence Award" from the America Film Institute
- 2019: "McKnight Fellowship in Media Artists" from McKnight Foundation and FilmNorth
- 2020: "The Blood List" from British Horror Film Festival
- 2021: "Guggenheim Fellowship" from John Simon Guggenheim Foundation

== Publications ==
Year	Project
2013	THE FUN: The Social Practice of Nightlife in NYC
2014	NYC Makers
2022	No Joke: Humor as Resistance
2022	No Approval Required: Twin Cities Alternative Art Spaces
2023	Content and Its Discontents
2023	Solidarity in Unraveling Worlds
2023	Nightlife as Form
2024	Sound of Spaces

== Curation ==
Year	Project
2010	Zombo Italiano: The 1970s Italian Zombie Movement
2010	Blood into Gold: The Cinematic Alchemy of Alejandro Jodorowsky
2011	An Assault of Reality
2011	David Bowie, Artist
2011	François Sagat: The New Leading Man
2011	The Home Front: American Design Now
2011	Isaach De Bankolé, an Unexpected Gentlema
2011	No More Modern : Notes on Metamodernism
2011	Sion Sono: The New Poet
2011	The User: The New Auteur
2011 - 2013	THE FUN Fellowship in the Social Practice of Nightlife
2012	Adults in the Dark: Avant-Garde Animation
2012	Anna Molska, Human Material
2012	Argento: Il Cinema Nel Sangue
2012	Julika Rudelius
2012	Susan Hefuna: Vantages
2012	No Wave Cinema
2012	VHS
2013	;)
2013	After the Museum
2013	ESP TV
2013	God Help Me: Gregg Araki
2013	It Is Crispin Hellion Glover
2013	J’Adore Violence: Cinema of the New French Extremity
2013	Ladies and Gentlemen, Mr. Quentin Crisp
2013	Takeshi Murata : Mortality
2013	Without Compromise: The Cinema of William Klein
2014	NYC Makers: The 2014 MAD Biennial
2014	Life with Technology: The Cinema of Godfrey Reggio
2015	It's Hard to be Human: The Cinema of Roy Andersson
2015	The Director Must Not Be Credited: 20 Years of Dogme 95
2015	The Unseen Cinema of HR Giger
2015	Andrei Tarkovsky, Sculpting in Time
2015	Remember Film?
2018	Plastic Futures and Premillennial Tensions: 1990s Science Fiction Cinema before a New Millennium
2023	Eve Fowler: A Universal Shudder (co-curated with BF Hall)
2023	Make Sense of This: Visitors Respond to the Walker’s Collection (co-curator)
2024	Sadie Barnette: The New Eagle Creek Saloon (co-curator)
2024	Nightlife as Form
