= Grooby Productions =

American pornographic film studio

- Type: Private
- Industry: Pornography
- Founded: 1996
- Headquarters: Los Angeles, CA, United States
- Area served: Worldwide
- Key people: Steven Grooby (Founder) Kristel Penn (Marketing)
- Products: Pornographic films, Pornographic websites
- Website: www.grooby.com

Grooby Productions is a company founded in London, England in 1996 and operationally based in Los Angeles, California, that produces transgender online adult entertainment. It established itself as one of the pioneer companies of online adult transgender entertainment with its website Grooby Girls, "the first transsexual pay site with original content". The company owns a number of transgender adult websites, produces its own DVD line, and has other interests in forums, blogs and social networking in the transsexual niche genre including the Transgender Erotica Awards.

== Company history ==
Grooby traces its roots to websites started up in 1996 by Steven Grooby. The most prominent of them was his transgender site Shemale Yum which became an adult verification site and eventually a pay site. The term "shemale" is considered pejorative by the transgender community but Grooby says that at the time the site was named he didn't know any better and the site became too well branded to change the name. Other websites followed including Ladyboy-Ladyboy in 1998 which was the first website to go to Thailand to photograph ladyboys and a number of other sites featuring Brazilian, Black, Japanese and Canadian transgender women.

For a time, Grooby operated the official websites for Joey Silvera and Gia Darling, but because of creative differences these arrangements were dissolved amicably. In 2006 the company celebrated its 10-year anniversary, which included a party thrown by Allanah Starr in New York City.

In 2008, Grooby opened the SheMaleJapan.com website to focus on Japanese "newhalf" (ニューハーフ) transgender models. The concept for the website dated back to 2000 but it took eight years to find an appropriate producer in Japan. By late 2008 the company hosted 12 websites and employed 7 full-time employees at its Los Angeles headquarters and 25 people worldwide. Grooby Productions produces over 2000 photo/video sets a year for web-only release and about 10 DVD releases. In late 2009, the company relocated its offices from Honolulu to Los Angeles.

In August 2017, the company began a year-long project to change any of its products still using the term 'shemale' in their branding, with the flagship site 'Shemale Yum' being renamed as 'GroobyGirls.com' and 'Shemale.xxx' to 'Tgirls.xxx'. Marketing director Kristel Penn, was quoted as; "Grooby has been a longstanding ally of the LGBTQ community and we don’t take that responsibility lightly. I’m really excited for this rebrand, especially for our community. Whether you know our company personally or not, I believe people will see this change is a more accurate reflection of our company ethos."

By 2018 the company operates over 35 adult trans pay sites and has 50 DVD releases a year. October 2018 saw the release of trans adult performer, Domino Presley's directorial debut 'Domino Presley's House of Whores' as the first of a series, featuring Domino, Natalie Mars, Eddie Wood and the return of Jane Marie.

== Transgender Erotica Awards ==
Grooby hosts an annual event, the Transgender Erotica Awards (TEA), held each February/March in Los Angeles. A representation of transgender performers and producers in mainstream adult awards ceremonies, the annual event was created to recognize achievement in the transgender adult industry. It began as a small online-only awards show, and has since grown into a well-attended event, honoring models and performers in 21 categories and attracting attention from outside of the trans community.

== Awards and nominations ==
- 2010 XBIZ Award: GLBT Company of the Year
- 2012 XBIZ Award: Transsexual Studio of the Year (Won)
- 2013 XBIZ Award: Specialty Affiliate Program of the Year - Groobybucks (Won)
- 2016 AVN Award: Best Transsexual Movie - The Transsexual Housewives of Hollywood
- 2016 AVN Award: Best Transsexual Sex Scene - The Transsexual Housewives of Hollywood
- 2017 XBIZ Award: Trans Studio of the Year (Won)
- 2017 XBIZ Award: Trans Release of the Year - Real Fucking Girls (Won)
- 2017 XBIZ Award: Trans Release of the Year - Tranny Vice
- 2017 XBIZ Award: Specialty Affiliate Program of the Year - Groobybucks
- 2017 XBIZ Award: Adult Site of the Year - Shemale Yum (Won)
- 2017 AVN Award: Best Marketing Campaign - Real Fucking Girls
- 2017 AVN Award: Best Soundtrack - Real Fucking Girls
- 2017 AVN Award: Best Soundtrack - Shemale Shenanigans
- 2017 AVN Award: Best Transsexual Movie - Real Fucking Girls (Won)
- 2017 AVN Award: Best Transsexual Movie - Shemale Shenanigans
- 2017 AVN Award: Best Transsexual Movie - Tranny Vice
- 2017 AVN Award: Best Transsexual Movie - Trans-Tastic Four
- 2017 AVN Award: Best Transsexual Sex Scene - Real Fucking Girls, Jane Starr & Amarna Miller
- 2017 AVN Award: Best Transsexual Sex Scene - Shemale Shenanigans, Kylie Maria & Christian XXX
- 2017 AVN Award: Best Transsexual Sex Scene - Tranny Vice, Domino Presley & Robert Axel
- 2017 AVN Award: Clever Title of the Year - Shemale Shenanigans
- 2018 AVN Award: Best Transsexual Movie - All My Mothers Lovers (won)
- 2018 Xbiz Award : Best Trans Studio - Grooby Productions (won)
- 2018 Xbiz Europa Award: Trans Movie of the Year - Euro-Tgirls (won)
