= Cary Cronenwett =

American film director

Cary Cronenwett is an American transgender writer, director, and producer born in Oklahoma. His work includes the films Maggots and Men (2009), Valencia (2013) and Peace of Mind (2015). Cronenwett's films include documentary and short-film work. In addition to working behind the camera, Cronenwett has also starred in a video entitled Sexperimental 90s (2000). Cronenwett’s work has been discussed within LGBTQ film contexts, particularly in relation to trans sexuality.

== Early life and education ==
Cary Cronenwett was born in Oklahoma but moved to San Francisco, California, where he lived for most of his adult life. Cronenwett graduated from Evergreen State College in Olympia, Washington in 1993 with a Bachelor of Arts Degree. After this, he went on to study Film and Video at the California Institute of the Arts, where he graduated with a Masters of Fine Art (MFA).

== Personal life ==
Cronenwett transitioned from female to male after he moved to the Bay Area in 1993. He currently resides in Los Angeles. He was previously known as Oakie Treadwell and Cary Treadwell Cronenwett during the release of Maggots and Men.

== Career ==
=== Film ===
==== Phineas Slipped (2003) ====
Cronenwett's 2003 Phineas Slipped depicts a prep school classroom reading John Knowles's A Separate Peace and daydreaming about homosexuality.

==== Maggots and Men (2009) ====
Maggots and Men premiered on 21 July 2009 at the Castro Theatre in San Francisco as part of the LGBTQ Frameline33 Film Festival. Maggots and Men is filmed in black and white and the dialogue is in Russian. The film focuses on the Kronstadt rebellion, an uprising of sailors at the Kronstadt naval base in the aftermath of the Russian Revolution, and merges the sailor genre with the "anarchist politics" of the time and trans issues. Additionally, the film deals with concepts of masculinity in society and creates a "space in which sailors reshape meanings assigned to maleness". In an interview with the San Francisco Film Society, Cronenwett said that he feels it is important to "contextualize LGBT struggles for equality within a larger social movement" which is what he strived to do in creating this film. In addition to this, Cronenwett added that he feels this film "touches on a lot of issues that are relevant today: Labor struggles, police violence, media control".

Maggots and Men (2009) was seen to be extremely "pioneering", as it is the first film in history to cast over 50 transgender actors. When questioned about this Cronenwett said that although he had always planned to cast a large number of trans men in the film, his intent was not merely to make a film focusing on having "the most trans guys on film ever". Instead he was more focused upon "pushing boundaries and creating spaces".

==== Valencia (2013) ====
Cronenwett's 2013 film Valencia is a film adaptation of the 2000 novel by Michelle Tea. The novel by Michelle Tea won the Lambda Literary award for Lesbian Fiction in 2000. Cronenwett was one of many directors to work on this film adaption, as it was produced by a "national community of queer filmmakers". In total 21 queer and lesbian directors worked on the film adaptation of Valencia, with such notable directors as Cheryl Dunye, Joey Soloway and Courtney Trouble. The film focuses on the memoir and cult story by Michelle Tea that follows the main character 'Michelle' as she explores the "punky lesbian hipster" scene in San Francisco during the 1990s and the drama that comes with it. The film adaptation of the book was premiered at the 2008 Frameline Film Festival.

The film appeared to be extremely popular with audiences when it premiered at the Frameline Film Festival with lines "out the door". However, the film received mixed reviews from critics. Overall, on IMDb it scored 6.9/10. One review by Dennis Harvey for Variety Magazine stated that much like the original novel, the film was "driven more by style and attitude rather than by narrative" and noted that in parts the film "grows a little exhausting".

==== Peace and Mind (2015) ====
This 2015 film was both directed and written by Cary Cronenwett. It is a film adaption of the novel Kathy Goes to Haiti (1990) by Kathy Acker. Initially the film was intended to be a transgender/queer produced short film as part of a feature called Kathy Goes to Haiti. However, whilst working on this project co-producer, Flo McGarrell, died in the earthquake that hit Haiti in 2010. Cronenwett then decided to merge what had already been shot for Kathy Goes to Haiti with archival footage of Flo's life to create an "intimate personal documentary with a hybrid structure". The hybrid documentary focuses upon Flo's work within the queer and trans community in Jacmel, Haiti and the impact that he had on individuals there. The documentary which was premiered in 2015 at the LGBTQ Frameline39 Film Festival in San Francisco was described as "beautiful and tragic".

== Filmography ==
Film	Year	Director	Writer	Producer	Actor
Sexperimental 90's	2000	No	No	No	Yes
Maggots and Men	2009	Yes	Yes	Yes	No
The Thing	2011	No	No	Yes	No
Valencia	2013	Yes	No	No	No
Peace Of Mind	2015	Yes	Yes	No	No
Eisha Love (Trans in America)	2018	Yes	No	No	No

== Awards and recognition ==
In 2009, Cronenwett was awarded the 'Bay Area Guardian Goldie for Local Discovery' for his film Maggots and Men (2009).
