= Transgender Erotica Awards =

Adult entertainment award

Transgender Erotica Award (The TEA Show)
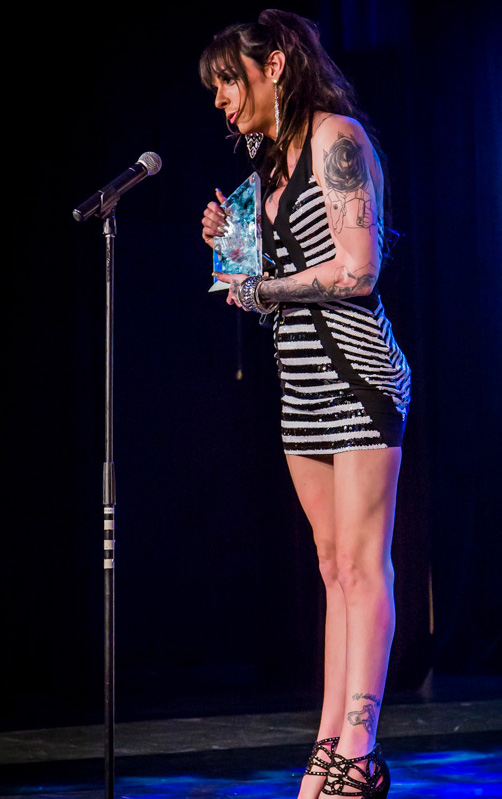
- Transgender adult model Chelsea Marie accepts a Transgender Erotica Award for Best Alternative Model of 2013 at the 6th Annual Tranny Awards.
- Awarded for: Exceptional performance in various aspects of the creation and marketing of transgender erotica.
- Sponsored by: Grooby Productions
- Location: Los Angeles, California
- Country: United States
- Presented by: Grooby Productions
- Rewards: Trophy and cash
- First award: 2009
- Website: theteashow.com

The Transgender Erotica Awards, originally known as the Tranny Awards, are a group of movie awards presented annually in the United States recognizing performances and performers in the field of transgender pornography, with an emphasis on erotic photography and pornographic movies. Organized by adult industry production company Grooby Productions, the awards were first given in 2009. Citing a poor representation of transgender performers and producers in mainstream adult awards ceremonies, the Transgender Erotica Awards were created to recognize achievement in the transgender adult industry.

The awards nominations are submitted from industry and fans from the transgender adult industry; the winners are voted for by a panel of judges, representing fans, producers, performers and professional critics. Each year there is a different panel of judges.

== History ==
In 2008, Grooby Productions sponsored the Tranny Awards to correct "the lack of recognition that the transgender erotica industry gets." Some comic confusion arose when the California Transportation Foundation, a nonprofit associated with Caltrans, also decided to call its 20th annual awards ceremony to celebrate "transportation achievement" the TRANNY Awards. The judges panel for the 1st annual Tranny Awards included transgender adult film icon Meghan Chavalier, Bob's Tgirls owner Bob Maverick, and Grooby Productions CEO Steven Grooby.

From 2010 onward, the Transgender Erotica Awards were live events. Hosted in North Hollywood, the 2nd annual Tranny Awards were held in February 2010. Judges included AVN award winning transgender producer/model Wendy Williams, Black Tgirls producer Kila Kali, and influential transgender blogger Caramel.

The 2011 Tranny Awards were held in North Hollywood in February 2011, hosted by transgender adult model Michelle Austin. Winners included Bailey Jay, Angelina Valentine, and Joanna Jet. Sponsors for the 3rd annual Tranny Awards included Shemale Strokers, SMC, and Tranny News Daily.

The 2012 Tranny Awards were hosted by RuPaul's Drag Race contestant Nicole Paige Brooks at Joseph's Cafe in Hollywood on February 19, 2012. This year marks when Grooby Productions brought on their Creative and editorial director, Kristel Penn, as the event's Executive Producer. The 4th annual Tranny Awards saw a sharp rise in number of sponsors, from the previous award show's 8 sponsors to 19 total sponsors. Sponsors included Cam4, Eros, AEBN, Kink.com, and Third World Media. Making up the judges panel were XBIZ Award winning transgender performer Jesse Flores, StrokingQueens webmaster Housekeeper, and XCritic's main reviewer Apache Warrior.

The 2013 awards were held at the Beyond the Stars Palace in Glendale and hosted by television drag celebrity Jujubee, catering to more than 200 attendees. The 5th annual Tranny Awards added some major award categories, including Best FTM Performer (awarded to Buck Angel), Best Scene Director, and Best Internet Personality. New sponsors included iFriends, Bob's TGirls, Transformation Magazine, and The UP Network. The judges panel included FTM performer James Darling, UP Network owner Ecstatic, transgender adult icon Joanna Jet, and AVN writer Darklady.

The 2014 awards were once again hosted by Jujubee at the Beyond the Stars Palace on February 16, 2014, with the after party hosted the following evening at The Dragonfly in Hollywood. New sponsors included XXX, Trans500, The Stockroom, Shemale.com, and Fame Dollars. Judges included AVN award winning performer Christian, Frank of Franks-Tgirlworld, and Centurian owner Hanna Rodgers.

With the announcement of the 7th annual award show, Grooby renamed the organization from the Tranny Awards to the Transgender Erotica Awards. Despite the continued common usage of terms such as "shemale" and "tranny" in modern pornography, the response to the event's rebranding effort has "largely been positive."

The 2015 awards were hosted by Jujubee at The Avalon on February 15, 2015, with the after party hosted the following evening at Bardot in Hollywood. New sponsors included Dr. Sinclair, GameLink, and LELO. Judges included AVN award winning performer Ashley Blue, FTM icon Buck Angel, and XCritic writer Dr. Jay.

The 2016 awards were continued with the same formula and were once again hosted by Jujubee at The Avalon with the event moving to the first weekend in March. New judges included comedian Jim Norton and FTM Performer Eddie Wood. Changes this year included splitting the Best Non-TS Performer into both Male and Female categories, with Kink.com and Grooby Productions performer Mona Wales being the inaugural winner in Best Non-TS Female. New award, Best Industry Professional went to Mark Kernes, longtime writer for AVN (magazine). Ts Madison was presented in person with a Lifetime Achievement, as was early Grooby photographer The Commander. Performer Kimberly Devine received a posthumous Lifetime Achievement Award presented by Wendy Williams.

The 2017 awards were hosted by Ts Madison as the mistress of ceremonies. This year was the first three-day event weekend in March at the Avalon in Hollywood, California. New judges included content producers Tarantino XXX and Vito Soho, in addition to transgender adult star Wendy Summers. Lifetime Achievement Award winner recipients were Wendy Williams and Natassia Dreams.

== Award categories ==
In order to be eligible to be nominated for a given year's awards, a title must have been released between October 31 and November 1 of the preceding year, but this has changed by up to two weeks in some years.

=== Production categories ===
- Best DVD
- Best Scene
- Best VR Scene
- Best Solo Website
- Best Self-Producer

=== Performer categories ===
- Best New Face
- Best Solo Model
- Best Hardcore Model
- Best FTM Performer
- Best Non-TS Performer (Male)
- Best Non-TS Performer (Female)
- Best International Model
- Fan Choice Award
- Best Internet Personality
- Ms. Unique
- Cam Performer of the Year

=== Technical categories ===
- Best Scene Director
- Best Photographer
- Best Industry Professional

=== Special/sponsored categories ===
- Lifetime Achievement Award
- Kink's Kinkiest T-Girl Domme
- Dr. Sinclair's Transcendence Award
- ManyVids' MV Trans Model of the Year
- Gender X Model of the Year
- Transational Fantasy Model of the Year
- Bob's TGirls Model of the Year

== See also ==
- List of pornographic film studios
- Grooby Productions
