= The Earth Day Special =

1990 American television special

- Written by: Armyan Bernstein; Richard Baskin; Various Writers
- Directed by: Dwight Hemion; James Burrows; Gerry Cohen; Ted Haimes; Jim Henson; Terry Hughes; Terry Lennon; Jay Sandrich; Dick Schneider; Dave Wilson
- Starring: Bette Midler; Danny DeVito; Rhea Perlman
- Voices of: Jeff Bergman
- Opening theme: "Somewhere," performed by Barbra Streisand
- Composer: Patrick Williams
- Country of origin: United States
- Original language: English

Production
- Executive producers: Armyan Bernstein; Richard Baskin; Paul Junger Witt; Lorne Michaels
- Production locations: Warner Bros. Studios, Burbank, California, U.S.
- Running time: 120 minutes
- Production company: Warner Bros. Television

Original release
- Network: ABC
- Release: April 22, 1990

The Earth Day Special is a television special revolving around Earth Day that aired on ABC on April 22, 1990. Sponsored by Time Warner, the two-hour special featured an ensemble cast addressing concerns about pollution, deforestation, and other environmental ills.

Several cutaways are made to famous fictional characters watching events unfold and discussing what can be done to save the planet.

This special was one of Jim Henson's final performances as Kermit the Frog prior to his death later that year, as well as one of Jeff Bergman's first as Bugs Bunny following the death of Mel Blanc the year prior.

The Earth Day Special was nominated for two Emmy Awards, including Outstanding Technical Direction/Camera/Video and Outstanding Lighting Direction (Electronic), in which it won for the latter.

== Plot ==
The episodic narrative, consisting of several individual skits threaded together, focused on an ailing Mother Earth, who falls from the sky and faints, and is rushed to the hospital where she is attended to by Doogie Howser and two other doctors. This special is watched by a married couple named Vic and Paula, and features a host of contemporary celebrities and characters, including Bugs Bunny, The Muppets, Emmett "Doc" Brown, and E.T.

== Cast ==
- Bette Midler as Mother Earth
- Danny DeVito as Vic
- Rhea Perlman as Paula
- Dan Aykroyd as Vic's Buddy
- Mary Kay Bergman as Allison
- Mayim Bialik as Kid
- Jonathan Brandis as Doug
- Dante Basco (uncredited)
- James Brolin as Doctor
- Chevy Chase as Vic's Buddy
- Kevin Costner as Bartender
- Rodney Dangerfield as Bachelor #3 (Dr. Vinny Boombatz)
- Geena Davis as Kim
- Dana Delany as Doctor
- Rick Ducommun as Hospital Security Guard
- Jane Fonda as Helen
- Nika Futterman as Giulia
- Morgan Freeman as Walter Samson
- Dan Gauthier as Bachelor #2
- Edan Gross as Kid
- Dustin Hoffman as Everylawyer
- Dom Irrera as Fan
- Michael Keaton as Charles McIntyre
- Jack Lemmon as Coach Stewart
- Rick Moranis as Vic's Buddy
- Edward James Olmos as Hospital Director
- Pat Riley as Bachelor #1
- Meryl Streep as Concerned Citizen
- Robin Williams as Everyman
- Robert Wuhl as Fan

=== TV and film characters ===
==== Back to the Future franchise ====
- Christopher Lloyd as Dr. Emmett Brown

==== Cheers ====
- Kirstie Alley as Rebecca Howe
- Ted Danson as Sam Malone
- Kelsey Grammer as Dr. Frasier Crane
- Woody Harrelson as Woody Boyd
- John Ratzenberger as Cliff Clavin
- George Wendt as Norm Peterson

==== The Cosby Show ====
- Tempestt Bledsoe as Vanessa Huxtable
- Lisa Bonet as Denise Huxtable Kendall
- Bill Cosby as Cliff Huxtable
- Keshia Knight Pulliam as Rudy Huxtable
- Phylicia Rashad as Clair Huxtable
- Raven-Symoné as Olivia Kendall
- Malcolm-Jamal Warner as Theo Huxtable

==== Doogie Howser, M.D. ====
- Neil Patrick Harris as Dr. Doogie Howser

==== E.T. the Extra-Terrestrial ====
- E.T.

==== Ghostbusters franchise ====
- Harold Ramis as Elon Spengler (brother of Egon Spengler)

==== The Golden Girls ====
- Bea Arthur as Dorothy Zbornak
- Estelle Getty as Sophia Petrillo
- Rue McClanahan as Blanche Devereaux
- Betty White as Rose Nylund

==== Married... with Children ====
- Christina Applegate as Kelly Bundy
- Amanda Bearse as Marcy Rhoades
- David Faustino as Bud Bundy
- Ed O'Neill as Al Bundy
- Katey Sagal as Peggy Bundy

==== Murphy Brown ====
- Candice Bergen as Murphy Brown

==== Saturday Night Live/SCTV Channel ====
- Martin Short as Nathan Thurm

=== Appearing as themselves ===
- Downtown Julie Brown
- Heavy D
- Michael Douglas
- Isaac Hayes
- Ice-T
- Magic Johnson
- Quincy Jones
- Kid 'n Play
- Jim Lange
- Queen Latifah
- Tone Lōc
- Melanie Mayron
- Dennis Miller
- Dr. Carl Sagan
- Will Smith
- Barbra Streisand
- Donna Summer
- Alex Trebek

=== Muppet performers ===
- Kevin Clash as Alligator
- Dave Goelz as Elderly Frog
- Jim Henson as Kermit the Frog
- Jerry Nelson as Robin the Frog
- David Rudman as Iguana

=== Voices ===
- Jeff Bergman as Bugs Bunny, Porky Pig, Tweety
- Don Pardo as Weekend Update Announcer (uncredited)
