= Denise Huxtable =

Fictional character who appears on The Cosby Show

- The Cosby Show/A Different World character
- Actress Lisa Bonet as Denise Huxtable
- First appearance: "Pilot" (September 20, 1984)
- Last appearance: "Cliff and Jake" (April 11, 1991)
- Created by: Bill Cosby
- Portrayed by: Lisa Bonet

In-universe information
- Full name: Denise Huxtable Kendall
- Occupation: Student; Assistant at Blue Wave Records; Wildlife photographer
- Family: Cliff Huxtable (father); Clair Huxtable (mother); Sondra Huxtable (sister); Theo Huxtable (brother); Vanessa Huxtable (sister); Rudy Huxtable (sister)
- Spouse: Martin Kendall
- Children: Olivia Kendall (stepdaughter) Ellington Kendall
- Relatives: Russel Huxtable (paternal grandfather); Anna Huxtable (paternal grandmother); Al Hanks (maternal grandfather); Carrie Hanks (maternal grandmother); Pam Tucker (cousin); Nelson Tibideaux (nephew); Winnie Tibideaux (niece)
- Nationality: American

Denise Huxtable Kendall is a fictional character from the American sitcom The Cosby Show (1984–1992), portrayed by actress Lisa Bonet. Denise also leads the first season of its spin-off A Different World (1987). The second-born child of Cliff and Clair Huxtable, Denise is a free spirit known for her eccentric clothing. Alternating between regular and recurring character, Denise appears on the sitcom on-and-off throughout its eight-year run, from its pilot "Theo's Economic Lesson" to the seventh-season episode "Cliff and Jake", for a total of 98 episodes, after which Bonet departed for the remainder of the series.

Created by comedian Bill Cosby, Denise was conceived as the Huxtable's eldest child until older sister Sondra was introduced in the show's second episode. Struggling academically, Denise drops out of post-secondary school shortly after enrolling at the historically black Hillman College. She briefly returns home before traveling to Africa, where she marries Lt. Martin Kendall, becoming stepmother to his daughter, Olivia. Bonet was cast as Denise because the producers found that she embodied some of the character's unique traits. Based on Cosby's daughter Erinn, the show's creator borrowed inspiration from their relationship for Denise's storylines exploring self-discovery and independence.

Bonet and Cosby experienced creative differences on the set of The Cosby Show, particularly regarding her career choices beyond the sitcom. Cosby developed A Different World amidst their dispute to provide the actress with a more mature platform. However, Bonet was fired from the spin-off when she became pregnant during its first season, and temporarily rejoined the cast of The Cosby Show. After leaving The Cosby Show for one year to give birth, Bonet returned as a series regular at the beginning of its sixth season until Cosby ultimately fired her during season seven.

Denise became The Cosby Show's breakout character, and resonated with young adult fans. Bonet's performance was critically acclaimed and earned her a Primetime Emmy Award nomination for Outstanding Supporting Actress in a Comedy Series in 1986. Some fans criticized Bonet's controversial role in Angel Heart (1987), claiming it disrespected Denise's wholesome image. Denise did not fare as well on A Different World; critics found Bonet uninteresting and often blamed her performance for the show's unimpressive early reviews. Revered as a fashion icon, the character's eclectic style has had a profound impact on modern fashion trends, namely boho-chic; media publications frequently rank Denise among television's best-dressed characters.

== Role ==
The Cosby Show follows the daily goings-on of the Huxtable family, an upper-middle class African American family who reside in Brooklyn, New York. The family is run by Dr. Cliff Huxtable (Bill Cosby), an obstetrician, and his wife Clair (Phylicia Rashad), a lawyer. The second eldest of their five children, Denise is a younger sister of Sondra (Sabrina Lebeauf) and an elder sister to Theo (Malcolm-Jamal Warner), Vanessa (Tempestt Bledsoe) and Rudy (Keshia Knight Pulliam). After graduating from high school, Denise leaves home to pursue post-secondary education at the fictional, historically black Hillman College, the college both her parents and grandparents had attended.

A Different World focuses on the character during her freshman and sophomore years at Hillman, revolving around her as she meets new friends and adjusts to college life. However, Denise constantly struggles with her finances and academics to the point that she ultimately drops out, becoming the first member of her family to drop out of college. After leaving Hillman, Denise returns to her childhood home in the hopes of forging her own "alternative path" towards success.

Initially interested in becoming either a fashion designer or record producer, Denise pursues several short-lived part-time jobs, from which she is either fired or quits after a brief period of time, before traveling to Africa to work as a wildlife photographer's assistant. Denise returns to the Huxtable household one year later, this time as the second wife of a divorced United States Navy officer, Lt. Martin Kendall (Joseph C. Phillips) – who she has married without her family's knowledge – and stepmother to his three-year-old daughter Olivia (Raven-Symoné). After developing an interest in teaching children with learning disabilities, Denise eventually decides to enroll at Medgar Evers College. When Martin receives a posting to a naval base in Singapore, he and Denise move there and leave Olivia in the Huxtables' care. In the series finale, Denise telephones the family from Singapore to announce that she and Martin are now expecting their first child together.

== Development ==
=== Creation and writing ===
Comedian Bill Cosby became interested in developing The Cosby Show partially because he was unimpressed with popular family sitcoms airing at the time, some of which often depicted children talking back to and disrespecting their parents without suffering serious consequences. Cosby intended for The Cosby Show's children to remain intelligent while emphasizing that "their parents were always smarter and—most importantly—in charge." Denise was intended to be the eldest of the Huxtable family's four children. However, Cosby also wanted the show to feature a character who was an example of parents Cliff and Clair having already successfully raised a college-educated child, hence the writers introduced eldest sibling Sondra, a Princeton University student, in the second episode, while Denise was relegated to the role of the Huxtables' second eldest child instead. Cosby himself is the father of five children, four daughters and one son, much like his character Cliff. All five Huxtable children are based on Cosby's own; Denise in particular was based on the creator's daughter Erinn, who was approximately Denise's same age when the series began in 1984.

According to Cosby: His Life and Times author Mark Whitaker, Cosby conceived Denise as a "hip, fashion-conscious, and a bit flaky" character. Early storylines included Denise fighting with younger sister Vanessa over the latter borrowing her sweater without permission, getting her braces removed, announcing her decision to attend college away from home, promising younger brother Theo that she is capable of sewing him a replica of an expensive designer shirt he had purchased, and tricking her parents into believing she had spent a night at a male friend's house to prove a point about their parenting style. An episode entitled "Jitterbug Break" was written to explore Cosby's interest in the ways in which different generations dance. When Denise's parents deny her permission to attend a concert, some of her friends are invited into their living room which has been converted into a dance floor by rearranging some of the furniture, allowing them room to break dance. They are eventually joined by a pair of Cliff and Clair's swing dancing friends, and a dance battle ensues between the younger and older dancers. In one of the show's more serious episodes, Denise struggles with the revelation that a teenage friend of hers is pregnant. Several episodes revolving around Denise explore her boyfriends and dating life.

=== Casting and portrayal ===
Denise is portrayed by American actress Lisa Bonet, whose acting experience prior to The Cosby Show had been limited to television commercials and a guest appearance on the medical drama St. Elsewhere. Casting the role of Denise, who was intended to be the Huxtable's family's eldest child at the time, was a relatively quick process. Bonet first auditioned for the show's directors, followed by its producers, then finally Cosby himself and the network executives. Cosby immediately liked then-15 year-old Bonet because she had been wearing makeup on only one side of her face, already demonstrating some of the quirky qualities Cosby had envisioned for the character. Impressed by the young actress' strong sense of self, producer Marcy Carsey said Bonet wore braces, a "real kid" hairstyle, and "off-center" clothing to her audition, which were very similar to what the creators had always envisioned for Denise. They described Bonet as a young woman who refuses to be anything but herself based on the actress' natural line delivery, which Cosby found refreshing compared to the "stagey" acting most child auditionees relied on. According to People, Denise "didn't fit into any mold, a role that seemed made for Lisa Bonet".

The role had originally been offered to Whitney Houston, but she turned it down because the five-year contract would have interfered with her aspiring singing career. The candidates were eventually narrowed down to three finalists for each child character, including Bonet for Denise, although she felt discouraged after overhearing one of her competitors say her braces will cost her the part. After Bonet learned that she had in fact been chosen for the role from director Jay Sandrich, she met with Cosby one more time, who admitted to liking her braces. Once Bonet was cast, the writers began to incorporate some aspects of her personality into her character, although her own fashion sense and behavior is viewed as more "outlandish" than Denise's. Costume designer Sarah Lemire was granted a weekly budget of $3000 to outfit the show's characters, and frequently risks with Bonet's wardrobe in particular. Lemire said she would have liked to have been "more outrageous with [Bonet's] hair and hats", but limited herself because she had little control over the actress' hair. Praising Bonet's own taste in clothes, Lemire likened costuming her to "dressing myself if I was 20 years younger". Bonet often selected her character's outfits herself with little input from the wardrobe department.

Denise was Bonet's first major television role. Being of mixed ethnicity, her character's upbringing "as a teen-ager in a well-adjusted, upper-middle-class black family" is remarkably different from how Bonet grew up, which took some time for the actress to adjust to; she never knew her father and was raised by her mother in a lower-middle-class, mostly white neighborhood. However, Bonet credits her role on The Cosby Show with "helping resolve her own identity crisis". Bonet described the show's environment in 1987 as "the perfect family, where you go to work, you get tired of them and you go home", and at the time likened working alongside Cosby to "learning from a master", from whom she often sought both professional and personal advice. Actress Phylicia Rashad, who portrays Bonet's on-screen mother Clair, described Bonet as "one of the best young actresses today ... She is phenomenal for someone of her years".

=== Creative conflicts and A Different World ===
Bonet had a tense working relationship with both Cosby and the show's producers throughout most of her time on the series. Although the co-stars are reported to have gotten along during The Cosby Show's first three seasons, their dispute first became public in 1987. According to Kara Kovalchik of Mental Floss, Bonet's alleged unprofessionalism and argumentativeness aggravated Cosby, reportedly being consistently late or absent from tapings. Bonet had first expressed interest in pursuing more dramatic roles midway through the show's first season, intending to leave the series after only two years. Aged 19 at the time, she decided to make her film debut as Epiphany Proudfoot in the controversial horror film Angel Heart (1987), a role that required Bonet to film a sex scene with actor Mickey Rourke. By this time, Denise had already become the show's most popular character, while Bonet's fame increased when the film was initially assigned an X rating for its graphic content. Although her role shocked several of The Cosby Show fans and Cosby himself, Cosby claims he did not mind Bonet's decision to appear in the film, maintaining that they have a strong friendship and would have objected had he felt otherwise. Bonet confirmed that she sought Cosby's advice when she was offered the role because she trusted him to see her potential beyond the sitcom. Despite granting her his approval, Cosby refused to see the film. The show's producers and NBC executives declined to comment on Bonet's decision, citing "what Bonet did off the Cosby set was her business".

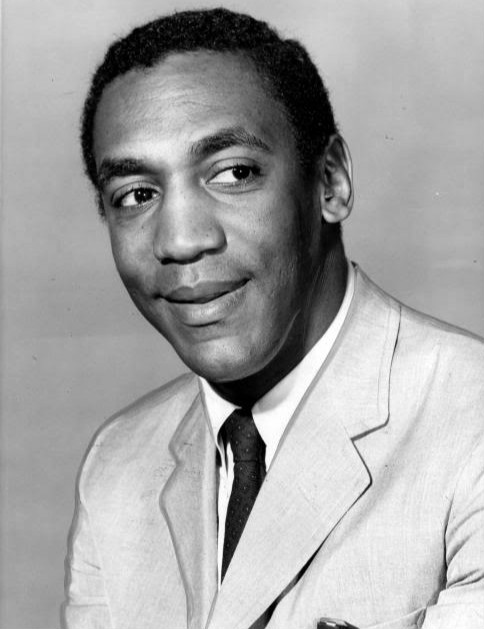
Bonet's difficult professional relationship with her on-screen father, comedian Bill Cosby, resulted in the creation of her own spin-off series, A Different World.

Tensions between Bonet and Cosby worsened when the actress posed nude for Interview and Rolling Stone magazines to promote Angel Heart. Bonet insisted that she was not trying to harm Denise's reputation by posing nude, but rather "felt obligated to my career and my (freedom of) artistic choice". After learning about the photograph's negative press, Cosby purchased a copy of Interview for himself, and released a statement defending the photographs while complimenting Bonet's talent and maturity in spite of her young age. The media continued to circulate Bonet's photographs heavily, which is reported to have fueled a highly publicized dispute between the actress and Cosby towards the end of the 1980s. Cosby expressed concern over how the photographs would affect The Cosby Show's younger audience and Bonet's younger cast mates. Although producers feared the scandal would tarnish "the squeaky-clean Huxtable image", Cosby decided to provide Bonet with her own television series, a spin-off of The Cosby Show called A Different World. The network agreed that Bonet was ready to lead her own show, a revelation by which she was surprised.

A Different World originally followed an entirely different premise and main character, intending to star Meg Ryan as Maggie Lauten – a white student attending a historically black college. Marisa Tomei replaced Ryan when the latter left the project to focus on her film career. Maggie was re-written into the supporting role of one of Denise's roommates, while the plot was revised to focus on Bonet's character as she adjusts to college and living away from home for the first time. The only Cosby Show cast member to receive their own spin-off, the media speculated that A Different World was developed into a star vehicle for Bonet because she frequently protested Cosby's family-oriented direction for The Cosby Show; Emily VanDerWerff of The A.V. Club agreed that the spin-off was revised as a means of removing Bonet from The Cosby Show "in a way that would bruise fewer egos". Additionally, casting Bonet in A Different World allowed "viewers to explore the new environment through the eyes of a familiar character".

Bonet relocated from New York, where The Cosby Show was taped, back to her hometown of San Francisco, California to film A Different World. A Different World's pilot revolves around Denise as she struggles to pay her dormitory fees while meeting her new roommates, Jaleesa Vinson (Dawnn Lewis) and Maggie, respectively. In addition to a diverse group of friends, Denise would also meet and be influenced by new friends and teachers "with different perspectives on life", allowing the character to "grow in profound and interesting ways". The majority of the first season revolves around Denise, the show's lead character at the time, struggling to maintain her grades. However, Bonet had a fraught working relationship with season-one executive producer Anne Beats, to the point where Cosby had threatened to fire Bonet lest she correct her behavior, although Beats ultimately departed instead.

=== Return to The Cosby Show ===
While appearing on A Different World, Bonet married musician Lenny Kravitz in 1988, and soon became pregnant with their child. Fearing how Cosby would react to an on-set pregnancy, Bonet first confided in producer Debbie Allen, who suggested that they approach Cosby about the pregnancy together. Allen suggested that Bonet's pregnancy be written into the series, explaining that it would provide an opportunity to show an upper-class woman having a child while choosing to remain unmarried. Cosby and some of the show's other producers did not want to explore teen pregnancy via A Different World's main character, fearing it would send the wrong message. Cosby in particular was strongly opposed to the idea of a seemingly wholesome Huxtable child experiencing an unplanned pregnancy and becoming an unwed mother. Allen was reportedly upset with Cosby over his decision but understood Denise's pregnancy would alter his vision for both series. Meanwhile, producer Susan Fales claims Bonet had wanted to return to The Cosby Show regardless, and felt Denise's pregnancy would have posed challenges such as how would she have fun in college while pregnant, and by whom she had gotten pregnant.

Bonet was fired from A Different World before its second season aired; Cosby reinstated her into The Cosby Show's fifth season, while A Different World underwent several changes to adjust to her departure. At first, Cosby struggled with how to approach Denise's return, but ultimately decided to borrow some real-life inspiration from his own daughter Erinn, who had also dropped out of college "to find herself". They reworked Denise's storyline to reflect children remaining loved by their parents despite disappointing them sometimes. Erinn had attended Spelman College, the historically black institution upon which Hillman is based. The episode where Denise returns home premiered on October 6, 1988. Since Cosby did not want to add an infant character to the series, the show concealed Bonet's pregnancy using loose-fitting clothing, large coats, furniture, and grocery bags. To allow Bonet time to have her baby, her character was written out of the series for a year by having Denise announce she has dropped out of Hillman to pursue a job opportunity as a wildlife photographer's assistant in Africa (after having briefly attempted to become a fashion designer or record producer). Denise was demoted from main to recurring character for the remainder of the season.

Despite NBC producers alluding to the possibility of Bonet returning to A Different World permanently post-pregnancy, Bonet would only make one final appearance on the spin-off, a cameo during its third season, by which time the series had shifted focus to other characters. Allen created an entirely new character, Freddie Brooks (Cree Summer), to replace Bonet as the show's "earthy, bohemian" character. In the wake of Bonet's departure, Tomei was also fired and her character written out, despite Allen's original intentions to retain "the dynamic of having a white girl in a black college". Jasmine Guy, who played schoolmate Whitley Gilbert, said she threatened to quit A Different World during its first season because she felt Bonet had been mistreated by producers. Guy also claims Bonet hired additional security because she felt unsafe on-set. Although A Different World would remain a spin-off of The Cosby Show, Denise's absence severed connections between the two shows apart from the fact that Hillman is her father's alma mater.

=== Departure ===
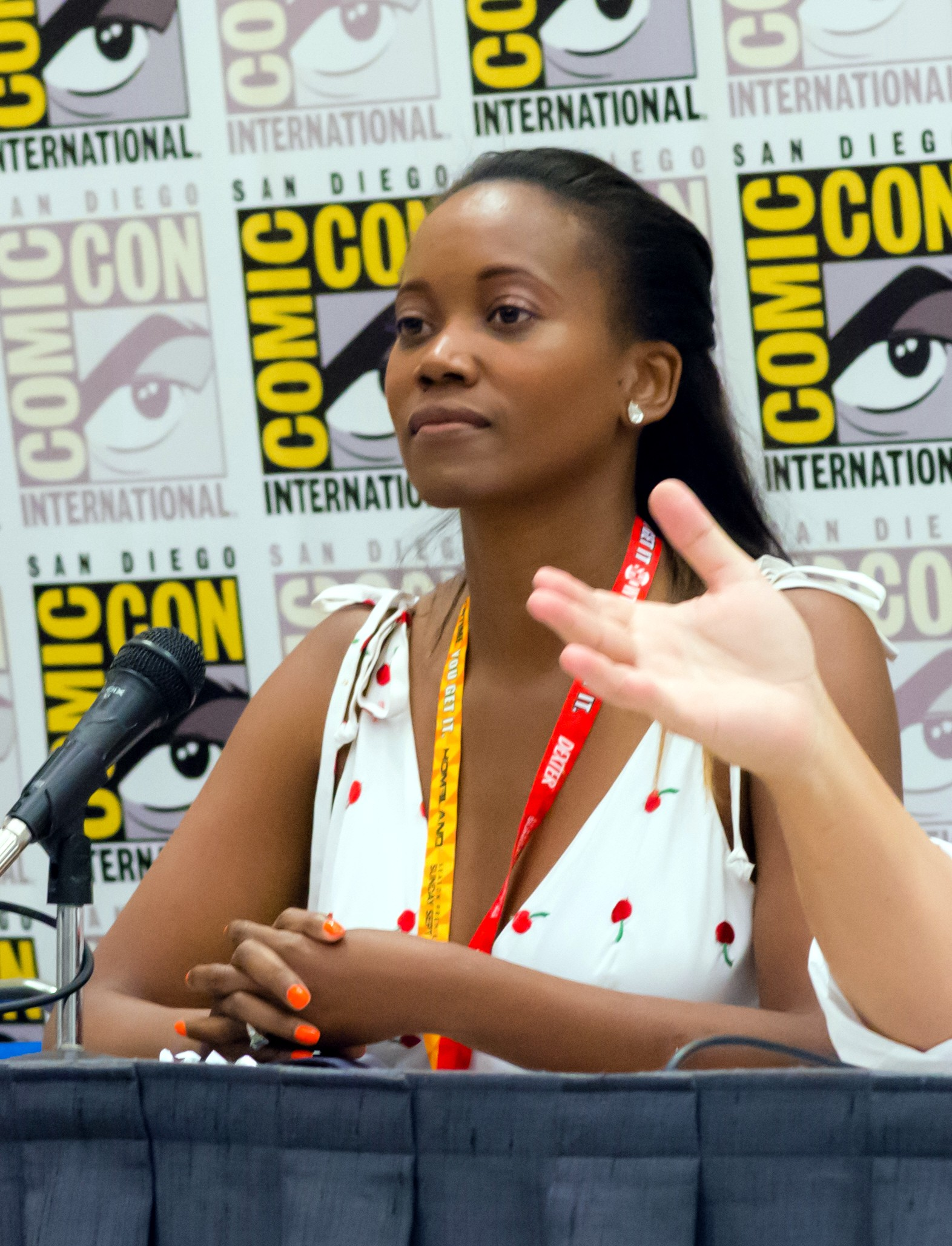
Following Bonet's exit, some media outlets dubbed actress Erika Alexander, who was introduced as the Huxtable family's distant cousin Pam Tucker, as her "replacement".

Having spent the majority of season five away on maternity leave, Bonet resumed her role on The Cosby Show full-time upon after giving birth to daughter Zoë Kravitz; Denise returns home after secretly marrying Lt. Martin Kendall (Joseph C. Phillips), a Naval officer she meets in Africa, becoming stepmother to his three-year-old daughter, Olivia (Raven-Symoné). Philips had guest starred in an early episode of The Cosby Show as one of Sondra's love interests before he was recast as Denise's husband. The sixth season premiere "Denise: The Saga Continues", in which Denise returns home to Brooklyn unannounced and introduces her parents to her new family, established the sitcom's season premieres as episodes in which a Huxtable child would share surprising news with their parents. Bonet would continue to appear on the show regularly over the next several episodes until Cosby fired her altogether at the end of season seven, citing "creative differences". The season's 24th episode "Cliff and Jake", which aired on April 11, 1991, marks Bonet's final appearance on the show. Cosby claims that he fired Bonet because The Cosby Show's material was no longer challenging for her, blaming himself for her character lacking development and maturity. However, he commended Bonet's acting talent. Cosby then decided to divide Bonet's screen time among new young actors "on the show who are working hard, studying so hard and really deserve a shot during what will be our final year." Introduced during the show's later seasons, Pam Tucker (Erika Alexander), a cousin of the Huxtable family, is considered to be a "replacement" for Denise; StyleBlazer believes that Pam was created because the sitcom "needed another character to play a free-spirited problem child."

Bonet developed a reputation for being difficult to work with on The Cosby Show. Although nearly every main and recurring character who played a significant role on the series returned for The Cosby Show's finale "And So We Commence", which revolves around Denise's younger brother Theo graduating from New York University, Bonet was not invited back to make a final appearance on the show after having been fired the previous year. Her character is, however, mentioned and used sparingly throughout the episode. Unseen, Denise calls her family on the telephone from Singapore to announce that she is pregnant with her and Martin's first child, and everyone receives an opportunity to congratulate her except Cliff. Bonet appeared on The Cosby Show on and off from 1984 to 1987, and from 1989 to 1991, for a grand total of 98 episodes between the ages of 17 and 24. She is credited as a main cast member from seasons one to three and six to seven, and a recurring cast member during seasons four and five.

According to PopCrunch, Bonet's feud with Cosby "has become just as legendary as the show" itself. Bonet has famously continued to avoid attending Cosby Show-related reunions and specials in the years since the show has ended. When Bonet declined to attend The Cosby Show: A Look Back, a retrospective television special hosted by NBC in 2002, she explained, "The whole experience and energy behind it felt disingenuous and motivated by corporate profit. I felt devalued and disrespected." When the Cosby Show cast was honored with the Impact Award at the 2011 TV Land Awards, Bonet was noticeably absent, citing "scheduling conflicts" as the official reason for her nonattendance. Actor Malcolm-Jamal Warner, who portrays Bonet's on-screen brother Theo, said "Lisa has always danced to the beat of her own drummer, which has worked for and against her"; Warner recalled being "surprised" when Bonet once attended a smaller-scale reunion that featured him and on-screen sisters Tempestt Bledsoe (Vanessa) and Keshia Knight Pulliam (Rudy) for Nickelodeon's Favorite Huxtable Contest. However, he admitted he admires Bonet for following her passion. Bonet and Tomei, both of whom were fired during the first season of A Different World, have remained close friends.

In 2018, Bonet, who has had little to no comment about the sexual assault allegations made by several women against Cosby, revealed that she had always felt a "type of sinister, shadow energy [that] cannot be concealed" during her time working with Cosby. She maintains that her memories of her experience on the show have not been influenced by the allegations, insisting, "No, it's exactly as I remember it".

== Characterization and fashion ==
According to Eudie Pak of Biography, Denise was first introduced "as the popular girl with ever-changing hair and fashion". Martin Gitlin, author of The Greatest Sitcoms of All Time, described the character as "Stunningly attractive ... independent, intelligent, and proud." Denise eventually became known as "the wild child" of the Huxtable family as a result of her rebellious nature, outspokenness, eccentric clothing and tendency to date boys her father does not approve of. Josh Axelrod of College Magazine dubbed Denise "Cliff Huxtable's most frustrating child", standing apart from her siblings due to her inherent flightiness and restlessness. As "the most mellow Huxtable kid with a slightly boho style", the character also dresses in a manner that is distinguished from the moderate way in which her siblings dress. Denise's style has been described as bohemian and boho-chic. Developing a reputation as "a stylish dresser", the character frequently makes bold fashion statements, particularly via her vast assortment of hats and accessories, and variety of hair styles. Kamille Cooper, contributing to Vibe, described the character's wardrobe as "synonymous with 90's trends and groovy 70's-inspired prints–even more so perpetuated by her carefree persona", identifying "her ability to mix prints and patterns effortlessly to embellished adornments on fedoras and blazers". Denise typically wears oversized smocks, harem pants, jumpsuits, large blazers and head wraps with vibrant patterns, as well as denim and vintage tops. Glamour contributor Tracey Lomrantz Lester wrote that, in addition to fitted vests, the character dons "some of the most memorable headwear I've ever seen on TV." Alison Feldmann, writing for The Etsy Blog, described Denise as "fearless when it came to her appearance and could get away with seemingly anything". Refinery29 contributor Fara Prince agreed that Denise "got away with wearing the craziest outfits and changed her hairstyle constantly, all while maintaining that relaxed, cool-girl vibe." Brit + Co writer Rachel Aschenbrand-Robinson believes that the character's choice of clothing gave viewers the impression "that she actually gave no f**ks what anyone thought of her look."

College Fashion cited the character's interest in experimenting with geometric patterns, bright colors and a variety of textures. Bustle's Cherise Luter believes that Denise's wardrobe "expressed [her] inner rebel." Jamie Broadnax of Black Girl Nerds identified Denise as a hipster, writing that the character was "a hipster before the word hipster was even a thing" due to her unconventional clothing choices and tendency to avoid imitating others, as well as her own method of doing things that she incorporates into the way she dresses. Denise's sense of fashion is also reflected in her hair; the character experiments with various hairstyles throughout The Cosby Show's run, ranging from "androgynous short hair to natural curls [and] waist-length dreads." In later seasons, the character "exhibited more of a hippy-chick free spirit" closer to the way in which Bonet dresses outside of The Cosby Show. Denise's sense of fashion endures during her enrollment at Hillman. Andrea Linett, author of I Want to Be Her!: How Friends & Strangers Helped Shape My Style, described the character's wardrobe as "drapey and Japanese-y and so perfectly '80s", which she believes only improves once she transitions from The Cosby Show to A Different World. On the spin-off, Denise often gravitates towards menswear, high-waisted pants, and vintage clothing. Richard Pfefferman, author of Strategic Reinvention in Popular Culture: The Encore Impulse, described Denise as "Young, hip, trendy and colorful". Pfeifferman continued to describe the character as a "fun-loving, fashion-conscious, light-hearted teenage girl" who was "perfectly poised for gradual transformation into a serious and more thoughtful adult" on A Different World. Tara Ariano, author of Television Without Pity: 752 Things We Love to Hate (and Hate to Love) about TV, wrote that Denise embodies "the height of sophisticated teenager-hood" due to her "inexhaustible supply" of jewelry, blouses and leggings. According to Bonet, her character showed audiences "that it's okay to be a freak". However, Racked's Nadra Nittle argued that Denise remains rather "straight-laced" despite her artsy, unconventional wardrobe consisting of high-waisted trousers and tropical shirts.

Denise has been identified as a "drifter". Author Mark Whitaker wrote in his book Cosby: His Life and Times that the character resembles a "laconic mixture of sweetness and sarcasm that captured the ironic detachment that was becoming a hallmark of Generation X." Each Huxtable child "represents a different aspect on life." As a rebel who has been described as the Huxtable's "most troublesome child", Denise was often depicted as the opposite of Sondra, struggling to perform well academically unlike her older sister; Denise receives five Ds, one C and seven incompletes during her time at Hillman. While Sondra successfully graduates from Princeton University, Denise drops out of Hillman, travels to Africa and marries a Navy lieutenant instead, representing "that children don't always grow up how parents expect", according to the Ames Tribune. Clover Hope of Jezebel agreed that the character "is determined to be independent—with no discipline or follow-through—and doesn't want her parents, Cliff and Clair Huxtable, to pay her way through college." Denise also stands apart from her college friends by being a "quirky, naive, indecisive flower child." Mike Vago of The A.V. Club observed that the Huxtable home begins to suffer from "Full Nest Syndrome" once Denise returns home from Africa, married and with a step child. Writing for the same publication, Joshua Alston believes that Bonet's real-life "earth-mother persona was integrated into the character, and became a riff on what rich-kid rebellion might look like for a wealthy black family." Denise has been nicknamed the Huxtable's "prodigal daughter" by the media.

== Reception ==
=== The Cosby Show ===
Denise was quickly established as an audience favorite during the show's earliest seasons, which Mental Floss writer Kara Kovalchik attributed to her "typical teenage carefree attitude and her cutting-edge fashion sense". Denise ultimately became the show's most popular character, with her unique fashion sense becoming a trademark of the series. Essence and Abby White of the Nashville Scene agreed that the character's clothes immediately captured fans. White also joked that being one of Denise's three less popular sisters "must have really sucked". Entertainment critic Ken Tucker said "the clever contrast between Bonet's sloe eyed sexiness and her teenybopper sense of humor ... made her the standout member of Bill Cosby's clan". Beloved by fans until her departure, Bonet became a "media darling", by whom she was nicknamed "America's Sweetheart". Idolized by teenage boys, she received the most fan mail out of the show's cast. Adored by millions of fans, Bonet's popularity grew almost overnight, soon establishing her as the show's breakout star and a household name. Fans swarmed the actress in public, often approaching her for fashion advice. Karen Heller of The Philadelphia Inquirer dubbed Bonet their "sartorial role model". Girls were drawn towards her bohemian sense of fashion, while boys found her to be very attractive. According to Hollywood.com, Bonet "struck a chord" among The Cosby Show fans with "her ethereal beauty and quiet strength". Vibe's Greg Tate believes Bonet's performance "won the heart of just about every young black woman who didn't fit the mold of debutante, fly girl or hoochie mama". Hillary Crosley Coker of Jezebel described Bonet as "the coolest of The Cosby Show cast", while Refinery29's Kara Kia believes Bonet and Denise were equally "admired for [their] rebellious, elusive approach to celebrity". In "An Ode To Lisa Bonet As Denise Huxtable", Uproxx contributor Greg Whitt praised the actress: "I loved how you were never willing to mute your personality in a house full of squares. Your hair was short and untamed. Your outfits never matched but always worked ... You were sexy before I knew what sexy was. Vanessa was too annoying, and Rudy was too young, but, Denise ahem Lisa, you were the one".

Julee Wilson of HuffPost described the character as "head-strong yet lovable". Rebekah Williams, writing for Her Campus, called Denise "charming". In a retrospective review of the series, Funny or Die dubbed Denise "your Tumblr crush", writing, "Girls wanted to be her. Boys wanted to be with her. Boys also probably wanted to be her". Writing for The Atlantic, Joe Reid ranked Denise the best Huxtable child, praising Bonet's performance and describing Denise as "equal parts cool and disaster, without ever selling out either part". Writing for the same publication, Kevin O'Keefe ranked Denise fifth because he struggled to "understand her motivations", finding her relationship with straight man Martin unconvincing due to her free-spirited nature. However, O'Keefe admitted that he enjoyed her role in the episode "A Shirt Story". The episode is often positively reviewed as one of the character's best, while writer Aisha Harris declared it the show's best episode. Bonet's performance throughout the series received critical acclaim. Writer Kaitlyn Greenidge said her "ability to play dreamy and comedic at the same time, was a presence that hadn’t been seen before in American media, certainly not in the workshopped-to-death milieu of network sitcoms". Bonet was nominated for a Primetime Emmy Award for Outstanding Supporting Actress in a Comedy Series at the 38th Primetime Emmy Awards in 1986.

Bonet's controversial role in Angel Heart was met with strong backlash from devoted Cosby Show fans, some of whom felt that she had betrayed Denise's "wholesome" image. Some media headlines, such as USA Today's "X has Cosby kid's film on spot", gave readers the impression that "all 77 million weekly watchers are outraged by the behavior of their little Denise", according to Trustman Senger of The Washington Post. The fact that Bonet, a Cosby Show cast member, had been cast in a sex scene with co-star Mickey Rorke garnered far more media coverage than whether or not the film deserved the X rating it had been assigned. Maintaining that he had never seen an episode of The Cosby Show prior to casting Bonet, Angel Heart director Alan Parker admitted he was unprepared for the public's reaction, elaborating, "I was naive not to realize ... what she represented within that show was maybe a role model for young black American kids." When the film was released, an overwhelming number of The Cosby Show fans asked Bonet to reveal what Cosby thought of her performance. Cosby eventually said that he was not particularly fond of Bonet's role in the film, which he dismissed as "a movie made by white America that cast a black girl, gave her voodoo things to do and have sex". Envisioning Black Feminist Voodoo Aesthetics: African Spirituality in American Cinema author Kameelah L. Martin believes that Cosby's avoidance of the film only augmented the controversy surrounding Bonet's role. Victor Valle of the Los Angeles Times wondered if the sex scene would harm Bonet's "wholesome TV image" on both The Cosby Show and the then-upcoming A Different World. Maintaining that she had been unaware of Denise's wholesome reputation prior to appearing in Angel Heart, Bonet insisted "My obligation wasn't to Denise. I felt obligated to myself and my career."

=== A Different World ===
Bonet was one of the decade's most popular actresses, and A Different World initially attempted to capitalize on her fame by highlighting Denise. Although the spin-off received high ratings, critics were largely unimpressed by its first season, many of whom blamed Denise's personality and Bonet's performance for the show's poor reviews. Journalist Mark Harris said "Bonet proved hollow as the center of a sitcom", and Ed Siegel of The Boston Globe felt the show hid her talent. Television critic Jeff Jarvis accused NBC of diluting The Cosby Show by removing Bonet, "only so she could star in a watery, bland series". Jarvis continued, "I only hope NBC has the sense to forgive Bonet and welcome her home, where she's always been terrific, on Cosby". The Chicago Tribune's Clifford Terry and the Toronto Star's Jim Bawden were among several critics who agreed Bonet was not compelling enough to carry an entire series, with the latter questioning why she had been granted her own show over who he described as her more talented Cosby Show castmates. Similarly, Robin Oliver of The Sydney Morning Herald felt Bonet had not done enough comedy on The Cosby Show to warrant her own sitcom, but understood she "is liable to attract a certain voyeuristic following". Journalist Emily St. James agreed that the actress "wasn't yet ready to carry a show", blaming her "sleepy demeanor and subdued line readings" for encouraging audiences to gravitate towards more interesting supporting characters. Emily Nussbaum, television critic for The New York Times, reviewed Denise as "so diffident she seemed barely there", and Scott Weinberg of DVD Talk said Bonet's acting discouraged him from completing the first season. Gene Seymour of the Philadelphia Daily News said that while the character was captivating on The Cosby Show, she was a boring college student compared to her friends, suggesting that Bonet watch The Mary Tyler Moore Show "for pointers on how to be a strong, vital center for a comedy ensemble". The Pittsburgh Post-Gazette's Ron Weiskind found her less interesting than her co-stars Dawnn Lewis or Marisa Tomei.

Some reviewers were more sympathetic. Jeneé Osterheldt of The Kansas City Star appreciated A Different World for not depicting Denise as star pupil. Television critic Marvin Kitman credited Bonet with making the show work, saying she approaches her performance with "deceptively different style of comedy" from traditional comediennes, despite the limitations of her role. Bill Kelley of the South Florida Sun Sentinel said the actress "gamely does her best" despite the show's flaws "and remains as appealing as she is on Cosby". Tucker said Bonet "makes the show bearable" by portraying "herself as an idealized portrait of '80s college youth". Writer and executive producer Susan Fales defended Bonet's acting: "the character was far more at fault [than Bonet]. Denise was not very interesting, and we were asked to make her into Mary Tyler Moore or Tinkerbell, always bringing everyone together. We couldn't."

Critics and audiences found that the character was constantly being upstaged by Whitley Gilbert (Jasmine Guy). After Bonet's departure, Whitley replaced Denise as A Different World's main character, and the series underwent significant revisions to refocus on her and other supporting characters. Although the producers expected viewers to miss Denise, critics conceded that Whitley offered better television. Linda Hobbs of Vibe reported that A Different World's "success only grew after Bonet left". However, some fans lamented Denise's absence. AfterEllen contributor Dana Piccoli found it difficult to enjoy A Different World's subsequent seasons without Bonet. Recognizing Denise's characterization on A Different World among 752 Things We Love to Hate (and Hate to Love) about TV, author Tara Ariano said young female fans were generally unbothered by Bonet's tendency to "deliver her lines either in a monotone or screechy whine" while "looking at Denise with the eyes of love". Erin Faith Wilson of AfterEllen called A Different World one of her favorite shows because of Denise, praising her clothes, intelligence, and perception that "she didn't put up with shit from anyone ... At the time, she seemed to scream feminism and I couldn't get enough". Bustle's Rikki Byrd wrote, "Although it was sad to see her go, the little bit of time she was on offered up enough style inspiration to last a decade". Although most viewers dismissed the show as an unsuccessful spin-off in the immediate wake of Bonet's departure, A Different World proved successful and would go on to air for five more seasons without Bonet. In a retrospective review of Denise's role on A Different World, Jezebel's Clover Hope said "there's nothing that fascinating about Denise", who she described as "an atrocious student". However, Hope admitted that the character is popular due to her wardrobe and relatability.

== Impact and legacy ==
Denise remains the acting role for which Bonet is best-known. In his biography of the actress, Michael Hastings of AllMovie said that after "assert[ing] herself as one of the most memorable kids in the Huxtable clan", Bonet has "enjoy[ed] a longevity that few former child stars can claim". According to Refinery29's Kara Kia, she is just as admired for her own rebelliousness, elusiveness, and sense of style as Denise is. Bob McCann, author of Encyclopedia of African American Actresses in Film and Television, believes an entire generation of African-American teenagers grew up infatuated with Denise. The Root's Erin E. Evans summarized Denise as "the eccentric daughter whom every young Cosby fan either wanted to be like or be with". Denise's personal style was largely embraced by the public, and she is widely considered to be a style icon. The Guardian's Danielle Henderson credits the character with introducing television audiences to boho-chic 30 years before it became a mainstream fashion trend. Evans agreed that Denise was a trendsetter, and Kia named Denise's bohemian aesthetic one of the decade's defining looks. Vibe's Kamille Cooper crowned the character "the epitome of the Bohemian Chic" and described her overall wardrobe as a "pop culture phenomenon", observing that women continue to emulate Denise's style decades after The Cosby Show ended. Dana Oliver of HuffPost said she "can't recall many teen girls who didn't try to copy Denise Huxtable's bohemian flair". In 2014, Bustle compared Denise's impact on fashion to Carrie Bradshaw from Sex and the City and the cast of Gossip Girl, with author Cherise Luter calling her clothes as appropriate for the present as they were for the 1980s. Agreeing that Denise is a precursor to Carrie Bradshaw and Cookie Lyon from Empire, Julee Wilson of HuffPost named her "one of our first TV style crushes", crediting the character with teaching fans how to layer and accessorize. Brit + Co dubbed Denise "the eclectic style queen of college". In her book I Want to Be Her!: How Friends & Strangers Helped Shape My Style, author Andrea Linett described Denise as "The first television character who really had style" and her main reason to watch The Cosby Show.

Several publications have ranked Denise among the best-dressed characters on television, including Elle, Glamour, Essence, StyleCaster, Vibe, and Harper's Bazaar. In 2017, the same magazine declared her one of the 50 most stylish fictional characters of all-time. HuffPost described Denise as the sixth most fashionable teenager across film and television, writing that "Everyone in the world still wants to be Denise". BuzzFeed ranked Denise the most fashionable television character of the 1990s, describing her as "undisputed style icon of the '80s and '90s". Sophia Elias of HelloGiggles said she "may very well go down as one of the most stylish characters in television history". Entertainment Weekly said Denise had third most iconic television hairstyle, and Marie Claire included Denise at number six on their "15 Female TV Characters That Have Incredible Hair" ranking. HelloGiggles featured her among "The Best Beauty Looks From Your Fave '90s Characters", with author Farah Prince dubbing her the "one person from the '90s I wanted to emulate the most" while complimenting praising her sparse use of makeup. Refinery29 crowned Denise one of their "favorite '80s fashion heroes", calling her a constant source of "inspiration (and hairspiration)". Glamour ranked Bonet among the best style icons of the decade, describing her as "he most beautiful and wholesome girl on TV" at the time.

Sherri Williams of The Washington Post described both Denise and Bonet as it-girls "of the 1980s whose unique style and independence endeared audiences", and AfterEllen's Erin Faith Wilson called the character one of her favorite television crushes from the time period. According to Nick Slay of The Source, Denise established herself as a "pop culture icon". Refinery29 and HelloGiggles ranked Denise highly on listicles about desirable television siblings. According to The Washington Post, Denise provided the original blueprint for "How TV handles beloved characters going off to college", which Uproxx's Alan Sepinwall described as "Tak[ing] the most popular/exciting/funny character supporting character "and trust that they can carry a new show on their own". College Magazine ranked Denise the fifth best fictional college student. Denise's "replacement" Pam was not particularly well-received by fans after she was written out of the series. In 2012, clothing company Urban Outfitters created a clothing line inspired by Denise entitled "A Different World", describing it as "a nod to the coolest older sister ever". Business Insider criticized the organization for hiring a white model to promote the clothing line, arguing "that most Urban customers wouldn't even know who Denise is." Denise has served as a blueprint for and inspired a generation of young, middle-class female television characters attending college. According to Soraya Nadia McDonald of The Undefeated, "Girls modeled on Denise are smart, but their intellect isn't necessarily reflected in their grades. They're sheltered, and they move through college under ideal, manageable circumstances. And they're presented as typical, pleasant girls who should be completely relatable for white America".

Some of My Best Friends Are Black: The Strange Story of Integration in America author Tanner Colby reported that applications to historically black colleges and universities in America increased by 14% one year after Denise started attending Hillman, while mostly white colleges experienced their first noticeable decrease in African American enrollment since the civil rights era. In 2018, a spin-off of the sitcom Black-ish premiered. Entitled Grown-ish, the spin-off revolves around one of the show's characters Zoey (Yara Shahidi) leaving home and attending college; the spin-off's college-related storyline and main character have drawn extensive comparisons to Denise, with both series initially "focus[ing] on the college experience of the oldest daughter in a middle-class black family." A. Bottinick of TV Insider identified both characters' pursuit of higher education and African American heritage among their similarities, dubbing them both "the teen style icons of their time and—quite surprisingly, considering their shows take place years apart—have donned quite a few of the same looks." The York Dispatch's Rick Bentley anticipated that Zoey would be successful because she is imbued with "the same kind of sweetness that was written into Bonet's character so many years ago." The Glow Up contributor S. D. Chrismon believes it is unfair to compare Zoey to her predecessor "any more than Black-ish really compares to The Cosby Show", despite both characters' similarities that include fashion and wit.
