= List of A Different World characters =

A Different World is a spin-off from the American television sitcom The Cosby Show with Denise Huxtable, in the first season. It aired on NBC for six seasons, from 1987 to 1993.

== Main characters ==
=== Denise Huxtable ===
Portrayer	Seasons	No. of episodes
Lisa Bonet	Season 1	23

A native of Brooklyn; Denise Huxtable is the daughter of Hillman alumni Dr. Heathcliff Huxtable and Clair Hanks Huxtable, Esq. She enrolled in Hillman and was roommates with Maggie Lauten and Jaleesa Vinson during her sophomore year. Denise was a poor student who often procrastinated and struggled to manage her time and money. She disliked Whitley Gilbert and endured Dwayne Wayne's crush on her. She left Hillman at the end of her sophomore year to travel to Africa. There, she met and married Lt. Martin Kendall of the U.S. Navy and became the stepmother of Olivia Kendall. She only reappears once in season 3 to give Dwayne closure on his crush.

Note: Denise originated as a regular character on The Cosby Show, on which she was featured on a regular basis during seasons 1–3, 6 and 7, and on a recurring basis during seasons 4 and 5. She left "A Different World" after season 1.

=== Whitley Gilbert-Wayne ===
Portrayer	Seasons	No. of episodes
Jasmine Guy	All 6	142

Whitley Marion Gilbert-Wayne is an Art History and French major at Hillman. A native of Richmond (Virginia), she is daughter of Hillman alumni and divorcees Mercer and Marion Gilbert. She began the series with a snobbish, prissy attitude and disliked by many of the characters although following Denise's departure after season 1, the show was retooled to feature her in the lead. As a consequence, Whitley's character was mellowed out and she was paired romantically with Dwayne, with whom she had an on again-off again relationship. Whitley originally went to college to land a husband although she quickly realized she enjoyed art history and stayed at Hillman for a fifth year to take business courses. After graduation, she was engaged to Dwayne and had a part-time job at E.H. Wright Industries as an assistant art buyer and as a dorm director at Hillman. After learning that Dwayne went on a date with another woman, Whitley broke off their engagement although the two reunited when Whitley slept with Dwayne while she was dating Byron Douglas III. She then went on to getting engaged to Byron. Still, she was ready to marry Byron until Dwayne interrupted her wedding and declared his love for her. The two married and spent their honeymoon in Los Angeles, which coincided with the 1992 riots following the verdict in the Rodney King trial. After being laid off at E.H. Wright Industries, Whitley was employed in a series of odd jobs until she became a teacher at a school for troubled adolescents. At the end of the series, Whitley learns she's pregnant and she and Dwayne move to Tokyo, Japan upon a job offer for Dwayne.

=== Dwayne Wayne ===
Portrayer	Seasons	No. of episodes
Kadeem Hardison	All 6	142

Dwayne Wayne is a mathematics major at Hillman. A native of Brooklyn, he achieved a perfect score on the math portion of the SAT. He is best recognized by his flip up sunglasses and is known for making unsuccessful advances on numerous women throughout his freshman year. He had a crush on Denise and unsuccessfully ran for the title of "Miss Hillman" at her urging to highlight the sexism of the pageant. His best friend/roommate is Ron Johnson. Although he dated several women across the series, he was most involved in an on-again-off-again relationship with Whitley Gilbert. After working at a summer internship for Kinishewa Electronics in Japan, he began a relationship with Kinu Owens. However, he broke up with her once he realized he was still in love with Whitley. He graduated from Hillman as valedictorian of Class of 1991 and engaged to Whitley. He became a mathematics professor at Hillman but his engagement with Whitley was broken off when he almost cheated on her. However, during her relationship with Byron Douglas III, the two slept together and he interrupted Whitley and Byron's wedding ceremony to declare his love for her. Whitley left Byron at the altar for Dwayne and the two quickly married. They honeymooned in Los Angeles, which coincided with the 1992 riots following the verdict in the Rodney King trial. At the end of the series, Whitley became pregnant with their first child and he designed a new video game for Kinishewa with Ron. The couple decided to move to Japan for his work.

== Supporting characters ==
Character	Actor	Seasons					
Character	Actor	1	2	3	4	5	6
Maggie Lauten	Marisa Tomei	Main					
Jaleesa Vinson-Taylor	Dawnn Lewis	Main	Main	Main	Main	Main	
Stevie Rallen	Loretta Devine	Main					
Ronald "Ron" Martin Johnson	Darryl M. Bell	Recurring	Main	Main	Main	Main	Main
Coach Walter Oakes	Sinbad	Recurring	Main	Main	Main		
Leticia "Lettie" Bostic	Mary Alice	Main	Main				
Kimberly Reese	Charnele Brown		Main	Main	Main	Main	Main
Winifred "Freddie" Brooks	Cree Summer		Main	Main	Main	Main	Main
Colonel Bradford Taylor	Glynn Turman		Main	Main	Main	Main	Main
Vernon Gaines	Lou Myers		Main	Main	Main	Main	Main
Gina Deveaux	Ajai Sanders				Recurring	Recurring	Main
Lena James	Jada Pinkett					Recurring	Main
Charmaine Tyesha Brown	Karen Malina White						Main

Maggie Lauten (Marisa Tomei): A "military brat" and journalism major, she is one of the few white students at predominantly African American Hillman. She transferred to Hillman at the start of the sophomore year and was roommates with Denise Huxtable and Jaleesa Vinson. Maggie was a sweet-natured, although occasionally ditzy, girl. If Maggie would have stayed on the show after season one, Debbie Allen (the show's producer from seasons 2–6) would have given her a black boyfriend and there would have been an episode where Dwayne brings her home for Thanksgiving dinner and Dwayne's parents disapproves of his interracial relationship. Due to Marisa Tomei leaving the show after the first season, the story never happened.

Jaleesa Vinson-Taylor (Dawnn Lewis): native of Camden (New Jersey), sister of Danielle and Yvonne Vinson, ex-wife of Lamar Collins, enrolled at Hillman at age 26, a business management major, roommate of Denise and Maggie during sophomore year, worked part-time at the Hillman library, assistant dorm director of Gilbert Hall, vacationed in Greece with Maggie during the summer of 1988, roommate of Freddie during junior and senior years, worked a summer installing cable television, entered into serious relationship with Walter, co-dorm director of Gilbert Hall, engaged to Walter, couple halts wedding at the altar and mutually separates, graduated (Class of 1990), accepted an entry-level corporate position, off-campus roommate of Whitley, married Colonel Bradford Taylor (in a surprise elopement), stepmother of Suzanne and Terrence, started a temporary employment agency, gave birth to daughter Imani, disappeared after season five. Comes back to Richmond, Va. with Suzanne, Terrence and Colonel Bradford Taylor and Imani.

Stevie Rallen (Loretta Devine): mother of J.T., graduate student dorm director of Gilbert Hall, replaced by Lettie Bostic

Ronald Marlon Johnson, Jr. (Darryl M. Bell): native of Detroit (Michigan), son of Ron Johnson Sr. and brother of Rachel Johnson, roommate and best friend of Dwayne, involved in serious relationship with Millie, member of the ROTC pledged Kappa Lambda Nu Fraternity and successfully "crossed over", dated numerous women during most of his college career, worked summers as a salesman for his father's automobile dealership, falsely implied that Dwayne's campaign for student body president was endorsed by former presidential candidate Jesse Jackson, member of the Hillman ROTC, managed/performed in the band X-Pression, graduated after nine semesters (January 1992), victim of a bias incident at Virginia A&M University (on the weekend of Martin Luther King, Jr. Day 1992), band breaks up, employed as spokesman for a phone sex hotline, employed as a car salesman (independent of his father), unemployed, criticized Kimberly's interracial relationship with Matthew (but later admitted he was jealous), entered into serious relationship with Kimberly (after pursuing her for months), antagonist of Shazza, cheated on Kimberly with Freddie (while Freddie was involved with Shazza), broke up with Kimberly, entered into serious relationship with Freddie, manager and co-owner of "The Place Where The Blues Will Be Played" with Mr. Gaines, provided the concept which inspired Dwayne's new video game for Kinishewa, chosen to be godfather of Dwayne and Whitley's unborn child.

Walter Oakes (Sinbad): graduate student, football/baseball/basketball/track coach, dorm director of all-male residence hall, involved in serious relationship with Jaleesa, co-dorm director of Gilbert Hall, engaged to Jaleesa, couple halts wedding at the altar and mutually separates, moves to Philadelphia to manage community center.

Leticia "Lettie" Bostic (Mary Alice): enrolled in Hillman, dropped out of Hillman a few credits short of her degree, moved to Paris, met Pablo Picasso, spied for the Allies during World War II, rejected marriage proposal from South African freedom fighter Marcus Mpepo, replaced Stevie as dorm director of Gilbert Hall decades later in 1988, chastises Kimberly for engaging in unprotected sex, disappeared after season two.

Winifred "Freddie" Brooks (Cree Summer): native of New Mexico, daughter of Joni Brooks, cousin of Matthew, roommate of Jaleesa during freshman and sophomore years, has unrequited feelings for Dwayne, was a student activist throughout her undergraduate career, dated Garth Parks (who almost rapes her), dated Ernest Bennett, roommate of Kimberly during junior and senior years, entered into serious relationship with Shazza Zulu, graduated (Class of 1992), enrolled in Hillman Law School, co-dorm director of Height Hall, cheated on Shazza with Ron (while Ron was involved with Kimberly), broke up with Shazza on Thanksgiving Day 1992, entered into serious relationship with Ron, earned law review membership and completed first year of law school.

Kimberly Reese (Charnele Brown): native of Columbus (Ohio), daughter of Clinton Reese, roommate (and best friend) of Whitley during freshman and sophomore years, a biology major, employed by Mr. Gaines at The Pit part-time throughout her undergraduate career, involved in serious relationship with Robert (had a pregnancy "false alarm"), rejected a much-needed scholarship because of the sponsoring corporation's investments in apartheid-controlled South Africa, employed at funeral home part-time, roommate of Freddie during junior and senior years, involved in serious relationship with Matthew, pledged Alpha Delta Rho Sorority and successfully "crossed over", performed in the band X-Pression, graduated (Class of 1992), entered into serious relationship with Ron (after being pursued for months), enrolled in Hillman Medical School, co-dorm director of Height Hall, broke up with Ron, entered into serious relationship with fellow medical student Spencer Boyer, completed first year of medical school, and is engaged to Spencer by the end of the series (after turning down numerous proposals from him).

Colonel Bradford Taylor (Glynn Turman): served in the U.S. Army during the Vietnam War, retired with the rank of colonel, ex-husband of Johanna, father of Suzanne and Terrence, professor of mathematics at Hillman (nicknamed "Dr. War" because of his reputation as a demanding professor), commander of the Hillman ROTC, became Dwayne's primary mentor, was distraught when his former student Zelmer Collier was deployed to the Persian Gulf just before the start of Operation Desert Storm, rejected membership in an all-white country club after being criticized by Terrence, married Jalessa Vinson (in a surprise elopement), brother-in-law of Danielle Vinson, became a father for the third time when Jaleesa gave birth to daughter Imani.

Vernon Gaines (Lou Myers): met Lena Horne during World War II; husband of Velma and father of Darnell; uncle of Faith, Hope, Charity and Henrietta; owner and manager of The Pit; employer of Byron Douglas III; employer and father figure of Kimberly; co-owner of apartment building with Velma; frequent critic of his ne'er-do-well son; temporary employer of Whitley; employer of both Lena and Charmaine; co-owner of "The Place Where The Blues Will Be Played" with Ron; reunited with Lena Horne in 1993.

Gina Deveaux (Ajai Sanders): family emigrated to the U.S. from Martinique, pledged Alpha Delta Rho Sorority and successfully "crossed over", dated Dion (who physically abused her), pressed charges against Dion and broke up with him, roommate of Lena and Charmaine at the start of junior year, involved in incident that led Charmaine to falsely accuse Terrell of sexual harassment, placed on academic probation, moved off-campus into house (with Lena, Charmaine, Terrell and Dorian), rejected Dion again after he violated probation and contacted her, completed junior year and still enrolled at Hillman.

Lena James (Jada Pinkett): native of Baltimore (Maryland), daughter of Grover James, originally an engineering major but later journalism major, named after singer Lena Horne, ended high school relationship with Piccolo, employed by Mr. Gaines at The Pit part-time, developed a brief crush on Dwayne, roommate of Gina and Charmaine at the start of sophomore year, entered into serious (yet celibate) relationship with Dorian, rejected Piccolo's attempt to reconcile, moved off-campus into house (with Gina, Charmaine, Terrell and Dorian), completed sophomore year and still enrolled at Hillman.

Charmaine Brown (Karen Malina White): native of Brooklyn (New York), best friend of Claire Huxtable's distant cousin Pam Tucker, began dating Lance Rodman in high school, visited Hillman with Lance during her senior year of high school, roommate of Gina and Lena at the start of her freshman year at Hillman, amazed and annoyed others with her rapid pattern of speech, employed by Mr. Gaines at The Pit part-time, mistakenly accused Terrell of sexual harassment, relationship with Lance ended when he broke up with her by telephone, failed French midterm after she and Terrell were caught cheating, harassed by local residents (along with Terrell), moved off-campus into house (with Gina, Lena, Terrell and Dorian), completed freshman year and still enrolled at Hillman. [Note: Charmaine originated as a recurring character on The Cosby Show. She was featured during seasons 7 and 8 of that series.]

== Recurring characters ==
- Millicent ("Millie") (Marie-Alise Recasner): Whitley's confidante and only friend for much of season one, involved in serious relationship with Ron, disappeared after season one (last name unrevealed).
- Barnabus Foster (Roscoe Lee Browne): Hillman alumnus and friend of Cliff and Clair Huxtable, professor of English at Hillman (originated as a recurring character on The Cosby Show).
- Clair Huxtable (Phylicia Rashād): active Hillman alumna, wife of Cliff, daughter-in-law of Russell, mother of Denise, partner in New York law firm, mother-in-law of Martin Kendall (originated as a leading character on The Cosby Show).
- Dean Hughes (Rosalind Cash): Hillman dean of students during seasons two through four (character originated on The Cosby Show)
- Marion Height Gilbert (Diahann Carroll): wealthy socialite and Hillman alumna, crowned Miss Hillman as an undergraduate, mother of Whitley, ex-wife of Mercer, aunt of Liza and Courtney, antagonist of Adele Wayne, mother-in-law of Dwayne. She also sits on the Hillman College's board of trustees.
- Julian Day (Dominic Hoffman): exchange student from Georgetown University, entered into serious relationship with Whitley, broke up with Whitley, engaged to marry another woman (Shelby), plans to move to Paris.
- Adele Wayne (Patti LaBelle): homemaker, wife of Woodson, mother of Dwayne, antagonist of Marion Gilbert, and mother-in-law of Whitley.
- Ernest Bennett (Rueben Grundy): briefly dated Freddie Brooks.
- Molefi (Ron Mokwena): international student from apartheid-controlled South Africa, disappeared after season four.
- Velma Gaines (Bebe Drake, Ann Weldon): homemaker; wife of Vernon and mother of Darnell; aunt by marriage of Faith, Hope, Charity and Henrietta; co-owner of apartment building with Vernon; frequent apologist for her ne'er-do-well son.
- Terrence Taylor (Cory Tyler): "military brat", son of Bradford and Johanna Taylor, brother of Suzanne, Taylor criticized his father's decision to join an all-white country club, converted to Islam, unsuccessfully attempted to romance Freddie, decided to major in dance (to the initial dismay of his father), pledged Kappa Lambda Nu Fraternity and successfully "crossed over". stepson of Jaleesa, half-brother of Bradford and Jaleesa's baby daughter Imani. Appeared in seasons 4 and 5.
- Kinu Owens (Alisa Gyse Dickens): student at Avery College, worked as summer intern with Kinishewa, entered into serious relationship with Dwayne, broke up with Dwayne because of his lingering feelings for Whitley, graduated, married to another man, employed as an executive with Kinishewa in Tokyo.
- Matthew (Andrew Lowery): cousin of Freddie, visiting student from Avery College, briefly involved in serious relationship with Kimberly.
- Shazza Zulu (Gary Dourdan): born Sylvester Simon, matriculated at Hillman for at least six years, changed his name to Shazza Zulu, converted a failing term paper into a book criticizing other African-American men, publicly criticized Kimberly's interracial relationship with Matthew, heavily involved in community activism, entered into serious relationship with Freddie, antagonist of Ron, broke up with Freddie on Thanksgiving Day 1992 (after she cheated on him with Ron), unsuccessfully attempted to renew his relationship with Freddie just prior to Christmas 1992.
- Byron Douglas III (Joe Morton): son of Byron Douglas II and Imogene Douglas, brother of Troy, enrolled at Hillman, employed by Mr. Gaines at The Pit part-time, graduated, owner of restaurant chain years later, announced candidacy for the Virginia state senate, entered into serious relationship with Whitley, forgives Whitley after she cheats on him with Dwayne, elected to the Virginia state senate, engaged to Whitley, rejected during the wedding ceremony by Whitley (who married Dwayne immediately thereafter).
- Terrell Walker (Patrick Y. Malone): native of Brooklyn (New York), achieved a combined score of 1500 (out of 1600) on the SAT, roommate of Dorian at the start of freshman year, falsely accused of sexual harassment by Charmaine, failed French midterm after he and Charmaine were caught cheating, harassed by local residents (along with Charmaine), almost expelled for carrying a gun on campus, moved off-campus into house (with Gina, Lena, Charmaine, and Dorian), completed freshman year and still enrolled at Hillman
- Dorian Heywood (Bumper Robinson): born-again Christian, star player on the Hillman basketball team, roommate of Terrell at the start of freshman year, entered into serious (yet celibate) relationship with Lena, uncharacteristically entered into physical altercation with Piccolo over Lena, moved off-campus into house (with Gina, Lena, Charmaine, and Terrell), completed freshman year and still enrolled at Hillman
- Spencer Boyer (Michael Ralph): emigrated to the U.S. from Jamaica, enrolled at Hillman Medical School, entered into serious relationship with Kimberly, completed first year of medical school, engaged to Kimberly (after numerous proposals from him were turned down).
- Dorothy Dandridge Davenport (Jenifer Lewis): Hillman dean of students during season six. Known for placing unruly students "on her list!"
