= Tibideaux =

Tibideaux may refer to:

- Elvin Tibideaux, a fictional character in The Cosby Show
- Carmen Tibideaux, a fictional character in Glee
