= Rudy Huxtable =

Fictional character from The Cosby Show

- The Cosby Show character
- Actress Keshia Knight Pulliam in character as Rudy Huxtable.
- First appearance: "Pilot" (September 20, 1984)
- Last appearance: "And So We Commence" (April 30, 1992)
- Created by: Bill Cosby
- Portrayed by: Keshia Knight Pulliam

In-universe information
- Full name: Rudith Lillian Huxtable
- Occupation: Student
- Family: Cliff Huxtable (father); Clair Huxtable (mother); Sondra Huxtable (sister); Denise Huxtable (sister); Theo Huxtable (brother); Vanessa Huxtable (sister)
- Relatives: Russel Huxtable (paternal grandfather); Anna Huxtable (paternal grandmother); Al Hanks (maternal grandfather); Carrie Hanks (maternal grandmother); Pam Tucker (cousin); Olivia Kendall (step-niece); Nelson Tibideaux (nephew); Winnie Tidideaux (niece)
- Nationality: American

Rudith Lillian "Rudy" Huxtable is a fictional character who appears on the American sitcom The Cosby Show (1984–1992). Portrayed by actress Keshia Knight Pulliam, Rudy is the youngest child of Cliff and Clair Huxtable. First appearing alongside her family in the pilot episode "Theo's Economic Lesson", which premiered on September 20, 1984, Rudy matures from a precocious five-year-old girl into a teenager longing for independence throughout the course of the series' eight year-long run.

Created by comedian Bill Cosby, Rudy was intended to be a boy; actor Jaleel White had been considered the first choice for the role until Knight Pulliam impressed the show's producers once auditions had finally been opened to girls. Having been opposed to the idea of featuring young children, particularly young girls, on his show because he feared that they would prove difficult to work with, Cosby was hesitant to cast Knight Pulliam due to her young age at the time. However, he was ultimately impressed by both her maturity and ability to memorize lines, subsequently re-writing the character into a younger, female role but refused to change her name from the more masculine-sounding "Rudy". By the second season, Cosby began entrusting Knight Pulliam with more mature material. Rudy was inspired by Cosby's youngest daughter Evin.

Both the character and Knight Pulliam's performance immediately garnered widespread acclaim from entertainment critics. Knight Pulliam was nominated for an Emmy Award for Outstanding Supporting Actress in a Comedy Series in 1986, becoming the youngest performer to be nominated for an Emmy Award; the scene in which she lip-syncs to Ray Charles' "Night Time is the Right Time" has garnered significant attention. Her role as Rudy eventually established her as a child star. However, critics have observed that Knight Pulliam's once-reliable "cuteness" began to falter and grow less funny towards the show's latter seasons as both the actress and her character aged.

== Role ==
Rudy (Keshia Knight Pulliam) is introduced as the five-year-old youngest child of Cliff (Bill Cosby), an obstetrician, and Clair Huxtable (Phylicia Rashad), a lawyer; the character's full name is revealed to be "Rudith Lillian Huxtable" in the first-season episode "Theo and the Joint". She is the youngest sister of Sondra (Sabrina Le Beuf), Denise (Lisa Bonet), Theo (Malcolm-Jamal Warner) and Vanessa (Tempestt Bledsoe). In early episodes, Rudy attends an unidentified grammar school and owns a teddy bear she calls "Bobo" and a pet goldfish named Lamont. Rudy also proves to be a gifted football player, becoming known for her speed and endurance as a member of the Pee-Wee League football team.

Several episodes revolve around the Huxtable family entertaining Rudy and her young friends, such as sleepovers and dinners. Her childhood best friend is Peter Chiara (Peter Costa), a quiet and shy boy who lives in a house across the street from the Huxtables. Rudy eventually befriends Kenny (Deon Richmond), also known as "Bud", who often expresses a romantic interest in her and sometimes competes for her affection against Rudy's other love interests; the two characters also frequently debate each other about gender roles.

Several Rudy-centric storylines explore the character's struggles of being the youngest member of her large family. Over the course of the series, Rudy matures from a young child into a teenager, to the point of which she starts dating. Cliff sometimes fears that his youngest daughter is growing up too fast, struggling with the realization that soon she will cease to be "his little girl". Rudy's hunger for independence and maturity sometimes gets her into trouble, such as when she attends an underage club against her parents' wishes and is ultimately punished for her defiance. By the end of the series, a 13 year-old Rudy is the only Huxtable child still living in her parents' home full-time in the absence of her four older siblings, all of whom have successfully moved out having either gotten married or pursued higher education.

== Development ==
=== Creation and casting ===
Comedian Bill Cosby began developing The Cosby Show partially because he was not impressed with popular family sitcoms airing at the time, several of which he felt were too reliant on children disrespecting and disobeying their parents without suffering serious consequences. Cosby was opposed to the idea of his show featuring children altogether, preferring to create and star in a series about a married, childless couple instead. When executive producers Marcy Carsey and Tom Werner convinced Cosby to develop a sitcom about a nuclear family, the comedian decided his show would feature a family of children who were obviously intelligent, "but their parents were always smarter and—most importantly—in charge." Written as a male character, Rudy was initially conceived as the youngest of only four children, two girls and two boys. Cosby envisioned the youngest Huxtable child as a young boy who idolizes his older brother Theo, giving him the typically masculine name "Rudy" and intending to base the character on his own sons.

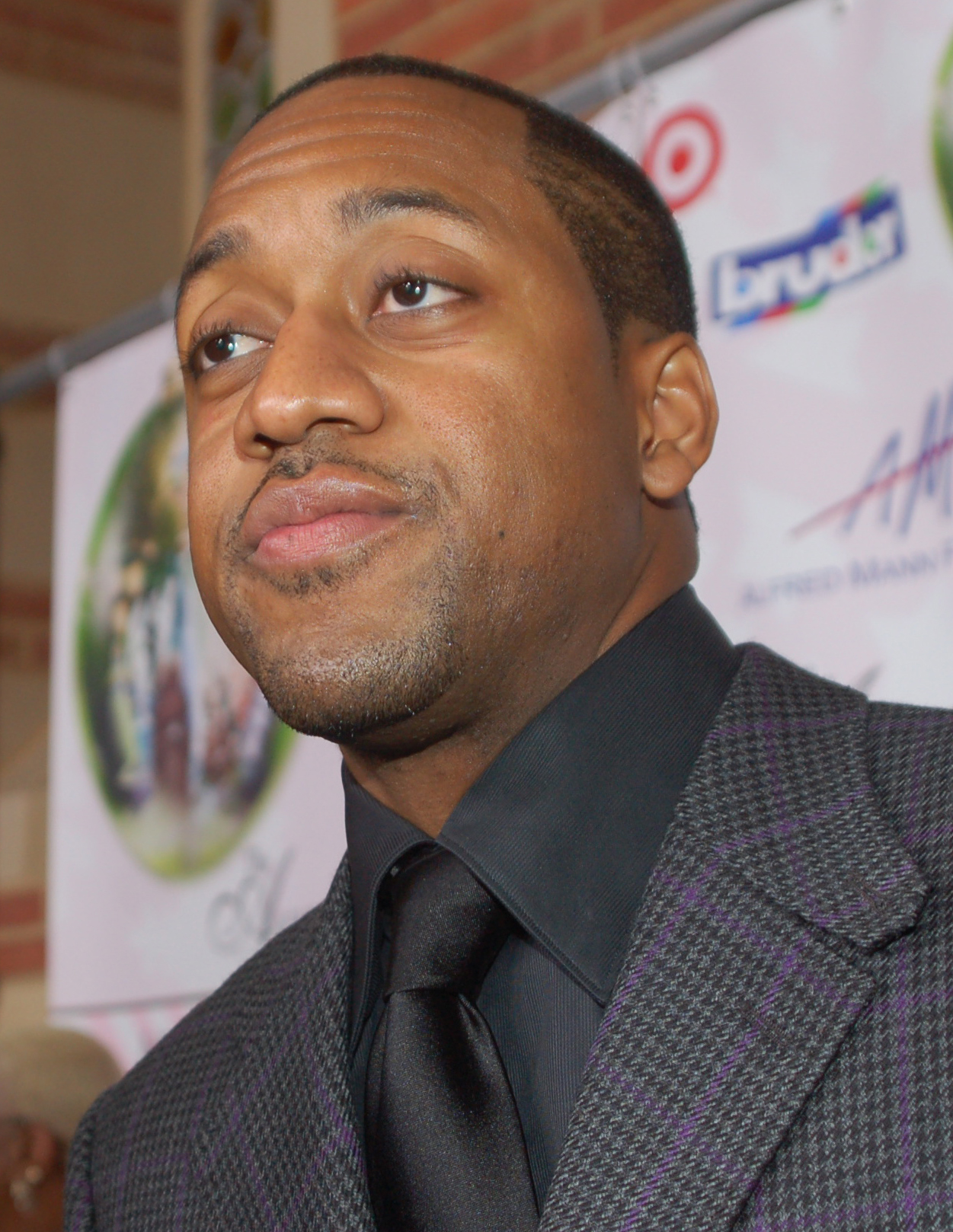
Actor Jaleel White was considered the frontrunner for the role of Rudy until Knight Pulliam auditioned.

When casting his television children, Cosby insisted that none of the candidates be younger than 10 years-old due to challenges he had experienced working alongside child actors prior. He warned the producers "We'll be shooting for the rest of our lives if we have a little kid!" However, Carsey and Werner believed that Cosby had proven too gifted at working with children to avoid featuring them on the show altogether, and eventually convinced the comedian to audition a few six-year-old actors for the then-male role of Rudy. After first auditioning in 1984, actor Jaleel White was at one point considered to be the top contender for the role, so much so that his agent advised his family to start preparing to relocate to New York, where The Cosby Show was scheduled to begin filming; White's family had already begun packing and researching apartments within the area. However, the producers still wanted to audition a few more children for the role at the last minute, one of whom was four-year-old actress Keshia Knight Pulliam, who Werner had discovered in a then-recent television commercial for Del Monte canned corn. Knight Pulliam's professional acting experience at the time had included advertising baby products for Johnson & Johnson and appearing in several television commercials. She had already made her television debut as a series regular on the children's television show Sesame Street, on which she had appeared for two seasons.

Although Cosby eventually became open to the idea of young children appearing on his show, he still insisted that they not cast "little girls" because he had typically acted opposite child actresses while filming several commercials for Jell-O and feared repeating himself or appearing redundant. Casting a boy in the role eventually proved difficult so the auditions were slowly opened up to girls, prompting one of the casting directors to sneak Pulliam into one of the auditions without Cosby's prior knowledge. During one of her first screen tests, director Jay Sandrich recalled that Knight Pulliam struggled to maintain eye contact with him and appeared to be constantly distracted by one of the television monitors. When Sandrich questioned her behavior, the actress gestured towards the screen and said "That’s me! How can you make me on the TV?" Knight Pulliam's curiosity greatly impressed Sandrich to the point of which he immediately short-listed the actress, replacing White as top choice.

White recalled being present to witness Knight Pulliam's last-minute audition, which the network had previously assured him was merely "a formality"; Warner and Bledsoe were also in attendance to audition for the roles of Theo and Vanessa, respectively, as well as NBC president Brandon Tartikoff and Cosby himself. Over the course of six hours, the producers asked each finalist to make them laugh. When the producers hand-picked the finalists, White was one of several actors who returned home upon not being selected. According to Sandrich, Cosby agreed with his decision regarding Knight Pulliam's casting, explaining, "once Bill saw her, there was just no way she couldn't be on the show". Although Cosby was initially hesitant to add such a young actor to the cast, he admitted to being impressed by Knight Pulliam's intelligence and ability to follow instructions, despite her young age. Cosby refused to change the character's name, insisting that the name "Rudy" was equally as suitable for a girl as it is for a boy. White would eventually become best known for portraying Urkel on the sitcom Family Matters. Despite dubbing this experience his "tragic auditioning story", he explained "I’m grateful that things worked out the way they did; I think it put a little more money in my pocket."

=== Portrayal ===
In addition to changing the character from male to female by impressing the producers, Knight Pulliam's casting as Rudy also affected Theo's role, who ultimately became the only son among four sisters, resulting in the Huxtables mirroring Cosby's own family. Rudy is believed to have been based on Cosby's daughter Evin. The Huxtable household eventually grew once eldest sister Sondra was introduced in later episodes on, making Rudy the youngest of five children instead. During the first few seasons, Knight Pulliam had to learn and memorize her lines phonetically because she had not yet learned how to read. Her parents James and Denise often helped the actress memorize her material. Additionally, she was privately tutored on the set of The Cosby Show. Both Knight Pulliam and her character were considered to be personal favorites of Cosby. Calling him "real funny", Knight Pulliam particularly enjoyed when Cosby would venture away from the script in order to make his cast mates laugh. Cosby would patiently advise Knight Pulliam on her acting and reward her with high fives when he was impressed by her performance. On other occasions, he would playfully "steal" some of her dialogue. Describing the young actress as "unbelievable", Cosby recalled that "People gravitated to her ... We never had a problem. Nobody ever had to come down from wherever they were observing and get the child and stop her from crying." Knight Pulliam and Cosby's relationship extended off screen; the actress recalled that she and the comedian "had a competition going on to see who would do a better job at lip-syncing ... That was our little inside thing. I think I did a better job." Knight Pulliam believes "There was no better foundation than to work with the talented cast with Mr. Cosby leading the way."

Marilyn Marshall of Ebony observed that Knight Pulliam shares her character's friendliness, well-manners and tomboyish demeanor. By the second season, Rudy's role was expanded beyond that of solely "the baby of the family", and Cosby began giving the actress more mature material because she had "earned the reputation ... for rarely flubbing her lines." Most of The Cosby Show's storylines tend to revolve around the three youngest children, Theo, Vanessa and Rudy. Knight Pulliam would also do her homework either on set or in her dressing room in between tapings. Knight Pulliam eventually matured to the point of which she outgrew the cuteness that was synonymous with the role, so Cosby developed a storyline that introduced Olivia Kendall (Raven-Symoné), Denise's three-year-old step-daughter via her marriage to Martin Kendall. The Root contributor Erin E. Evans agreed that "With Rudy in her early teens, Olivia provided all the 'aww-ain't-she-cute' moments in the series' final seasons."The A. V. Club observed that the older Rudy got the more she adopted "the storylines previously reserved for" older sister Vanessa. In 1986, Knight Pulliam identified The Cosby Show as her favorite television show. However, the actress voiced that she dislikes being referred to as "Rudy" when she is not in character. The actress fondly remembers her first seasons on the show as her "favorite time". Knight Pulliam is particularly fond of the second season episode "Happy Anniversary", in which the Huxtables perform Ray Charles' "Night Time is the Right Time" (1958) for Cliff's parents in honor of their wedding anniversary. Having portrayed the character for eight years, Knight Pulliam was age 13 by the time the show concluded in 1991. Sandrich likened watching the actress grow to "graduating from college".

=== Characterization ===
As the youngest Huxtable child, Rudy was widely known as the "baby" of the family, a role that eventually expanded as the character grew older. AllMovie's Nathan Southern described the character as "spunky" and "pint-sized". The words "precocious" and "adorable" are often used to describe the character during her earliest appearances. Amber Ferguson, writing for the Erie Times-News, described Rudy as a "wide-eyed, innocent, a little sassy" character who "got the most attention from her parents". Turner Classic Movies referred to Rudy as "outspoken" and "equal parts sugar and sass." Ebony agreed that the character is "known for her smile and sass". Rudy could be obstinate and difficult at times, such as when she refuses to learn to play the violin for her school music class because she would much rather play the cymbals, which had been assigned to her friend Kim (Naoka Nakagowa). Rudy also has a tendency to act in a bossy manner towards some of her friends, particularly Peter and Kenny. A running joke throughout the series is Rudy's decision to nickname Kenny "Bud" simply because she wants to. HuffPost's Jennifer Armstrong believes Rudy's decision to rename Kenny reminds audiences that "She is in charge." Knight Pulliam believes that Rudy had "mellowed out some" by the end of the series.

Rudy's pigtails are considered to be her signature characteristic; Biography.com's Eudie Pak described the character as a "pigtailed whippersnapper." The character also exhibits traits of being a budding young feminist, specifically in her interactions with Kenny; Rudy and Kenny often disagree over Kenny's sexist, chauvinistic opinions about women's issues, based on misguided advice he learns from his unseen elder brother.

== Reception ==
=== Critical response ===
Encyclopedia of African American Actresses in Film and Television author Bob McCann hailed Rudy as "the cutest, most personable kid on TV". When the show premiered in 1984, critics immediately raved about Knight Pulliam's acting and maturity. The actress often drew loud laughter and applause from the show's studio audience. HuffPost contributor Julee Wilson said Knight Pulliam "stole our hearts the second she hit the screen", while calling Rudy "our pretend best friend with the best one-liners ... dance moves/karaoke skills ... and sensational style". The New York Daily News touted Rudy "the meddling little sister everyone came to know and love". Writing for the same publication, Kirthana Ramisetti believes "The whole country was enthralled with" Rudy. Turner Classic Movies believes Knight Pulliam's wit was rivaled only by Cosby's, commending her for "h[olding] her own against ... her more experienced cast members". SheKnows dubbed Rudy the "cutest Huxtable". Featured in most of the show's storylines, Rudy is arguably among the more popular of the sitcom's five main children. Rudy's popularity among younger viewers resulted in young fans nicknaming the sitcom "The Rudy Show" due to their fondness of her. Younger viewers typically identified with Rudy's struggles and dilemmas pertaining to her status as the youngest sibling in her family. The Daily Edge compiled a list of "7 reasons Rudy Huxtable was the best TV kid ever", citing her attitude, sense of empowerment and talent among several factors.

In his book The Greatest Sitcoms of All Time, author Martin Gitlin identified the episode "Goodbye Mr. Fish" in which the Huxtables hold a funeral for Rudy's late pet goldfish as a particularly memorable episode, praising Rudy's character development. David Hinckley of the New York Daily News found Rudy to be "impossibly cute" during the episode. Pulliam lip-syncing to a portion of musician Ray Charles' "Night Time is the Right Time" is regarded as one of her most memorable contributions to the series, as well as one of the sitcom's best scenes. Vulture.com's Adam K. Raymond wrote that "Rudy absolutely steals the show with her screams of 'baybay!'". CNN's Lisa Respers France agreed that Pulliam "stole our hearts ", a sentiment echoed by Smokey Fontaine of News One (Pakistani TV channel). The New York Times journalist Wesley Morris observed that audiences mostly remember Rudy for mimicking back up singer Margie Hendrix. Morris elaborated, "All the comedy comes from the incongruity of a snaggletoothed kindergartner mimicking, with all her might, a grown woman’s yearning. She didn’t fill Hendrix’s shoes ... but her trying to suffices as a definition of joy." Morris concluded that the scene established Rudy as the sitcom's "secret ingredient", while Joshua Alston of The A. V. Club declared that the episode "made a star out of Keshia Knight Pulliam". In 2006, IGN's Todd Gilchrist wrote that Rudy's lip syncing remains "the funniest thing on TV". Calling her a character who "offered more wisdom in her youth than any us ever realized", VH1 dubbed Rudy "the ultimate feminist icon", with contributor Elizabeth Black writing, "she knew what she was talking about when it came to life and love, and we could all take a lesson from her these days." Black joked that the female cast of Love & Hip Hop should find Rudy's advice particularly beneficial.

Not all opinions towards the character have been positive, however; Southern observed that Rudy's cuteness gradually waned "as the program wore on and the actress herself aged", believing that her aging inspired the producers to recruit actress Raven-Symoné. Believing that introducing Raven-Symoné's Olivia as the sitcom's "New Kid" served as an improvement over Rudy, Jonah Krakow of IGN wrote "Sorry Rudy, once you hit puberty, the darndest things you said weren't as funny." In an article recognizing "22 characters who stop good TV shows in their tracks", The A. V. Club ranked Rudy third, writing that although "some of the show’s funniest [early] episodes" revolve around Cliff entertaining Rudy, the character eventually "became less natural and more steely as she aged into the storylines previously reserved for shrill pre-teen Vanessa." Agreeing that the character's "cutesy" storylines were then bestowed upon Olivia, the website dismissed Rudy as "an embittered afterthought be-souring any episode in which she appeared." However, the author acknowledged that Knight Pulliam remained "a charming, unforced child actress". Despite remembering Rudy as "Probably my favorite character when I watched this show at age eight", The Atlantic's Joe Reid reminisced that Rudy "can't seem to get past what a waste of a character she became after season four or so." However, Kevin O'Keefe, writing for the same publication, defended the character, highlighting her "pretty-worthwhile story about feeling replaced as the baby of the family by Olivia".

=== Awards and accolades ===
In 1986, Knight Pulliam was nominated for a Primetime Emmy Award for Outstanding Supporting Actress in a Comedy Series, becoming the youngest actor to receive a nomination in the history of the awards ceremony, at the age of six. Although Cosby was somewhat disappointed that not all of his co-stars received Emmy Award recognition that year, he was overjoyed by Knight Pulliam's accomplishment. Ramisetti believes Knight Pulliam was nominated "simply for being adorable". The actress then won a People's Choice Award for Favorite Young TV Performer in 1988, followed by a Kids' Choice Award in 1991. Knight Pulliam's other accolades include several NAACP Image Awards.

== Legacy ==
Rudy ultimately became Pulliam's breakout role, establishing Knight Pulliam as a popular child star. Meanwhile, Knight Pulliam established herself as one of the show's most popular cast members. The actress ultimately became so popular that she was prohibited from riding the school bus to school despite her parents' efforts to provide her with a typical childhood, despite her fame. In his biography of the actress, Nathan Southern of AllMovie wrote that the role "rocketed [Pulliam] into the national spotlight -- and won the hearts of many a devoted '80s television viewer". Knight Pulliam's success as Rudy exposed her to several other acting opportunities throughout the 1980s and 1990s. According to Donald Bogle, author of Primetime Blues: African Americans on Network Television, Knight Pulliam eventually became "the only Black child star of the late 1980s who appeared in movies clearly developed around her." After The Cosby Show, Knight Pulliam would go on to guest star as a guitarist in a 1997 episode of Cosby's self-titled follow-up sitcom Cosby in which both Cosby and Rashad star, reuniting her with her television parents.

Over two decades after The Cosby Show ended, Rudy remains the role for which Pulliam is best-known. Knight Pullman admitted that she has sometimes struggled to separate herself from Rudy when pursuing more mature acting roles, explaining, "people are used to seeing me as a little girl, as Rudy from The Cosby Show at 10 years old. I have to let [audiences] know that now I'm a woman". However, Knight Pulliam has been commended for "avoid[ing] the traps of drugs and crime that had befallen so many other child stars during her career", including Cosby himself who attributes her successful transition from child to adult actress to her strong upbringing, explaining, "you will normally find that the child will behave according to the rules of the family ... It was a pleasure working with her because of the mother and father." Knight Pulliam's visit to Spelman College at nine-years-old, where an episode of The Cosby Show was filmed, inspired the actress to attend the school after the sitcom concluded, from where she ultimately earned a bachelor's degree in sociology. In 2014, VH1 ranked Pulliam 27th on their list of "100 Greatest Kid Stars Of All Time".
