= List of The Cosby Show characters =

The Cosby Show is an American television sitcom starring former actor/comedian Bill Cosby, which aired for eight seasons on NBC from 1984 until 1992, but lasted for eight years. The show focuses on the Huxtable family, an upper middle-class African-American family living in Brooklyn, New York.

== Main characters ==
- Bill Cosby as Cliff Huxtable
- Phylicia Rashad as Clair Huxtable
- Sabrina LeBeauf as Sondra Huxtable-Tibideaux (seasons 2–8; recurring season 1)
- Lisa Bonet as Denise Huxtable (seasons 1–3 and 6–7; recurring seasons 4–5)
- Malcolm-Jamal Warner as Theodore "Theo" Huxtable
- Tempestt Bledsoe as Vanessa Huxtable
- Keshia Knight Pulliam as Rudy Huxtable
- Geoffrey Owens as Elvin Tibideaux (seasons 4–8; recurring seasons 2–3)
- Joseph C. Phillips as Martin Kendall (seasons 6–7; guest season 8)
- Raven-Symoné as Olivia Kendall (seasons 6–8)
- Erika Alexander as Pam Tucker (seasons 7–8)

== Recurring, minor, and one-time characters ==
- Earle Hyman as Russell Huxtable
- Clarice Taylor as Anna Huxtable
- Deon Richmond as Kenny aka "Bud"
- Christopher and Clayton Griggs; Darrian and Donovan Bryant; and Gary LeRoi Gray as Nelson Tibideaux
- Domonique and Monique Reynolds; Jalese & Jenelle Grays; and Jessica Ann Vaughn as Winnie Tibideaux
- Peter Costa as Peter Chiara
- Karen Malina White as Charmaine Brown
- Carl Payne as Walter "Cockroach" Bradley
- Troy Winbush as Denny
- Allen Payne as Lance Rodman
- Pam Potillo as Janet Meiser
- Reno Wilson as Howard
- Elizabeth Narvaez as Kara
- Michelle Thomas as Justine Phillips
- Lisa Rieffel as Susan (Vanessa's friend)
- Rachel Hillman as Susan (Rudy's friend)
- Nicole Rochelle as Danielle
- Naoka Nakagawa as Kim Ogawa
- Merlin Santana as Stanley
- Joe Williams as Al Hanks
- Ethel Ayler as Carrie Hanks
- Alex Ruiz as Lou Hernandez
- Dondre T. Whitfield as Robert Foreman
- William Thomas Jr. as Dabnis Brickey
- Wallace Shawn as Jeffrey Engels
- Adam Sandler as Smitty
- Mushond Lee as Arthur "Slide" Bartell
- Elaine Stritch as Mrs. McGee
- Seth Gilliam as Aaron Dexter
- Gabrielle Carmouche as Deirdre Arpelle
- Vanessa Estelle Williams as Jade Marsh and Cheryl
- Moses Gunn as Joe Kendall
- Nancy Wilson as Lorraine Kendall
