= Sondra Huxtable =

Fictional character in The Cosby Show

- The Cosby Show character
- First appearance: "Bonjour, Sondra" (1984)
- Last appearance: "And So We Commence" (1992)
- Created by: Bill Cosby
- Portrayed by: Sabrina Le Beauf

In-universe information
- Gender: Female
- Occupation: Housewife/Lawyer
- Family: Cliff Huxtable (father); Clair Huxtable (mother); Denise Huxtable-Kendall (sister); Theo Huxtable (brother); Vanessa Huxtable (sister); Rudy Huxtable (sister)
- Spouse: Elvin Tibideaux
- Children: Nelson Tibideaux (son); Winnie Tibideaux (daughter)
- Relatives: Russel Huxtable (paternal grandfather); Anna Huxtable (paternal grandmother); Al Hanks (maternal grandfather); Carrie Hanks (maternal grandmother); Pam Tucker (cousin); Olivia Kendall (step-niece)
- Nationality: American

Sondra Huxtable Tibideaux is a fictional character from the 1980s television series, The Cosby Show.

== Background and production ==
Sondra Huxtable did not appear in the pilot episode of the show. Sondra was created when Bill Cosby wanted the show to express the accomplishment of successfully raising a child (e.g. a college graduate). Sabrina LeBeauf almost missed out on the role because she is only 10 years younger (b. 1958) than Phylicia Rashad (b. 1948), who played her mother in the series. Whitney Houston was in the running to be Sondra Huxtable.

Sondra is introduced partway through Season 1 as the eldest of Cliff and Clair's five children, a sophomore studying pre-law at Princeton University. During Season 2, she meets and begins to date Elvin Tibideaux (Geoffrey Owens), a pre-med student and fellow Princeton sophomore. Elvin irritates Cliff and Clair at first, but they eventually warm up to him and give their blessing to the couple's engagement near the end of Season 3. By the start of Season 4, Sondra and Elvin are married and have completed their undergraduate studies, but shock Cliff and Clair with their plans to open a wilderness supply store rather than continue on to law and medical school. Sondra gives birth to twins in Season 5, a boy and girl that she and Elvin name Nelson and Winnie. Elvin announces that he will attend medical school while Sondra raises the babies, then trade places with her so she can attend law school.

== Reception ==
The character has been criticized for being too light skinned and not resembling the other characters.
