= Cliff Huxtable =

Fictional character from The Cosby Show

- The Cosby Show character
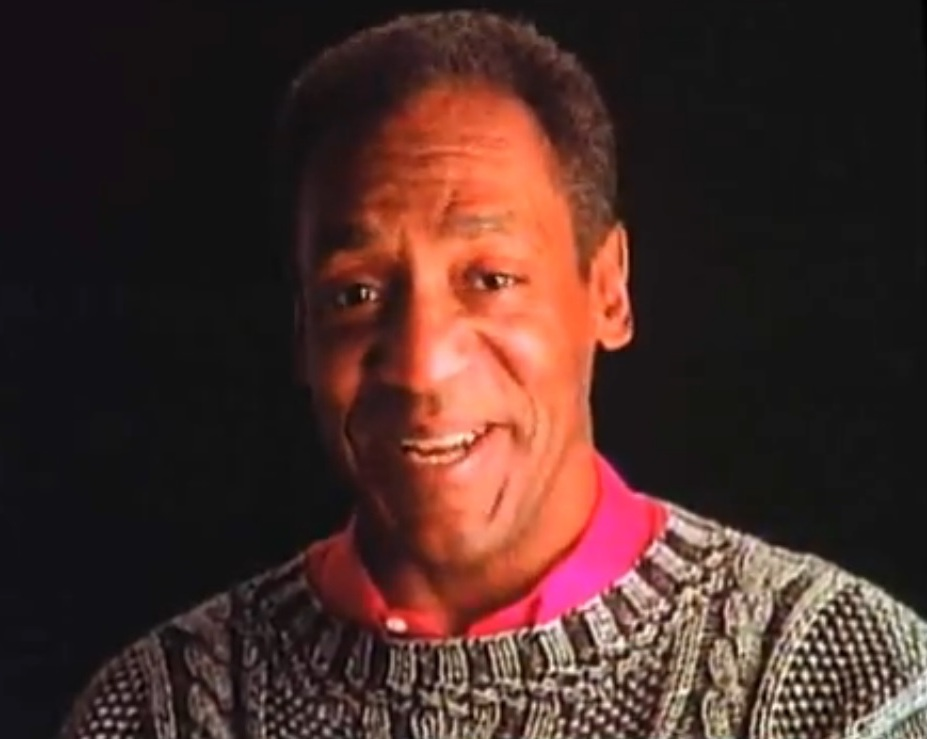
- Bill Cosby in a public service announcement in 1990. His character Cliff Huxtable frequently wore similar sweaters to the one Cosby is wearing in this photo
- First appearance: "Pilot"
- Last appearance: "And So We Commence"
- Created by: Bill Cosby
- Portrayed by: Bill Cosby

In-universe information
- Full name: Heathcliff Isaac Huxtable
- Gender: Male
- Title: Dr.
- Occupation: Physician, Obstetrician
- Family: Russell Huxtable (father); Anna Huxtable (mother); James Theodore Huxtable (brother; deceased); Harriet McCutcheon (paternal great-aunt)
- Spouse: Clair Huxtable
- Children: Sondra Huxtable; Denise Huxtable; Theodore Huxtable; Vanessa Huxtable; Rudy Huxtable
- Nationality: American

Dr. Heathcliff Isaac Huxtable (Note: In the first episode, Cliff's first name was Clifford, but later was changed to Heathcliff. However, in one episode, the show tries to resolve the discrepancy by having Clair call him "Heathclifford" as his full first name.) is a fictional character and the protagonist of the NBC sitcom The Cosby Show, which aired from 1984 to 1992. He was portrayed by actor and comedian Bill Cosby and appeared in all 201 episodes of the show.

Cliff is the Huxtable family patriarch, portrayed as lighthearted and humorous in his interactions with those close to him. Although he is depicted as a devoted father and husband, a recurring joke in the series involves his unsuccessful efforts to encourage his adult children to move out of the family home.

The character had a mostly positive reception from critics and was named as the "Greatest Television Dad". Cosby's portrayal of Cliff Huxtable caused him to gain a reputation as "America's Dad". He was frequently shown wearing colorful sweaters.

== Conception and development ==
Cosby proposed that the couple should both have blue-collar jobs, with the father a limousine driver who owned his own car and the mother an electrician, but with advice from his wife, Camille Cosby, the concept was changed so that the family was well-off financially, with the mother a lawyer and the father a doctor.

== Role ==
Dr. Heathcliff "Cliff" Huxtable is known for his comical antics, playful admonishments, and relentless teasing humor. He lives in Brooklyn Heights, New York. He was born in October 1937 in Philadelphia, making him 47 years old at the beginning of the series. Cliff had a brother, James Theodore Huxtable, who was one year younger and who died of rheumatic fever at the age of seven. In his high school and college years, he was an athlete who wrestled, played football, and ran track. He later served in the U.S. Navy before going to medical school. He is an OB/GYN who runs a practice from an office annexed to the family home; in addition, he is frequently on call to deliver babies at a local hospital. In the show, most characters outside of family and friends refer to him as "Dr. Huxtable", and he is well-respected in the community.

Cliff is married to Clair Huxtable. Both Cliff and Clair attended the fictional historically black college Hillman College. Together they have five children: Sondra, Denise, Theodore (Theo), Vanessa, and Rudith (Rudy). Cliff enjoys live jazz, has an extensive collection of albums, and tries to eat junk food whenever he can get away with it. He attended Meharry Medical College in Nashville, Tennessee.

Cliff is very eccentric and silly to most people around him, especially his family. At his core, he is a very kind and gentle man and an extremely dedicated father with a strong sense of humor. Although he and his wife fostered a tight-knit, loving family, a running gag throughout the series is his thwarted attempts to get the grown children to leave the house. Even when he succeeded at this, more issues would come, such as Sondra finally leaving to marry her husband Elvin, only to move into a squalid tenement (albeit with Cliff's full support, as he and Clair struggled in the early years of their marriage), or Denise marrying a Navy officer with a child from a prior marriage, and Cliff now acclimating to a blended family.

Very playful, Cliff enjoys competition, often making bets with Clair over various things, such as the date a certain jazz song was released or having a "Smooth Contest" to see which of them looked more elegant for a night on the town, as judged by the children. He also plays a monthly game of pinochle against his father and some friends, which sometimes gets very passionate. Unfortunately, Cliff often finds himself on the losing end of most of his bets and games. For example, he had never beaten his father-in-law at chess. However, Cliff eventually broke this losing streak at pinochle against his father and his friend Homer Dobson with the help of Dr. Foster (portrayed by Roscoe Lee Browne), an expert pinochle player who also happened to be his and Clair's literary professor at Hillman College.

== Reception ==
Bill Cosby's role as Cliff Huxtable has had a mostly positive reception from critics. The character also inspired Dr. Hibbert in The Simpsons.
