= College Magazine =

College-guide and quarterly magazine

- Categories: Advice and entertainment
- Publisher: Amanda Nachman
- Founded: 2007
- Website: www.collegemagazine.com

College Magazine is a college-guide and quarterly magazine, written and edited by college students, created in 2007 by publisher and founder Amanda Nachman. The website offers guides to over 100 colleges nationwide and college rankings. Both site and magazine feature articles on academic advice, career tips, student success stories, NCAA sports features, dating advice and celebrity interviews. Past issues have featured musicians, athletes and celebrities including Mike Posner, Kate Voegele, Sara Bareilles, Nastia Liukin, Kim Kardashian, Glenn Howerton and Chelsea Handler.

As of 2011, the print publication reaches 200,000 students at 14 universities in Washington D.C., Maryland, Philadelphia and Florida. College Magazine moved fully online in 2012, since then, it reaches millions of students nationwide.

== History ==
Nachman developed College Magazine during her senior year of college for an entrepreneurship class at the University of Maryland and launched the first issue in September 2007. The first issue was distributed solely in College Park. The next year, the company landed $150K of seed funding. By early 2009, 45 students and a lecturer were writing regularly for the magazine.

College Magazine articles are written by students and the cover-features focus on students with success stories. Nachman said of the publication, "I wanted this to be more than just a how-to guide ... This is a chance for other students to be inspired by their peers' experiences."

In April 2009, College Magazine's business plan won first prize in the University of Maryland's "Cupid's Cup" Business Competition sponsored by Kevin Plank.

By 2012 the magazine had expanded to a 40,000 circulation across Washington, DC, Baltimore, MD, and Philadelphia, PA. Advertisers included Vitaminwater, Princeton Review and TGIFridays.

Since moving fully online in 2012, College Magazine has had hundreds of staff writers and editors complete their writer training program, providing students with essential digital journalism skills including SEO, finding high quality sources and social media promotion.

== Contributors ==
Magazine editors and staff writers are students from universities nationwide. Most find out about the magazine through journalism listservs or online and apply online at collegemagazine.com with a writing sample and details of where they've been published before. Editors must have previous experience writing and editing for a college level publication as well as leadership experiences.

College Magazine graduates have gone on to careers at Mashable, Vox, NBC, Seventeen Magazine, U.S. News & World Report, Redbook, National Geographic, Penguin Random House, Rachael Ray Magazine and Washingtonian.

== Features ==
CollegeMagazine.com has college features on over 100 campuses nationwide. These guides include tuition information, an overview of the campus life, top majors, popular campus clubs and interviews with students. As well they are known for their college rankings.

The site also provides students with written articles on the topics of dating, academic and career success, dorm life and roommates, social life, celebrities, entertainment and popular culture. Articles include interviews with experts in their fields, professors, students and celebrities.

In 2017 on International Women’s Day, College Magazine announced their 50by2050 initiative to achieve 50% of women in congress by 2050 in partnership with EMILY’s List, Emerge America, Human Rights Campaign, Higher Heights, She Should Run, Victory Fund, IGNITE and Running start. In this campaign College Magazine featured interviews with power women leaders including Senator Tammy Baldwin, Senator Tammy Duckworth, Senator Toni Atkins, policy advocate and NYTs Bestselling author Heather McGhee, and delegate Danica Roem.

With over 10,000 articles published since its inception, CollegeMagazine.com includes guides to 100+ academic majors, an internship database with listings of opportunities for students at companies nationwide, study abroad destination reviews and gift guides specific to college students.
