= Joseph C. Phillips =

American actor

- Born: Joseph Connor Phillips; January 17, 1962 (age 64); Denver, Colorado, U.S.
- Occupations: Actor; writer; commentator
- Years active: 1985–present
- Political party: Republican
- Spouse: Nicole Phillips (m. 1994)
- Children: 3

Joseph Connor Phillips (born January 17, 1962) is an American actor, writer, and conservative Christian commentator. He is best known for his role as Martin Kendall on the NBC sitcom The Cosby Show, and as Justus Ward on the soap opera General Hospital.

== Career ==
After graduating from the Professional Theatre Training Program at New York University, Phillips appeared on stage in theatre productions at the Manhattan Bridge Company, Philadelphia Festival Theatre for New Plays, Repertory Theatre of St. Louis, and a starring role in the world premiere of Toni Morrison's Dreaming Emmett at Capital Repertory Theatre in 1986.

Amid radio and television commercials, Phillips landed a guest role on the soap opera Search for Tomorrow and a second-season appearance on the NBC sitcom The Cosby Show. Four years later, he returned to The Cosby Show in his most notable role, that of U.S. Navy Lieutenant Martin Kendall, which he portrayed from 1989 to 1991.

He portrayed attorney Justus Ward on the ABC soap opera General Hospital from 1994 to 1998. Phillips was also a guest political commentator on News & Notes on most NPR radio stations between 2004 and 2009.

== Education and associations ==
Phillips is a member of Alpha Phi Alpha fraternity. He attended the University of the Pacific as a communications major, but later transferred to the acting conservatory at New York University where he graduated with a BFA in acting in 1983.

Phillips is an ambassador for the Sickle Cell Disease Association of America. He has spoken extensively about the disease and its effect on the family. He is also a member of the Screen Actors Guild, American Federation of Television and Radio Artists, Actors Equity Association, the Academy of Television Arts and Sciences, was National Co-Chair of the African American Steering committee for Bush Cheney '04, was named a member of the Republican National Committee's African American Advisory Board, was appointed by Governor Arnold Schwarzenegger to the state board of directors of the California African American Museum and was named a 2005 Claremont Institute Lincoln Fellow.

In 2022, Phillips joined the faculty of Clark Atlanta University as a professor in the theatre and communications department.

== Conservative activism ==
Phillips, a Republican, is a television and radio commentator and has written a weekly syndicated column that promotes conservative views. He has been a critic of affirmative action and same-sex marriage in the United States. His book, He Talk Like a White Boy, reflects his thoughts in this regard.

== Personal life ==
Joseph Phillips' mother died when he was young. After this, he became close to the mother of Duane Evans, his cousin. Phillips is from Colorado. He and his wife Nicole have three sons, Connor, Ellis, and Samuel. Phillips and Nicole divorced in January 2019. In 2006, Phillips published an autobiography, He Talk Like A White Boy, which includes a foreword by Tavis Smiley.

== Filmography ==
n.b. for credit listings reference

=== Film ===
Year	Film	Role	Other notes
1991	Strictly Business	Waymon Tinsdale III	
1998	A Fare to Remember		Supporting actor
1998	Let's Talk About Sex	Michael	
2005	Getting Played	Robert Mitchellson	
2010	Church	Melvin	
2010	Boogie Town	Chief Salsbury	

=== Television ===
Year	Title	Role	Notes
1985	Search for Tomorrow	Cruiser McCulla	
1985	The Cosby Show	Darryl Marchamp	Episode: "Cliff in Love"
1988	Hothouse	Guest star	Episode: "The Good Family"
1989–1992	The Cosby Show	Lt. Martin Kendall	Main role (Seasons 6–8)
1989	A Raisin in the Sun	George Murchison	TV movie
1989	A Man Called Hawk	Matt Johnson	Episode: "Poison"
1989	A Different World	Lt. Martin Kendall	Episode: "Forever Hold Your Peace"
1993	Basic Values: Sex, Shock & Censorship in the '90s		Supporting actor
1994–1998	General Hospital	Justus Ward	Main role
1995	Martin	Derrick	Episode: "The Ex-Files"
1996	Soul Train	Host	Episode: "Brian McKnight/ Goodie Mob/ Barrio Boyzz"
1996	Living Single	Jeremy Mills IV	Episode: "Not So Silent Partner"
1997	The Larry Sanders Show	James	Episode: "The Book"
1999	Any Day Now	Mark Sanborn	Episode: "Family Is Family"
2000	Midnight Blue	Luke Jordan	TV movie
2000	Perfect Murder, Perfect Town	Det. McKinley (Alternative title: Perfect Murder, Perfect Town: JonBenét and the City of Boulder)	TV movie
2000	City of Angels	Martin	Episode: "To Have or Halve Not"
2000	Popular	Harrison's Doctor	Episode: "Ur-ine Trouble"
2001	The Parkers	Rev. Reggie Wright	Episode: "Mama, I Want to Sing"
2001	The King of Queens	Bill	Episode: "Separation Anxiety"
2001	Judging Amy	Lowry's Attorney	Episode: "Look Closer"
2001	V.I.P.	Geiger	Episode: 'Kayus Ex Machina"
2002	Family Law	Abram Hatch	Episode: "Children of a Lesser Dad"
2002–2003	The District	Mayor Morgan Douglas	Recurring role
2004	E!'s 101	Interviewee	Episode: "Most Awesome Moments in Entertainment 60 - 41"
2004–2005	Las Vegas	Langley	Episodes: "Blood Is Thicker" & "Centennial"
2005	Jack & Bobby	Coach Braxton	Episode: "Friends with Benefits"
2005–2006	Without a Trace	Marcus Johnson	Recurring role
2006	Vanished	J.T. Morse	Recurring role
2007	Ghost Whisperer	Richard Vahn	Episode: "No Safe Place"
2008	The Young and the Restless	Agent Jed Paulson	3 episodes
2008	Bones	Col. Ryan Wolchuck	Episode: "The Con Man in the Meth Lab"
2009	Castle	Mayor	Episodes: "Home Is Where the Heart Stops" & "Ghosts"
2010	The Secret Life of the American Teenager	Donnie	Episode: "Loved and Lost"
2010	The Mentalist	Alan Knee	Episode: "Blood In, Blood Out"
2010	The Event	Security Guard	Episodes: "I Haven't Told You Everything" & "To Keep Us Safe"
2016	Dispatch	Detective Arnold	
2017-2020	13 Reasons Why	Greg Davis	Recurring role
2018	The Rookie	Lawyer Jephson Green	Episode: "Homefront"
2020	The Resident	Talk Show Host	Episode: "Last Shot"
2020	Criminal Minds	Deputy Director James Barbour	3 episodes

== Awards and nominations ==
Year	Nominated work	Association	Category	Result	ref
1997	General Hospital	NAACP Image Awards	Outstanding Actor in a Daytime Drama Series	Nominated	
1998	General Hospital	NAACP Image Awards	Outstanding Actor in a Daytime Drama Series	Nominated	
1999	General Hospital	NAACP Image Awards	Outstanding Actor in a Daytime Drama Series	Nominated	

== See also ==
- Black conservatism in the United States
