= Jamie Broadnax =

American journalist

- Born: April 24, 1980 (age 46); Portsmouth, Virginia, U.S.
- Education: Norfolk State University (BA); Regent University (MA)
- Occupations: Film critic, writer

Jamie Broadnax (born April 24, 1980) is an American film critic, podcaster, and writer, known for founding and being editor-in-chief and CEO of the Black Girl Nerds community.

== Biography ==
Broadnax, who has a master's degree in Film and Marketing, started her career in film by working on several film shoots in various positions. Broadnax became a film critic, is a member of the Critics Choice Association, and, as a freelancer, has written about films for numerous publications, including HuffPost, the New York Post, Variety, and Vulture.

In 2014, Broadnax was accredited by MSNBC's TheGrio 100. She has been described as "one of the biggest up-and-coming names in black-nerd pop culture" (by The Root's Jason Johnson) and as "one of the most important makers of 2016" (by Paste's Shannon M. Houston). In an October 2015 guest appearance on Melissa Harris-Perry, Broadnax talked about diversity in comics at New York Comic Con. She has also co-hosted the Misty Knight's Uninformed Afro podcast about black superheroines, and in April 2017, she co-launched the #NoConfederate hashtag campaign in response to HBO's plan to produce a series – Confederate – with the premise "What if the Confederacy never lost?".

Broadnax has hosted panel discussions on other multimedia, including the panel at the A Wrinkle in Time (2018) premiere at the El Capitan Theatre and the Sorry to Bother You panel at the 2018 Sundance Film Festival.

Mid 2018, after co-founding "Universal FanCon" and running a successful Kickstarter campaign for the convention, Broadnax was caught up in the controversy surrounding the convention being cancelled and she then released a public statement, stepping back temporarily from a leadership role to regroup.

== Black Girl Nerds ==
Black Girl Nerds initially started as a Blogspot journal, where Broadnax wrote about various topics, including her own online dating experiences. In 2013, Black Weblog Awards awarded Black Girl Nerds "Best Podcast". The community gradually became more mainstream, in particular after a shout-out by Shonda Rhimes in the September 2014 issue of Marie Claire. In October 2015, HuffPost named Black Girl Nerds one of the leading Black Podcasts. Late 2017, its website had over 200,000 monthly visitors.

== See also ==
- Geek girl
- Minority group
