= Theodore Huxtable =

Fictional character in The Cosby Show

Theo Huxtable
- The Cosby Show character
- First appearance: "Pilot"
- Last appearance: "And So We Commence"
- Created by: Bill Cosby
- Portrayed by: Malcolm-Jamal Warner

In-universe information
- Aliases: Teddy and Theodore "Theo" Huxtable
- Gender: Male
- Family: Cliff Huxtable (father); Clair Huxtable (mother); Sondra Huxtable (oldest sister); Denise Huxtable (older sister); Vanessa Huxtable (younger sister); Rudy Huxtable (youngest sister)
- Relatives: Russell Huxtable (paternal grandfather); Anna Huxtable (paternal grandmother); Al Hanks (maternal grandfather); Carrie Hanks (maternal grandmother); Nelson Tibideaux (nephew); Winnie Tibideaux (niece); Olivia Kendall (step-niece); Pam Tucker (cousin)
- Nationality: American

Theodore Aloysius "Theo" Huxtable is a fictional character who appears in the American sitcom The Cosby Show, portrayed by actor Malcolm-Jamal Warner.

== Conception ==
Theo Huxtable was based on Bill Cosby's only son Ennis Cosby. He also gave the character dyslexia as his son also had the condition. Theo's disability is revealed in episode "Theo's Gift".

== Role ==
Theo is the only son of Cliff and Clair Huxtable, and the middle child of their five children. At the beginning of the series, he is a freshman in high school who consistently gets poor grades, to his parents' consternation. Following graduation, he enrolls at New York University to study psychology at the start of the fifth season. After struggling with his coursework through much of his freshman year, he is diagnosed with dyslexia and adopts new study habits that lead to a marked improvement in his grades. Near the end of his junior year, Theo is assigned to work as a student teacher at a local community center and takes particular interest in helping a boy with a learning disability similar to his own. During the eighth and final season, he is offered a job in San Francisco but turns it down, deciding to continue working at the community center and to enter graduate school. The series finale focuses on Theo's college graduation, with Cliff reminiscing on the trouble his son had in high school.

== Reception ==
Theo Huxtable has had a mostly positive reception from viewers. The character also won praise about discussing dyslexia. Warner was nominated for the Primetime Emmy Award for Outstanding Supporting Actor in a Comedy Series in 1986, making him the youngest nominee in that category as of 1986.
