= The Cosby Show =

American television sitcom (1984–1992)

- Genre: Sitcom
- Created by: Bill Cosby; Ed. Weinberger; Michael J. Leeson
- Directed by: Jay Sandrich
- Starring: Bill Cosby; Phylicia Rashad; Sabrina Le Beauf; Geoffrey Owens; Lisa Bonet; Joseph C. Phillips; Malcolm-Jamal Warner; Tempestt Bledsoe; Keshia Knight Pulliam; Raven-Symoné; Erika Alexander
- Theme music composer: Stu Gardner; Bill Cosby
- Opening theme: "Kiss Me"; performed by: Bobby McFerrin (season 4); James DePreist performed by The Oregon Symphony Orchestra (season 5); Craig Handy (seasons 6–7); Lester Bowie (season 8)
- Ending theme: "Kiss Me" (instrumental; various versions)
- Composers: Stu Gardner; Arthur Lisi
- Country of origin: United States
- Original language: English
- No. of seasons: 8
- No. of episodes: 201 (and outtakes special) (list of episodes)

Production
- Executive producers: Marcy Carsey; Tom Werner; Bernie Kukoff; Janet Leahy; Bill Cosby (season 8)
- Production locations: NBC Studios Brooklyn; Brooklyn, New York, U.S.; Kaufman Astoria Studios; Astoria, New York, U.S.
- Camera setup: Videotape; Multi-camera
- Running time: 23–24 minutes
- Production company: Carsey-Werner Productions

Original release
- Network: NBC
- Release: September 20, 1984 – April 30, 1992

Related
- A Different World; A Different World (2026)

The Cosby Show is an American television sitcom created by (along with Ed. Weinberger and Michael J. Leeson) and starring Bill Cosby that originally aired on NBC from September 20, 1984, to April 30, 1992, with a total of 201 half-hour episodes spanning eight seasons, including an outtakes special. The show focuses on the Huxtables, an upper middle-class Black American family living in Brooklyn, New York; the series was based on routines in Cosby's stand-up comedy act, which in turn were based on his family life. The series spawned a spin-off, titled A Different World, which ran from September 24, 1987, to July 9, 1993, with a total of six seasons consisting of 144 episodes.

TV Guide listed the series as "TV's biggest hit in the 1980s", adding it "almost single-handedly revived the sitcom genre and NBC's ratings fortunes", while also ranking it 28th on their list of 50 Greatest Shows; with this list, Cliff Huxtable was named as the "Greatest Television Dad" in 2014. In May 1992, Entertainment Weekly stated that The Cosby Show helped to make possible a larger variety of shows with a predominantly black cast, from In Living Color to The Fresh Prince of Bel-Air.

The Cosby Show spent five consecutive seasons as television's top-rated show and is one of only two sitcoms in Nielsen ratings history—the other being All in the Family—to finish at number one for five seasons, remaining in the top 20 for its entire run. It also remains the only scripted TV show with a predominantly African-American cast to top the Nielsen ratings, and to do so more than once. Its spinoff, A Different World, also became a ratings hit, featuring in the top 5 of the ratings for four of its six seasons. It launched the extended cast into stardom and Cosby, having already had a successful career on television, films and stand-up, became the highest paid actor on television.

It was also an international hit, garnering a following from across the world being a regular fixture in markets previously considered unattainable for African-American leads, such as Europe, where the show became a ratings and commercial hit and cemented itself as an international icon of 1980s pop culture. Its effects on Black American portrayal and gender politics on television were a major part of its success. The portrayal of Clair Huxtable, the matriarch of the Huxtable family, by Phylicia Rashad sparked an international wave of working mothers on television dubbed the "Clair Huxtable effect", and Bill Cosby was nicknamed "America's Dad" for his highly celebrated portrayal of Cliff Huxtable. The colorful sweaters he wore as Cliff became a fashion trend for a time which was temporarily revived in the early 2010s. Another sitcom starring Cosby and Rashad, Cosby, aired on CBS from 1996 to 2000, notable for its differences to The Cosby Show, garnering positive reviews. Since 2014, reruns of The Cosby Show have been pulled from several networks and venues as a result of the Bill Cosby sexual assault cases.

== Premise ==
The show focuses on the Huxtable family, an upper middle class African-American family, living in a brownstone in Brooklyn Heights, New York, at 10 Stigwood Avenue. The father is Cliff Huxtable, an obstetrician and son of a prominent jazz trombonist. The mother is his wife, lawyer Clair Huxtable.

They have four daughters and one son: Sondra, Denise, Theo, Vanessa, and Rudy. Despite its comedic tone, the show sometimes involves serious subjects, like Theo's experiences dealing with dyslexia, inspired by Cosby's dyslexic son Ennis, and teenage pregnancy when Denise's friend Veronica (Lela Rochon) becomes pregnant.

=== Episodes ===
Season	Episodes	Originally released		HH rating rank	Avg. HH rating	Avg. viewers (millions)
Season	Episodes	First released	Last released	HH rating rank	Avg. HH rating	Avg. viewers (millions)
1	24	September 20, 1984	May 9, 1985	3	24.2	20.54
2	25	September 26, 1985	May 15, 1986	1	33.7	28.94
3	25	September 25, 1986	May 7, 1987	1	34.9	30.50
4	24	September 24, 1987	April 28, 1988	1	27.8	—N/a
5	26	October 6, 1988	May 11, 1989	1	25.6	40.3
6	26 (+ special)	September 21, 1989	May 3, 1990	1 (tied with Roseanne)	23.1	36.6
7	26	September 20, 1990	May 2, 1991	5	17.1	26.7
8	25	September 19, 1991	April 30, 1992	18	15.0	24.2

=== Pilot ===
The Cosby Show pilot episode uses the same title sequence as the rest of the first season, and is widely regarded as the first episode. However, it contains a number of differences from the remainder of the series.

In the pilot, the Huxtables have only four children. Following the pilot, the Huxtables have five children, with the addition of their eldest daughter, Sondra (Sabrina Le Beauf), who is mentioned in episode four and appears first in episode 11. The character was created when Bill Cosby wanted the show to express the accomplishment of successfully raising a child who had graduated from college.

Bill Cosby originally wanted Vanessa Williams to play the part of Sondra due to her college education and background in theater arts. However, Williams had recently been crowned the first Black Miss America and pageant officials would not permit her to play the role while she was representing the Miss America pageant. Whitney Houston was also considered for the role of Denise Huxtable, but was unable to commit to the full-time television production schedule in the NBC contract, as she intended to become a full-time music recording artist.

Most of the story in the pilot presentation is taken from Bill Cosby's 1983 comedy film Bill Cosby: Himself. Cosby's character is called "Clifford" in the early episodes of the first season, but his name was later switched to "Heathcliff".

Additionally, Vanessa refers to Theo as "Teddy" twice in the dining room scene. The interior of the Huxtables' home features an entirely different living room from subsequent episodes, and different color schemes in the dining room and the master bedroom. Throughout the remainder of the series, the dining room is reserved for more formal occasions.

== Background and production ==
=== Conception and development ===
The cast of The Cosby Show in 1989

In the early 1980s, Marcy Carsey and Tom Werner, two former executives at ABC, left the network to start their own production company: Carsey-Werner. At ABC, they had overseen sitcoms such as Mork & Mindy, Three's Company, and Welcome Back, Kotter. The two partners decided that to get a sitcom to sell for their fledgling company, they needed a big name behind it. Bill Cosby had performed stand-up comedy with award-winning albums and starred in several genres in TV and film in the 1960s and 70s, but his career had become more static by the early 1980s. According to a Chicago Tribune article from July 1985, despite Carsey and Werner's connection to the network, Lewis Erlicht, president of ABC Entertainment, passed on the show, prompting a pitch to rival network, NBC.

Outside of his work on his cartoon series Fat Albert and the Cosby Kids, Cosby was doing little in film or television, but Carsey and Werner were fans of Cosby's stand-up comedy and thought it would be the perfect material for a family sitcom.

Cosby originally proposed that the couple should both have blue-collar jobs, with the father a limousine driver, who owned his own car, and the mother an electrician. With advice from his wife Camille Cosby, though, the concept was changed so that the family was well-off financially, with the mother a lawyer and the father a physician.

Cosby wanted the program to be educational, reflecting his own background in education. He also insisted that the program be taped in New York City instead of Los Angeles, where most television programs were taped. The Huxtable home exterior was filmed at 10 St. Luke's Place near 7th Avenue in Manhattan's Greenwich Village (although in the show, the residence was the fictional "10 Stigwood Avenue").

=== Production notes ===
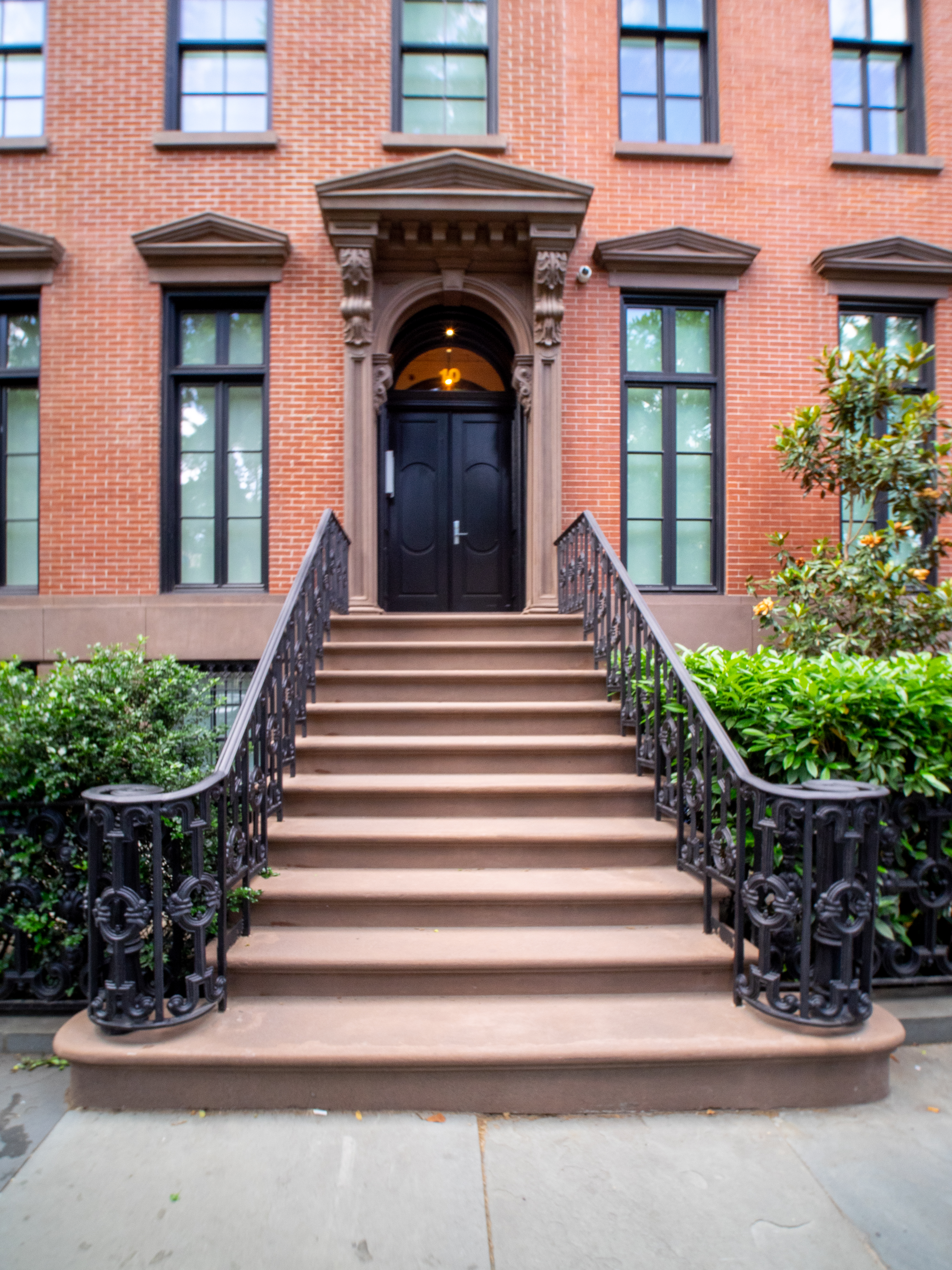
The brownstone used in The Cosby Show

Early episodes were videotaped at NBC's Brooklyn studios (subsequently JC Studios). The network later sold that building, and production moved to the Kaufman Astoria Studios in Queens. Even though the show was set to take place in Brooklyn, the exterior façade was actually of a brownstone townhouse located in Manhattan's Greenwich Village at 10 Leroy Street/10 St. Luke's Place. The pilot was filmed in May 1984, with season one's production commencing that July, and the first taping on August 1 (Goodbye Mr. Goldfish).

During its original NBC run, it was one of five successful sitcoms on the network that featured predominantly African-American casts. The others were 227 (1985–90), Amen (1986–91), Cosby Show spin-off A Different World (1987–93) and The Fresh Prince of Bel-Air Although the cast and characters were predominantly African-American, the program was unusual in that issues of race were rarely mentioned when compared to other situation comedies of the time with predominantly African-American casts, such as The Jeffersons. However, The Cosby Show had African-American themes, such as the Civil rights movement, and it frequently promoted African-American culture and culture of Africa represented by artists and musicians such as Jacob Lawrence, Miles Davis, James Brown, B. B. King, Stevie Wonder, Sammy Davis Jr., Lena Horne, Duke Ellington, Dizzy Gillespie and Miriam Makeba.

Chris Rock was considered for the role of Theo's best friend Cockroach, which eventually went to Payne.

The spin-off, A Different World, dealt with racial issues more often. The Cosby Show's series finale, taped March 6, 1992, aired during the 1992 Los Angeles riots, with Cosby quoted in media at the time pleading for peace.

During the third season, Rashad was pregnant with her daughter Condola. Rather than write this pregnancy in, the producers simply greatly reduced Rashad's scenes or filmed in such a way that her pregnancy was not noticeable.

Another main cast member pregnancy, that of Bonet, almost caused the actress to be fired, especially coming in the wake of appearing in the film Angel Heart, which contained explicit sexual scenes with actor Mickey Rourke. Cosby strongly disapproved of Bonet's role, but allowed her to continue on World until returning to Cosby after her pregnancy. Tensions remained, however, and Bonet was eventually fired in April 1991.

=== Theme song and opening sequence ===
The show's theme music, "Kiss Me", was composed by Stu Gardner and Bill Cosby. Seven versions of this theme were used during the run of the series, all variations of Cosby's 1974 song by the same name, from his album At Last Bill Cosby Really Sings. For season four, the theme song music was performed by musician Bobby McFerrin.

Due to legal complications regarding the background mural, the opening for season seven (filmed on August 17, 1990 at Kaufman Astoria Studios in New York City, New York), was replaced with the one from the previous season. The original season seven opening, with slight modifications, returned to use in the beginning of season eight.

== Cast and characters ==
Actor	Character	Seasons							
Actor	Character	1	2	3	4	5	6	7	8
Bill Cosby	Cliff Huxtable	Main	Main	Main	Main	Main	Main	Main	Main
Phylicia Rashad (Note: Rashad was credited as "Phylicia Ayers-Allen" during season one and the first fourteen episodes of season two.)	Clair Huxtable	Main	Main	Main	Main	Main	Main	Main	Main
Lisa Bonet	Denise Huxtable Kendall	Main	Main	Main	Recurring	Recurring	Main	Main	
Malcolm-Jamal Warner	Theodore Huxtable	Main	Main	Main	Main	Main	Main	Main	Main
Tempestt Bledsoe	Vanessa Huxtable	Main	Main	Main	Main	Main	Main	Main	Main
Keshia Knight Pulliam	Rudy Huxtable	Main	Main	Main	Main	Main	Main	Main	Main
Sabrina Le Beauf	Sondra Huxtable Tibideaux	Recurring	Main	Main	Main	Main	Main	Main	Main
Geoffrey Owens	Elvin Tibideaux		Recurring	Recurring	Main	Main	Main	Main	Main
Joseph C. Phillips (Note: Prior to joining the cast as a regular, Phillips appears as Daryl, a potential boyfriend for Sondra in season two (episode: "Cliff in Love").)	Lt. Martin Kendall						Main	Main	Recurring
Raven-Symoné	Olivia Kendall						Main	Main	Main
Erika Alexander	Pamela "Pam" Tucker							Main	Main

== Reception and legacy ==
The show's portrayal of a successful, stable black family was praised by some for breaking racial stereotypes and showing another part of the African-American experience. However, it was criticized by others, including Henry Louis Gates Jr., for allowing white audiences to think that racism and poverty were problems of the past. Phylicia Rashad claimed that when she met Nelson Mandela, he told her that he "is eternally grateful for the show and its influence on Apartheid and us Black people. [The inmates in prison] watched the show while in prison." As a result of the Bill Cosby sexual assault cases, Malcolm-Jamal Warner has stated that the show's legacy is "tarnished".

The Cosby Show had generated $2.5 billion in television revenue, including $1 billion from television advertisements, and $1.5 billion from syndication.

=== Broadcast history and ratings ===
The Cosby Show aired on Thursdays at 8:00 pm for all eight seasons. In its first season, the show was the beginning of a Thursday NBC schedule that was followed by Family Ties, Cheers, Night Court, and Hill Street Blues.

The Cosby Show is one of three television programs (All in the Family and American Idol being the others) that were number one in the Nielsen ratings for five consecutive seasons.

Viewership and ratings per season of The Cosby Show
Season	Time slot (ET)	Episodes	First aired			Last aired			TV season	Rank	Avg. HH rating
Season	Time slot (ET)	Episodes	Date	HH rating	Viewers (millions)	Date	HH rating	Viewers (millions)	TV season	Rank	Avg. HH rating
1	Thursday 8:00 pm	24	September 20, 1984	21.6	—N/a	May 9, 1985	24.1	—N/a	1984–85	3	24.2
2	Thursday 8:00 pm	25	September 26, 1985	31.6	—N/a	May 15, 1986	31.8	—N/a	1985–86	1	33.7
3	Thursday 8:00 pm	25	September 25, 1986	33.5	—N/a	May 7, 1987	26.4	—N/a	1986–87	1	34.9
4	Thursday 8:00 pm	24	September 24, 1987	31.5	—N/a	April 28, 1988	23.2	—N/a	1987–88	1	27.8
5	Thursday 8:00 pm	26	October 6, 1988	24.2	37.6	May 11, 1989	20.4	31.5	1988–89	1	25.6
6	Thursday 8:00 pm	26	September 21, 1989	26.1	39.3	May 3, 1990	18.5	28.3	1989–90	1 (Note: Tied with Roseanne)	23.1
7	Thursday 8:00 pm	26	September 20, 1990	19.8	30.5	May 2, 1991	15.2	22.1	1990–91	5	17.1
8	Thursday 8:00 pm	25	September 19, 1991	18.6	28.1	April 30, 1992	28.0	44.4	1991–92	18	15.0

== Syndication ==
The Carsey-Werner Company handles domestic distribution, while Paramount Global's unit CBS Media Ventures handles international distribution of the series, and has done so since 1997. In the United States, The Cosby Show began its television syndication run in September 1988 in broadcast syndication, shortly before the show's fifth-season premiere, and was at the time distributed by Viacom; many stations that carried the series were Big Three television networks affiliates. As time went on, this moved to lower-profile timeslots, independent station and minor network affiliates.

Fort Worth, Texas–based independent station KTVT carried the series until 1995, when it ceased operating as a regional cable superstation and became an affiliate of CBS. TBS, then a national cable superstation, carried the series for nearly a decade beginning in 1999. Fellow superstation WGN America began carrying the series shortly thereafter, and continued to until September 2010. Viacom's Nick at Nite began airing reruns of the series in March 2002, and its sister network TV Land began airing reruns in 2004, making The Cosby Show one of the few series that were shown on both Nick at Nite and TV Land at the same time. The series was also available to stream on Hulu.

The French version just called Cosby Show aired on M6 in 1988.

In the Italian version of the show, the family name is not Huxtable but Robinson. The whole show is named I Robinson (The Robinsons) airing on Canale 5 from 1986 until 1993.

=== 2010s removal from syndication ===
Reruns of The Cosby Show have been pulled from several networks and venues as a result of the Bill Cosby sexual assault cases. In November 2014, TV Land pulled the series from its lineup. "Episodes have been pulled immediately for the foreseeable future ... TV Land even removed references to The Cosby Show from its website on Wednesday afternoon as the scandal accelerated." In December 2014, the Magic Johnson–owned network Aspire removed the show from its lineup.

BET's Centric (another Viacom unit), along with Bounce TV, ceased airing reruns of The Cosby Show. At the same time, barter syndicator The Program Exchange ceased distributing the show. Bounce TV resumed airing the series in December 2016 but pulled the show on April 26, 2018—the day Cosby was convicted of sexual assault. TV One began airing reruns of the show in May 2017. It is the only American network to offer the series. The series is available on Amazon Prime Video and Philo.

== Spin-off ==
The Cosby Show's producers created a spin-off series called A Different World that was built around the "Denise" character (portrayed by actress Lisa Bonet), the second of the Huxtables' four daughters. Initially, the new program dealt with Denise's life at Hillman College, the fictional historically black college from which her father, mother, and paternal grandfather had graduated.

Denise was written out of A Different World after its inaugural season, due to Bonet's pregnancy, and the following season was revamped, with the addition of director Debbie Allen (Phylicia Rashad's sister) and new characters. Denise later became a recurring character on The Cosby Show for seasons four and five, and a regular again in seasons six and seven.

== Awards and honors ==
=== Awards won ===
Emmy Award

- Outstanding Comedy Series (1985)
- Outstanding Writing in a Comedy Series (1985) – Michael J. Leeson and Ed. Weinberger for the pilot episode
- Outstanding Directing in a Comedy Series (1985) – Jay Sandrich for "The Younger Woman"
- Outstanding Directing in a Comedy Series (1986) – Jay Sandrich for "Denise's Friend"
- Outstanding Guest Performer in a Comedy Series (1986) – Roscoe Lee Browne for "The Card Game"
- Outstanding Editing for a Series – Multi-Camera Production (1986) – Henry Chan for "Full House"

Golden Globe Awards

- Best TV Series – Comedy (1985)
- Best Performance by an Actor in a TV Series – Comedy – Bill Cosby (1985, 1986) 2 wins

NAACP Image Awards

- Outstanding Comedy Series (1988)
- Outstanding Actress in a Comedy Series – Phylicia Rashad (1988, 1989) 2 wins
- Outstanding Actor in a Comedy Series – Bill Cosby (1989, 1993) 2 wins

Peabody Award (1986)

People's Choice Awards

- Favorite New TV Comedy Program (1985)
- Favorite Male Performer in a New TV Program – Bill Cosby (1985)
- Favorite Female Performer in a New TV Program – Phylicia Rashad (1985)
- Favorite TV Comedy Program (1985–89) 5 wins
- Favorite Male TV Performer – Bill Cosby (1986–92) 7 wins
- Favorite All-Around Male Entertainer – Bill Cosby (1986–88, 1990–91) 5 wins
- Favorite Young TV Performer – Keshia Knight Pulliam (1988)
- All-Time Favorite TV Program (1989)
- Favorite Female TV Performer – Phylicia Rashad (1989)
- Favorite All-Around Male Star – Bill Cosby (1989)
- Favorite TV Comedy Series (1990, 1992) 2 wins

=== Nominations ===
Emmy Awards

- Outstanding Technical Direction/Electronic Camerawork/video control for a series – 1985
- Outstanding Live and Tape Sound Mixing and Sound Effects for a series – (1985) 2 nominations
- Outstanding Writing in a Comedy Series – (1985–86)
- Outstanding Lead Actress in a Comedy Series – Phylicia Rashad (1985–86) 2 nominations
- Outstanding Comedy Series (1986–87) 2 nominations
- Outstanding Supporting Actress in a Comedy Series – Lisa Bonet (1986)
- Outstanding Supporting Actress in a Comedy Series – Keshia Knight Pulliam (1986)
- Outstanding Supporting Actor in a Comedy Series – Malcolm-Jamal Warner (1986)
- Outstanding Sound Mixing for a Comedy Series or a Special – (1986–87)
- Outstanding Editing for a Series (multi camera production) – (1987)
- Outstanding Directing in a Comedy Series – Jay Sandrich (1987)
- Outstanding Comedy Series – (1987)
- Outstanding Guest Performer in a Comedy Series – Eileen Heckart (1988)
- Outstanding Guest Actor in a Comedy Series – Sammy Davis Jr. (1989)

Golden Globe Awards

- Best TV Series – Comedy – (1986–1987) – Two nominations
- Best Performance by an Actor in a TV Series – Comedy – Bill Cosby (1987)

=== Other honors ===
- 1993: TV Guide named The Cosby Show the All-Time Best Family Show in its issue celebrating 40 years of television.
- 1997: TV Guide ranked the episode "Happy Anniversary" #54 on their list of the TV Guide's 100 Greatest Episodes of All Time
- 1999: Entertainment Weekly placed show's debut at #24 in its list of the "100 Greatest Moments in Television"
- 2002: TV Guide placed The Cosby Show at #28 in its list of the TV Guide's 50 Greatest TV Shows of All Time
- 2004: TV Guide ranked Cliff Huxtable number 1 on its 50 Greatest TV Dads of All Time list
- 2004: Bravo ranked Cliff Huxtable #44 on its list of the 100 Greatest TV Characters
- 2007: Time magazine placed the show on its unranked list of "100 Best TV Shows of All-TIME"
- 2007: USA Today's web site ranked the show as #8 in its list of the "top 25 TV moments of the past quarter century"
- 2008: Entertainment Weekly selected Cliff Huxtable as the Dad for "The Perfect TV Family"
- 2013: TV Guide ranked The Cosby Show #26 on its list of the 60 Best Series.
- 2013: The Writers Guild of America ranked The Cosby Show #29 on their list of the 101 Best Written TV Series.
- 2023: Variety ranked The Cosby Show #90 on its list of the 100 greatest TV shows of all time.

== Albums ==
Two albums were produced that included various theme and background music from the show. The albums were presented by longtime Cosby collaborator Stu Gardner. They were:

- A House Full of Love: Music from The Cosby Show (1986)
- Total Happiness (Music from the Bill Cosby Show, Vol. II) (1987)

== In popular culture ==
- During the series' run, the character of Cliff Huxtable frequently wore an array of knit sweaters that were often brightly colored and featured abstract, asymmetrical patterns or themes. The sweaters were erroneously thought to be designed by the Australian clothing company Coogi, but were actually designed by Dutchman Koos Van Den Akker.
  - They were dubbed "Cosby sweaters", a term that is used to describe sweaters that are generally deemed garish and unappealing. In May 2008, Cosby's daughter Evin auctioned a batch of the sweaters that her father had kept on eBay. The proceeds of the sales went to the Hello Friend/Ennis William Cosby Foundation, a non-profit charity named for Ennis Cosby. Ennis, Cosby's only son, was murdered in January 1997.
- The character of Dr. Hibbert, who is featured on the long-running animated sitcom The Simpsons, is modeled after Dr. Cliff Huxtable. The Simpsons writing staff decided to make Dr. Hibbert a parody of Cliff Huxtable after the Fox network moved The Simpsons to Thursday nights airing opposite the top-rated The Cosby Show.
- In the Teen Titans Go! episode "Oil Drums", Starfire says "I would like to watch The Crosby Pudding Half-Hour Show of Sweaters. Theo, get your glorp-nops off the kitchen table. Rudy!"

== Home media ==
All eight seasons of The Cosby Show have been released on DVD in Region 1. Seasons one and two were released by UrbanWorks which was subsequently acquired by First Look Studios, who then released the remaining six seasons. Seasons One and Two contain special features, including the ninety minute retrospective documentary entitled The Cosby Show: A Look Back, which aired on NBC in May 2002.

It contains interviews with cast members, bloopers, deleted scenes and audition footage. In December 2010, First Look Studios filed bankruptcy, and all its assets were subsequently acquired by Millennium Entertainment, who also took over distribution of The Cosby Show DVD releases. As of 2013, these releases have been discontinued, and are now out of print.

In 2013, Mill Creek Entertainment acquired the rights to the series. They subsequently re-released all eight seasons on DVD. On September 1, 2015, Mill Creek released a sixteen disc complete series set entitled The Cosby Show – The Complete Series.

In Region 4, Magna Pacific has released all eight seasons on DVD in Australia and New Zealand. The first two seasons have similar artwork to the North American copies, although season two is red rather than blue. Each Australian cover also features the tagline "In a house full of love, there is always room for more".

Universal Studios Home Entertainment has released Seasons 1 to 4 in Region 2 (United Kingdom).

DVD title	Ep #	Release dates		
DVD title	Ep #	Region 1	Region 2	Region 4
Season 1	24	August 2, 2005; January 21, 2014 (re release)	May 19, 2008	October 4, 2006
Season 2	25	March 7, 2006; January 21, 2014 (re release)	August 25, 2008	February 7, 2007
Season 3	25	June 5, 2007; April 15, 2014 (re release)	October 13, 2008	April 4, 2007
Season 4	24	June 5, 2007; April 15, 2014 (re release)	February 9, 2009	November 7, 2007
Season 5	26	November 6, 2007; January 6, 2015 (re release)		March 5, 2008
Season 6	26	November 6, 2007; January 6, 2015 (re release)		July 9, 2008
Season 7	26	April 8, 2008; June 16, 2015 (re release)		January 13, 2010
Season 8	25	April 8, 2008; June 16, 2015 (re release)		January 13, 2010
25th Anniversary; Commemorative Edition	201	November 11, 2008; September 1, 2015 (re release)		
Collector's Edition	201			August 6, 2014

Note: The Millennium Entertainment release of season one contains the edited versions of the episodes aired in syndication. However, all subsequent DVD releases (including the complete series set) contain the original, uncut broadcast versions. In 2011, Millennium quietly released season one uncut in Region 1, which featured the special features from The Complete Series set.
