= Sabrina Le Beauf =

American actress

- Born: Sabrina Marie Le Beauf; March 21, 1958 (age 68); New Orleans, Louisiana, U.S.
- Education: University of California, Los Angeles (BA); Yale University (MFA)
- Occupation: Actress
- Years active: 1984–present
- Known for: Sondra Huxtable in The Cosby Show; Norma Bindlebeep in Fatherhood
- Spouse: Michael Reynolds (m. 1987; div. 1997)

Sabrina Marie Le Beauf (born March 21, 1958) is an American actress best known for her portrayal of Sondra Huxtable on the NBC sitcom The Cosby Show. She has voiced the character Norma Bindlebeep on the Nick at Nite animated series Fatherhood, a show based on Bill Cosby's book of the same name.

== Early life ==
Sabrina was born on March 21, 1958, in New Orleans, Louisiana. Eager to leave the strictly segregated lifestyle of 1950s Louisiana behind, her family moved to Los Angeles, California soon after her birth. Her parents divorced, and Sabrina lived with her maternal grandmother, Sce Ethel Holmes, in south central LA until her mother's remarriage. When Sabrina was 10 years old, she returned to live with her mother and stepfather in Inglewood, California. Acting interested her from a young age, and she performed in many school plays, starring as Cinderella in elementary school. Sabrina also took on leadership roles, including high school class president at St. Matthias Catholic Girls High School and a Girls' State delegate.

After high school Sabrina attended UCLA, earning her undergraduate degree in theater. During her time at UCLA she became frustrated by the lack of parts offered to African American students, and in response formed a Black students' theater group to allow them to put on their own shows. In September 1980, she began graduate work at the Yale School of Drama, where she earned her master's degree in acting.

== Career ==
In 1984, Le Beauf auditioned for the role of the eldest Huxtable daughter Sondra on The Cosby Show. Aged 26 at the time of her audition, she was initially considered too old to play one of the children, being only 10 years younger than Phylicia Rashad, the actress who played her mother, Clair Huxtable. Pop singer Whitney Houston also auditioned for the same part, but refused to sign the contract as she also wanted to become a singer. Houston's refusal to sign the contract which would bind her to the show and put a singing career on the back burner forced the producers to give the role to Le Beauf. Sabrina went on to play Sondra Huxtable for all eight seasons of The Cosby Show, from 1984 through the series' end in 1992. Sondra, a Princeton graduate who went on to marry and start a family of her own, was a popular character on the show; in 1988, 50 million viewers tuned in to watch Sondra give birth to twins, named Winnie and Nelson in honor of Nelson and Winnie Mandela.

During her time on The Cosby Show, Le Beauf also appeared in the series Hotel and the TV movie Howard Beach: Making a Case for Murder. She also had brief appearances as bridge officer Ensign Giusti on two episodes of Star Trek: The Next Generation and on the comedy The Sinbad Show.

Le Beauf also continued her work in the theater, performing in several productions of the Shakespeare Theatre Company in Washington, D.C., including Katherine in The Taming of the Shrew, Rosaline in Love's Labour's Lost, Beatrice in Much Ado About Nothing, Helena in All's Well That Ends Well, Cordelia in King Lear and Rosalind in As You Like It. Le Beauf also appeared in the off-Broadway play Love, Loss and What I Wore that ran from 2009 to 2012.

== Personal life ==
While performing at the Folger Theater in Washington, Le Beauf met businessman and producer Michael Reynolds in 1987. They married less than one month later, settling in New York. They remained married for over ten years but filed for divorce in 1997, which Le Beauf described as "a mutual decision."

== Filmography ==
Year	Title	Role	Notes
1984–92	The Cosby Show	Sondra Huxtable	Main Cast
1986	Hotel	Kate Miller	Episode: "Shadow Play"
1989	Howard Beach: Making A Case For Murder	Maresha Fisher	Television film
1990	CBS Schoolbreak Special	Holly	Episode: "Flour Babies"
1993	Star Trek: The Next Generation	Ensign Giusti	Episodes: "Gambit, Parts I & II"
1994	The Sinbad Show	Alesha	Episode: "Black History Month"
1999	Cosby	Gonreil	Episode: "Will Power"
2004–05	Fatherhood	Norma Bindlebeep (voice)	26 episodes
2009	The Stalker Within	Leila	

== Awards and nominations ==
- Young Artist Awards 1989: Best Young Actor/Actress Ensemble in a Television Comedy, Drama Series or Special The Cosby Show
