= List of The Cosby Show episodes =

The Cosby Show is an American television sitcom created by (along with Ed. Weinberger and Michael J. Leeson) and starring Bill Cosby that originally aired on NBC from September 20, 1984 to April 30, 1992. A total of 201 original episodes and one best-moments special were produced, spanning eight seasons.

== Series overview ==
Season	Episodes	Originally released		HH rating rank	Avg. HH rating	Avg. viewers (millions)
Season	Episodes	First released	Last released	HH rating rank	Avg. HH rating	Avg. viewers (millions)
1	24	September 20, 1984	May 9, 1985	3	24.2	20.54
2	25	September 26, 1985	May 15, 1986	1	33.7	28.94
3	25	September 25, 1986	May 7, 1987	1	34.9	30.50
4	24	September 24, 1987	April 28, 1988	1	27.8	—N/a
5	26	October 6, 1988	May 11, 1989	1	25.6	40.3
6	26 (+ special)	September 21, 1989	May 3, 1990	1 (tied with Roseanne)	23.1	36.6
7	26	September 20, 1990	May 2, 1991	5	17.1	26.7
8	25	September 19, 1991	April 30, 1992	18	15.0	24.2

== Episodes ==
=== Season 1 (1984–1985) ===
The opening credits show the Huxtable family arriving at Central Park and playing various sports there, in a series of still images. The show's theme song, titled "Kiss Me", was composed by Stu Gardner and Bill Cosby. Two different versions of the theme song were used in this season: a longer version in the pilot and one other episode, and a shorter version with a slightly different arrangement for the rest of the episodes.

The pilot was recorded in May 1984. Regular production began in July 1984, with the episode "Goodbye Mr. Fish" (#0102), which was recorded during the first week of August.

Sabrina LeBeauf appeared as Sondra Huxtable in only four episodes: the 10th, 19th, 21st, and 24th of the season.

No. overall	No. in season	Title	Directed by	Written by	Original release date	Prod. code	Rating/share (households)
1	1	"Pilot" "Theo's Economic Lesson"	Jay Sandrich	Ed. Weinberger and Michael Leeson	September 20, 1984	0101	21.6/39
Clair (Phylicia Rashad) is furious when Theo (Malcolm-Jamal Warner) brings home a report card with four D's. He tells Cliff (Bill Cosby) that he has no intention of going to college, as he feels that he is destined to be a "regular person." Cliff uses Monopoly money to teach him about the economic realities that many blue-collar workers must face. He assures Theo that he only wants him to try his best. Cliff is alarmed to meet Denise's (Lisa Bonet) latest beau, a former merchant marine who once spent time in a Turkish prison. Note: In 1996, TV Guide included this episode as part of its "100 Most Memorable Moments in TV History", ranking it No. 31.
2	2	"Goodbye Mr. Fish"	Jay Sandrich	Earl Pomerantz	September 27, 1984	0102	22.5/37
When Rudy's (Keshia Knight Pulliam) pet goldfish Lamont dies, Cliff tries to bring the family together for a funeral in the bathroom. The ceremony ends when Rudy gets bored and leaves to watch TV. Note: In 2009, TV Guide ranked this episode #15 on its list of the 100 Greatest Episodes.
3	3	"Bad Dreams"	Jay Sandrich	John Markus	October 4, 1984	0103	21.9/36
Vanessa (Tempestt Bledsoe) claims that she is old enough to watch a scary movie, but Cliff still forbids it. Vanessa sneaks out anyway, and ends up having nightmares as a result.
4	4	"Is That My Boy?"	Jay Sandrich	John Markus	October 11, 1984	0105	20.6/33
Freshman Theo tries out for the football team and makes it. Cliff is overjoyed, but his pride falters when he discovers his son will never be a star. Theo, however, is just happy being on the team.
5	5	"A Shirt Story"	Jay Sandrich	John Markus	October 18, 1984	0108	21.3/34
Theo wants to impress a girl by wearing an expensive shirt by designer Gordon Gartrelle. Since Cliff and Clair will not pay for it, Denise offers to make a copy of the shirt for him. Notes: Guest appearance by Kadeem Hardison, who years later would portray Dwayne Wayne on the Cosby Show spinoff, A Different World. The name Gordon Gartrelle was taken from a staff member who eventually became a writer/producer during seasons 7 and 8.
6	6	"Breaking With Tradition"	Jay Sandrich	Earl Pomerantz	October 25, 1984	0106	21.2/33
Cliff's father, Russell (Earle Hyman), pays a visit and begins questioning Cliff about the kids' college choices. He asks Denise about Hillman, his and Cliff's alma mater. Denise is dead set against it at first, until Russell tells her that males outnumber females there. Note: Russell mentions that the only reason Cliff attended Hillman was because Clair went there, but in a later episode from the fourth season, Clair tells Vanessa and Rudy that Cliff was at Hillman while she was in high school. This is also the first appearance of Earle Hyman as Russell Huxtable.
7	7	"One More Time"	Jay Sandrich	Earl Pomerantz	November 1, 1984	0107	20.0/31
While Clair cares for a friend's baby, she begins to consider having another. Cliff desperately tries to talk her out of it, claiming that babies are "false advertising." Clair's mother, Carrie Hanks (Ethel Ayler), then reminds her that the older you are when you have kids, the older you'll be if they end up having to come back and live at home. Note: This is the first appearance of Ethel Ayler as Clair's mother Carrie.
8	8	"Play It Again, Vanessa"	Jay Sandrich	Jerry Ross	November 8, 1984	0109	21.2/32
Vanessa plays the clarinet in the school's orchestra. Though she tries her best and practices daily, she simply cannot play the instrument. She plays an embarrassing solo at the school concert, but her parents support her anyway. Guest star: Dizzy Gillespie
9	9	"How Ugly Is He?"	Jay Sandrich	John Markus	November 15, 1984	0110	22.5/36
Denise has a new boyfriend, David James, but is reluctant to bring him home. She fears that Cliff will, as always, make fun of the boy and ruin her chances with him. Cliff and Clair are initially impressed with David until he expresses some unwanted opinions about medicine and the law at dinner. Guest stars: Kristoff St. John as David James, Jossie de Guzman as Mrs. Ramos
10	10	"Bonjour, Sondra"	Jay Sandrich	Jerry Ross & Michael Loman	November 22, 1984	0111	16.7/32
Sondra (Sabrina LeBeauf), the eldest Huxtable child, makes her first appearance when she comes home for Thanksgiving. She plans on spending the summer in Paris with her girlfriends and hopes that her parents will support her decision. Note: This is the first appearance of Sabrina LeBeauf in the role of Sondra Huxtable. Her existence contradicts information given in the pilot episode that Clair and Cliff have four children.
11	11	"Knight to Night" "You're Not a Mother Night"	Jay Sandrich	Karyl Geld Miller & Korby Siamis	December 6, 1984	0104	23.1/34
Clair is exhausted from constantly caring for the children. Cliff decides to take her out on the town for "You're Not a Mother Night". They go to a fancy restaurant and hotel. While there, some of Clair's motherly instincts start kicking in but they stop in time for a romantic evening.
12	12	"Rudy's Sick"	Jay Sandrich	Matt Williams	December 13, 1984	0113	21.3/34
Clair could be named a partner at her law firm if an interview goes well, but Rudy is sick. Cliff vows to take care of the child while Clair works, and engages in some unique doctoring methods. In the end, Rudy is fine and Clair becomes a partner.
13	13	"Father's Day"	Jay Sandrich	John Markus & Elliot Shoenman	December 20, 1984	0112	21.7/35
Cliff complains about the poor quality of his annual Father's Day gifts. He challenges the children to find some better presents for a December Father's Day. They give him thoughtful, if not quite attractive, presents.
14	14	"Independence Day"	Jay Sandrich	Matt Robinson	January 10, 1985	0114	25.4/34
While spending the weekend at his friend Cockroach's house, Theo pays Cockroach's younger sister, Tootsie, 99¢ to pierce his ear in order to impress a girl at school. After Denise warns him that it might be infected, he goes to Cliff for treatment. Cliff hopes that Grandpa Huxtable will lecture Theo when he and Cliff's mother, Anna (Clarice Taylor), come over for dinner, but he instead tells the story of how Cliff tried to conk his hair when he was 15 in order to impress Clair, but ended up burning it off. Then Anna reminds Russell of the time that he got her name tattooed across his chest as a teenager, but ended up with a large scar when he tried to remove it upon realizing that the tattoo artist had accidentally written another girl's name. Note: This episode marks the first appearance of Clarice Taylor as Anna Huxtable.
15	15	"Physician of the Year"	Jay Sandrich	John Markus	January 17, 1985	0115	27.9/40
Cliff is set to receive the prestigious "Physician of the Year" award from the hospital where he works, but he ends up missing the ceremony when one of his patients, Mrs. Randall, goes into labor right before the ceremony, so Theo accepts Cliff's award and gives his acceptance speech on his behalf. Guest stars: Sheldon Leonard as Cliff's boss, Aleta Mitchell as Mrs. Randall, Elisa de la Roche as Nurse
16	16	"Jitterbug Break"	Jay Sandrich	Matt Williams	January 31, 1985	0116	27.8/39
Cliff tries to impress Denise's friends by teaching them how to jitterbug. Some of Clair's friends also show off their dance moves. Soon, the house is full of dancers. Guest stars: Blair Underwood as Denise's boyfriend (uncredited), Judith Jamison as Marie, Donald McKayle as Ralph, Gerard Cooper as Guy, Christine Langner as Girl
17	17	"Theo and the Joint"	Jay Sandrich	John Markus	February 7, 1985	0117	26.1/37
Clair discovers a marijuana joint in one of Theo's school books. She and Cliff confront him about it and accept his explanation that another boy slipped it into his book without his knowledge. Theo confronts the boy and brings him home to confess in order to remove any doubt about whether he was telling the truth. Theo and the boy start to become friends. Guest star: Iman as Mrs. Montgomery, one of Cliff's patients
18	18	"Vanessa's New Class"	Jay Sandrich	Matt Williams & Carmen Finestra	February 14, 1985	0118	26.6/40
Vanessa is placed in an advanced science class. She creates a model of the Solar System, but learns that she will have to work harder than ever if she hopes to succeed. Guest stars: William Christian as Mr. Robertson; the first appearance of Pam Potillo as Vanessa's friend Janet Meiser
19	19	"Clair's Case"	Jay Sandrich	Winifred Hervey	February 21, 1985	0119	25.1/36
A mechanic tries to cheat Sondra, prompting Clair to confront him. Cliff and Clair also pretend to hit on each other in court. Guest stars: Shawn Elliott as Mr. Wilson, Alan North as Judge and David Langston Smyrl as the man in court - his first of three different characters he portrayed on the show. Note: This is the only episode where Clair Huxtable is seen in a courtroom.
20	20	"Back to the Track, Jack"	Jay Sandrich	Matt Robinson	February 28, 1985	0120	27.0/41
Cliff's college track coach contacts him and asks him to compete in a masters relay race rematch between Hillman College and its rival, Norton University. "Combustible Huxtable" begins training, but soon learns that he is not the runner he was all those years ago. Guest stars: Al Freeman Jr. as Coach Ernie Scott; 1956 Olympic medalist Joshua Culbreath as Colonel Sanford B. "Tailwind" Turner; Dhamiri Abayomi as himself Note: Portions of this episode were filmed at Draddy Gymnasium in the Bronx and Meadowlands Arena in New Jersey.
21	21	"The Younger Woman"	Jay Sandrich	John Markus	March 14, 1985	0121	28.3/43
Cliff and Clair receive a visit from a recently widowed friend of Cliff's and discover that he has a new girlfriend that is almost Sondra's age. They are initially suspicious, but learn that judging by appearances isn't always right. Guest stars: Terry Farrell as Nicki Phillips; Robert King as Dr. Mike Newcomb.
22	22	"The Slumber Party"	Jay Sandrich	Carmen Finestra	March 28, 1985	0122	30.1/46
Rudy invites all her friends over for a slumber party. It's Cliff job to watch over them, and he demonstrates some unique games to wrangle the youngsters. In the end, Russell drops by and demonstrates the perfect way to deal with kids — bribe them. Guest stars: First appearance of Peter Costa as Peter, the Huxtables' neighbor; Earle Hyman as Russell; Alicia Keys (billed under her given name of Alicia Cook) Note: This episode opened with a brief voiceover from Keshia Knight-Pulliam explaining that this episode was meant specifically for kids.
23	23	"Mr. Quiet"	Jay Sandrich	Emily Tracy	May 2, 1985	0124	25.5/43
The Huxtables volunteer at a local community center. When an abused boy comes to the center, director Tony Castillo does his best to help him. Guest stars: Tony Orlando as Tony Castillo, Alexis Cruz as Enrique Tarron, Ada Maris as Selena Cruz, Angela Bassett as Mrs. Mitchell, Lisa Mordente as Expectant Mother #1 and David Smyrl as Chester - his second of 3 different characters he played on the show. Notes: This episode was a backdoor pilot for a proposed spin-off series featuring Tony Orlando's character and the community center, which never came to fruition. This is the first episode in which Clair is shown to be fluent in Spanish.
24	24	"Cliff's Birthday"	Jay Sandrich	Elliot Shoenman & John Markus	May 9, 1985	0123	24.1/45
Cliff is turning 48 and, as usual, he is trying to find out what his birthday present is ahead of time. Clair, with the help of the kids, orchestrates a huge ruse that fools him. In the end, he is surprised when he receives a visit from Lena Horne. Guest star: Clarence Williams III as Clarence Thornehill

=== Season 2 (1985–1986) ===
For this season, the opening credits were changed to a series of clips of the cast dancing in a gray, featureless room. Each cast member, in descending age of their characters, dances alongside Cosby as his/her name is shown in the credits. Then as the production credits appear, Cosby is seen alone, stiffly "dancing" to the music. On the last note of the music, he quickly turns his head and looks into the camera before the image fades to black.

A new musical arrangement of the theme song was used, but it did not depart significantly from the general "jazzy" feel of the first season. As before, two different versions of the theme were used, with the longer version featuring more of a synth beat than the shorter. Midway through the season, following her marriage to NBC sportscaster Ahmad Rashad, Phylicia Ayers-Allen's name in the opening credits was changed to Phylicia Rashād. (The diacritic was dropped in season five, when her credit was changed to Phylicia Rashad.) After producer Caryn Sneider got married, her credit was also changed to use her married name, Caryn Sneider Mandabach.

Sabrina Le Beauf (as Sondra) became a regular cast member in this season, appearing in 9 of the 25 episodes.

No. overall	No. in season	Title	Directed by	Written by	Original release date	Prod. code	Rating/share (households)
25	1	"First Day of School"	Jay Sandrich	John Markus & Elliot Shoenman	September 26, 1985	0201	31.6/48
Cliff and Clair are overjoyed with the arrival of the new school year, as their children are finally out of the house.
26	2	"The Juicer"	Jay Sandrich	Matt Williams	October 3, 1985	0202	30.8/48
Cliff, who has an affinity for electric appliances, buys a juicer. Rudy and Peter, bored from Vanessa's inattentive baby-sitting, decide to use it even though they are not allowed to use appliances.
27	3	"Happy Anniversary"	Jay Sandrich	Elliot Shoenman	October 10, 1985	0203	30.7/47
For Russell and Anna's 49th wedding anniversary, the family commissions a portrait of the couple as newlyweds and offers them a cruise to Europe. Later in the evening, the whole family performs Ray Charles "Night Time Is the Right Time", with Theo, Rudy, and Cliff each lip-synching a solo. Note: In 1997, TV Guide ranked this episode number 54 on its '100 Greatest Episodes of All Time' list.
28	4	"Cliff in Love"	Jay Sandrich	John Markus	October 17, 1985	0204	31.1/49
Sondra breaks up with her boyfriend Elvin and is depressed, taking it out on the family. Cliff and Clair aren't exactly unhappy: they find him annoying. Elvin arrives with flowers and tries to apologize, but he ends up annoying Clair with more of his sexist rhetoric. Guest star: Geoffrey Owens as Elvin Tibideaux Note: This is the first appearance of Geoffrey Owens as Elvin. Joseph C. Phillips, who appears in a minor guest role as Daryl, will later (starting season 6) play Navy Lt. Martin Kendall, Denise's new husband.
29	5	"Theo and the Older Woman"	Jay Sandrich	Carmen Finestra	October 24, 1985	0205	29.0/43
When friend Suzanne accompanies Denise to observe the Huxtables' normal behavior, a smitten Theo behaves far from normally. Guest stars: Robin Givens as Suzanne and Blair Underwood as Mark Roberts
30	6	"Halloween"	Jay Sandrich	Elliot Shoenman	October 31, 1985	0206	30.1/46
Vanessa has a crush on Robert Forman, who comes to her Halloween party. Daydreaming about her love, she drops an entire tray of glasses and embarrasses herself in front of the guests. Guest stars: Akili Prince as Scott; the first appearance of Dondre Whitfield as Robert
31	7	"Denise Drives"	Jay Sandrich	Carmen Finestra	November 7, 1985	0207	31.9/46
Denise wants to buy a car. She plans to use her savings to do so, but her parents quickly point out flaws in her plan. The answer to everyone's problems comes from friend Mr. Lucas, who has an old car he is willing to sell. Denise proves herself to be a good driver, and the car is hers. Guest stars: David Langston Smyrl as Mr. Lucas, his third different character portrayed on The Cosby Show.
32	8	"Rudy Suits Up"	Jay Sandrich	Gary Kott	November 14, 1985	0208	31.7/47
Rudy plays football and becomes a star, much to the chagrin of Clair, who worries she will get hurt. But reluctance turns to excitement when Rudy is the star of her first game.
33	9	"Clair's Sister"	Jay Sandrich	Elliot Shoenman & John Markus	November 21, 1985	0209	35.3/51
Clair's sister Sarah gets engaged. Guest stars: Mario Van Peebles as Garvin; the first appearance of Joe Williams as Clair's father, Al Hanks
34	10	"Clair's Toe"	Jay Sandrich	John Markus	December 5, 1985	0211	36.2/53
While preparing to go out on a proposal anniversary dinner, Clair breaks her toe but tries not to let it upset her routine. In the end, she develops a unique piece of footwear to hide her cast.
35	11	"Denise's Friend"	Jay Sandrich	Matt Williams	December 12, 1985	0210	35.4/52
Denise asks her dad to talk to her friend, who has a medical problem. Cliff diagnoses the girl as having a mild bladder infection but learns that she was wary of telling her parents for fear she was pregnant. Cliff and Clair decide to show the kids that they can tell them anything, but the children quickly point out that their parents will just get angry. Cliff admits that anger is part of dealing with problems, but tells the children that no matter what, they will be loved. Guest star: Stacey Dash as Michelle, Denise's friend Note: This episode won the 1986 Emmy for Outstanding Directing in a Comedy Series
36	12	"Mrs. Westlake"	Jay Sandrich	Elliot Shoenman	January 2, 1986	0212	34.9/50
Theo's math teacher Mrs. Westlake (Sônia Braga) is coming to dinner. He thinks she plans to tell his parents how poorly he scored on a math test. To his surprise, Mrs. Westlake comes to dinner looking young, attractive, and even with a sense of humor. It turns out that she came with good news: she gives Theo his test, which reveals he actually got an 89. In his excitement, he inadvertently embraces her.
37	13	"The Auction"	Jay Sandrich	Gary Kott	January 9, 1986	0214	36.9/54
Clair bids on a painting by her great-uncle that her grandmother had once owned, hoping to bring it back into the Huxtable family after 30 years. Attempting to win her favor, Elvin tries to bake her a cake but fails miserably; he then gets advice from Cliff on how to pass himself off as a good cook. Guest star: Geoffrey Owens as Elvin Tibideaux, John L. Marion (then-chairman of Sotheby's) as the auctioneer. Note: The painting used in the episode is "Funeral Procession" by Ellis Wilson.
38	14	"Vanessa's Bad Grade"	Jay Sandrich	Gary Kott	January 16, 1986	0213	38.5/55
Vanessa tries to hide a poor test grade from her parents, then gets into a fight with Denise after borrowing a sweater from her without asking. In the end, Rudy's choice of television viewing, Martin Luther King's "I Have A Dream" speech, reminds the whole family of what a real problem is. Note: This episode originally aired four days before the first observance of Martin Luther King Jr. Day as a U.S. federal holiday.
39	15	"Theo and Cockroach"	Jay Sandrich	Thad Mumford	January 30, 1986	0215	36.0/51
Theo and his friend Cockroach scheme to pass a test on Shakespeare's Macbeth, which neither one has read. They instead rent a recording of the play, which comes with its own consequences. Their savior comes in the form of "Cleveland Notes" (a reference to CliffsNotes). Notes: Phylicia Ayers-Allen changes her professional name to Phylicia Rashād, after marrying NBC sportscaster Ahmad Rashad. This is the first appearance of Carl Anthony Payne II as Cockroach. Earle Hyman (uncredited) provides one of the voices on the Macbeth record.
40	16	"The Dentist"	Jay Sandrich	Elliot Shoenman	February 2, 1986	0216	27.6/40
Peter goes to the dentist and has Rudy come along for moral support, so he won't be afraid. Guest star: Danny Kaye, making his final appearance in a television series Note: This was a special Sunday telecast, instead of the usual Thursday timeslot, to lead into NBC's initial airing of the Peter the Great mini-series.
41	17	"Play It Again, Russell"	Jay Sandrich	John Markus	February 13, 1986	0217	35.2/50
Russell has a crisis of confidence when the jazz band he played in before retirement reunites to honor a deceased friend. Guest appearances: jazz musicians Tito Puente, Art Blakey, Percy Heath, Jimmy Heath, Tommy Flanagan, Eric Gale, Joe Wilder, Carlos "Patato" Valdes, Bootsie Barnes, and Jimmy Oliver. Slide Hampton provided the audio track for Russell's trombone solos.
42	18	"A Touch of Wonder"	Jay Sandrich	Matt Williams	February 20, 1986	0218	36.4/53
Stevie Wonder invites the Huxtables to a recording session after his limo collides with Denise's car. Wonder performs "I Just Called to Say I Love You" with Clair and the family.
43	19	"Full House"	Jay Sandrich	Gary Kott	February 27, 1986	0219	39.0/56
After an exhausting midnight shift at the hospital and a night's sleep, all Cliff wants is to read his paper in peace. However, the children have taken over every room in the house. Guest star: Geoffrey Owens as Elvin Tibideaux
44	20	"Close to Home"	Jay Sandrich	Carmen Finestra	March 13, 1986	0220	34.8/52
A close friend of Cliff's, played by Samuel E. Wright, is overcome with sadness due to his daughter's recurring drug addiction. His feelings are set off as he observes the close relationship between Cliff, Clair and Denise, who is his daughter's age.
46	21	"An Early Spring"	Jay Sandrich	John Markus & Carmen Finestra & Matt Williams	March 20, 1986	0222	36.4/54
Theo's math teacher has a baby. Cockroach shows a different side of himself. Guest star: Carl Anthony Payne II
45	22	"Theo's Holiday"	Jay Sandrich	Matt Williams	April 3, 1986	0221	34.3/52
After Theo claims that he will have no problem making it in the "real world", the Huxtables convert their house to the "Real World Apartments" to teach him a lesson. Guest star: Carl Anthony Payne II
47	23	"The Card Game"	Jay Sandrich	Matt Robinson	April 10, 1986	0224	34.6/53
Cliff plays pinochle with his father, one of his former teachers, and a friend. Theo buys a cheap ring for his girlfriend, Tanya. Guest star: Roscoe Lee Browne as Dr. Foster.
48	24	"Off to the Races"	Jay Sandrich	Matt Williams	May 8, 1986	0225	28.3/49
Cliff participates in a charity track race at the Penn Relays with Colonel Sanford B. "Tailwind" Turner, his college track rival from Norton University, only to be upstaged during the race by a surprise participant. Special guest star: Valerie Brisco-Hooks, Joshua Culbreath as Colonel Sanford B. "Tailwind" Turner", and Camille Cosby, Bill Cosby's wife (uncredited) Note: Portions of this episode were filmed at the Penn Relays.
49	25	"Denise's Decision"	Jay Sandrich	Matt Robinson	May 15, 1986	0223	31.8/54
After much deliberation, Denise chooses the college that she will attend in the fall.

=== Season 3 (1986–1987) ===
This season's opening credits featured the cast dancing to Latin jazz in a bluish gray room. As in the previous season, Cosby dances alone as the production credits appear and quickly turns his head to look into the camera on the final musical note. Again, two versions of the sequence were used, however, unlike in previous seasons, the long and short versions differed only in their editing, not in the sound of the music.

Phylicia Rashad was pregnant throughout much of this season, so the crew hid her stomach for most of the season using such devices as kitchen counters or bed covers. She did not appear in the 13th and 14th episodes of the season.

Despite continuing to be credited as series regulars, Sabrina Le Beauf (Sondra) did not appear in 17 of the season's 25 episodes and Lisa Bonet (Denise) in 14 of the episodes.

No. overall	No. in season	Title	Directed by	Written by	Original release date	Prod. code	Rating/share (households)
50	1	"Bring 'Em Back Alive"	Jay Sandrich	Matt Williams	September 25, 1986	0302	33.5/53
The Huxtable house is thrown into chaos after Rudy finds a snake in the basement.
51	2	"Food for Thought"	Jay Sandrich	John Markus	October 2, 1986	0301	35.5/55
Clair challenges Cliff to not eat any salty food for the day. Denise leaves for her freshman year at Hillman College.
52	3	"Golden Anniversary"	Jay Sandrich	Carmen Finestra	October 9, 1986	0303	33.9/52
It is Russell and Anna's 50th wedding anniversary, so the Huxtables perform a lipsync routine to James Brown's "I Got the Feelin'" for their post-anniversary dinner. Guest star: Geoffrey Owens as Elvin Tibideaux, Frank Foster and the Count Basie Orchestra
53	4	"Man Talk"	Jay Sandrich	John Markus	October 16, 1986	0305	36.7/57
Although he has a steady girlfriend, Theo wants to start dating someone else.
54	5	"Mother, May I?"	Jay Sandrich	Susan Fales	October 23, 1986	0304	35.4/54
Saving face takes on a whole new meaning for Vanessa, when she's torn between honoring Clair (who opposes the girl's experimenting with makeup at such an early age) and pleasing her classmates (none of whose families, it seems, have any problem with such issues). Meanwhile, Theo organizes a home fire-drill which results in a worse disaster than any fire.
55	6	"The March"	Tony Singletary	Gary Kott	October 30, 1986	0306	34.9/52
Theo writes a report on the March on Washington, but he gets a poor grade and is asked to rewrite it. Much to his surprise, he learns more about the march from his family than he did from books. Meanwhile, Vanessa is worried about asking a boy to her school's turnabout dance. Note: This is the first episode in the series not to be directed by Jay Sandrich.
56	7	"Theo's Flight"	Tony Singletary	Gary Kott	November 6, 1986	0307	36.8/53
Theo and Cockroach decide they want to learn to fly, but Cliff doesn't want to waste his money on another one of Theo's foolish dreams. Meanwhile, Rudy brings home her new friend, Kenny, aka "Bud". Note: This is the first appearance of Deon Richmond as Kenny ("Bud").
57	8	"Vanessa's Rich"	Tony Singletary	Margaret Beddow Hatch	November 13, 1986	0308	35.6/50
Vanessa invites the captains of her school's pep squad to her house, but after she tells them how much Clair spent to purchase Ellis Wilson's painting "Funeral Procession" (see season 2 episode "The Auction"), the girls at school begin to call Vanessa a stuck-up rich girl. Meanwhile, Rudy asks Theo to teach her how to play checkers, and Cliff pays a visit to the local electronics store just for a new remote, or so Clair thinks. Guest star: Essence Atkins
58	9	"Denise Gets a D"	Jay Sandrich	Matt Geller	November 20, 1986	0309	34.7/50
Denise's college career starts with a D, but Denise is to scared to show her parents. Clair needs to rest in bed because of a pinched nerve. Rudy portrays "the wind" in a school play. Guest star: Rosalind Cash as Dr. Hughes Note: The episode is preceded by a 30-second anti-drug public service announcement featuring Bill Cosby.
59	10	"A Girl and Her Dog"	Jay Sandrich	Chris Auer	December 4, 1986	0312	38.6/57
Rudy and Peter find a dog and attempt to take care of it without her parents knowing.
60	11	"War Stories"	Jay Sandrich	Matt Robinson	December 11, 1986	0310	36.5/55
Cliff and his father's friend play a challenging game of cards. Vanessa prepares to go to a skating party with her date Tyrone.
61	12	"Cliff in Charge"	Jay Sandrich	Matt Williams	December 18, 1986	0311	35.1/54
Cliff is left in charge when Clair leaves for 10 days.
62	13	"Monster Man Huxtable"	Jay Sandrich	Gary Kott	January 8, 1987	0313	36.6/54
Elvin helps Theo with some wrestling moves, although he and Sondra have made plans for the weekend. Elvin reveals that he is thinking of marrying Sondra. Guest star: Geoffrey Owens as Elvin Tibideaux Note: This is the first of five episodes that Phylicia Rashad (Clair) did not appear in.
63	14	"Rudy Spends the Night"	Jay Sandrich	Carmen Finestra	January 15, 1987	0314	38.6/55
Cliff establishes the Huxtable Men's Club when the women are away to help Theo get over his sadness of a lost date. Vanessa is excited when Denise invites her to hang out with some of her college friends in Greenwich Village. Note: This is the second of five episodes that Phylicia Rashad (Clair) did not appear in.
64	15	"Say Hello to a Good Buy"	Tony Singletary	John Markus & Carmen Finestra & Matt Williams	January 22, 1987	0315	41.3/56
Cliff buys a new car. Rudy cuts some animal pictures out of Cliff's expensive books for school. Guest stars: Gilbert Gottfried and Sinbad Note: Watched by almost 65 million viewers when it originally aired, it is the highest-rated episode of the series.
65	16	"Denise Gets an Opinion"	Tony Singletary	Gary Kott	February 5, 1987	0316	37.6/54
Denise has a blind date, but she's scared, so she asks Theo to check him out first.
66	17	"Calling Doctor Huxtable"	Jay Sandrich	Chris Auer	February 12, 1987	0317	38.2/57
Cliff is called to the hospital for three simultaneous deliveries. Guest stars: Malinda Williams, Michael Vale, Lisa Vidal, Patricia Richardson, and Patricia's former husband Ray Baker.
67	18	"You Only Hurt the One You Love"	Jay Sandrich	John Markus & Carmen Finestra	February 19, 1987	0318	37.6/54
Rudy gets hurt from Theo's rough games. Rudy cries, and Theo gets punished. Clair has Cliff take Rudy to a doctor and gets the same advice that Cliff gave her. Cliff learns that the woman who cleans up the doctor's lounge at the hospital is going to be laid off and tries to help her keep her job. Guest star: Rita Moreno
68	19	"The Shower"	Jay Sandrich	Matt Williams	February 26, 1987	0319	36.9/54
Denise throws a bridal shower for her pregnant bride-to-be friend Veronica, but after the shower she discovers some shocking information about Veronica's pregnancy. Guest star: Lela Rochon
69	20	"Cliff's 50th Birthday"	Carl Lauten & Regge Life	Gary Kott	March 12, 1987	0320	36.6/54
Cliff's 50th birthday has all kinds of surprises. Guest star: Gates McFadden (credited as Cheryl McFadden)
70	21	"I Know That You Know"	Jay Sandrich	John Markus & Carmen Finestra & Matt Williams	March 19, 1987	0321	36.4/54
When Sondra and Elvin announce their engagement, Clair and the children use the news to play a practical joke on Cliff, who launches a counteroffensive of his own. Guest star: Geoffrey Owens as Elvin Tibideaux
71	22	"The Andalusian Flu"	Jay Sandrich	Janet Leahy	April 2, 1987	0322	37.9/56
While Cliff and Clair have the flu, Theo tries to keep the house going, but instead forces all the work on Vanessa and Rudy.
72	23	"Bald and Beautiful"	Tony Singletary	Gary Kott	April 9, 1987	0324	32.4/54
Cliff's Navy friend comes to visit. Cockroach shaves his head to be in a rock video. Note: Robert Culp was Bill Cosby's co-star in the 1960s TV series I Spy.
73	24	"Planning Parenthood"	Jay Sandrich	Elizabeth Hailey & Oliver Hailey	April 30, 1987	0326	31.6/53
Clair's sister decides she wants to be a mother. Cliff takes Rudy and her friends out to eat at a fancy restaurant. "Guest Star:" Pam Grier
74	25	"Hillman"	Jay Sandrich	Matt Robinson	May 7, 1987	0325	26.4/47
The Huxtable family goes to Hillman College to attend a ceremony in honor of its president's retirement. Guest stars: Joe Seneca and Gloria Foster Note: Filmed at Spelman College in Atlanta. The episode serves as a backdoor pilot for the spinoff series A Different World, which premiered next season.

=== Season 4 (1987–1988) ===
This season's opening sequence features the cast dancing to a vocal jazz rendition of the theme performed by Bobby McFerrin. Bill Cosby is seen at the end of the credits dancing to the music as the producer credits appear and at the end, he quickly turns his head, takes off his top hat, and looks into the camera. Unlike the first three seasons, the opening credits featured the cast wearing formal 1930s-style clothing. Cosby wears a top hat and tails, Tempestt Bledsoe an outfit styled after a WAVES uniform, and Malcolm-Jamal Warner a business suit. Geoffrey Owens (Elvin) is introduced to the regular cast by Cosby leading him into Sabrina LeBeauf's shot (neither Owens nor LeBeauf appeared in the majority of episodes in this season). Before the producer credits, Cosby briefly holds a picture of Lisa Bonet. Bonet did not appear as main cast this season, having departed for the spinoff series, A Different World; instead, she made two guest appearances.

No. overall	No. in season	Title	Directed by	Written by	Original release date	Prod. code	Rating/share (households)
75	1	"Call of the Wild"	Jay Sandrich	Gary Kott	September 24, 1987	0402	31.5/51
Newlyweds Sondra and Elvin return from their honeymoon with shocking news for Cliff and Clair: instead of going on to law and medical school, they plan to open a wilderness supply store.
76	2	"Theogate"	Jay Sandrich	John Markus	October 1, 1987	0401	29.8/49
Theo and Cockroach come home unusually late from a track meet, and they both deny anything out of the ordinary happened. Theo continuously lies about what happened, especially after a call from his principal comes while he's not home. A suspicious Clair, attorney at law, holds a mock trial against Theo and Cockroach in order to get to the bottom of what happened. Note: Bill Cosby and Keshia Knight Pulliam appeared on the episode of A Different World that aired later that evening.
77	3	"It Ain't Easy Being Green"	Carl Lauten & Regge Life	John Markus & Carmen Finestra	October 8, 1987	0408	28.2/45
Rudy wants to wear summer clothes in winter to a party, while Cliff tries to get rid of an old water heater.
78	4	"Cliff's Mistake"	Carl Lauten & Regge Life	Janet Leahy	October 15, 1987	0405	30.0/49
While setting up the house as a "haunted house" for Halloween, Cliff discovers he lost a power drill that his neighbor loaned for him. Note: This is the first appearance of Wallace Shawn as Jeffrey Engels.
79	5	"Shakespeare"	Jay Sandrich	Matt Robinson	October 22, 1987	0323	24.2/36
Theo must read Julius Caesar for school but complains that it is boring. Russell and his friends read scenes from the play aloud, and Theo is enthralled. Later, the men read from a story that Rudy wrote. Guest stars: Lisa Bonet as Denise Huxtable, Christopher Plummer, Roscoe Lee Browne Note: This is a leftover season-three episode.
80	6	"That's Not What I Said"	Jay Sandrich	Carmen Finestra	October 29, 1987	0403	31.1/47
Cliff and Clair have a marital argument after Theo gets detained by police for riding in a car with an unlicensed driver.
81	7	"Autumn Gifts"	Carl Lauten & Regge Life	Matt Williams	November 5, 1987	0404	31.4/48
Rudy goes to an older widowed lady's house each afternoon to have tea and play cards, but notices that she refuses to take her daily medication for diabetes. She tells Cliff, who devises a plan to try to convince her that she needs meds to live. Guest Star: Eileen Heckart Note: Bill Cosby and Keshia Knight Pulliam appeared on the episode of A Different World that aired later that evening.
82	8	"Looking Back"	Jay Sandrich	John Markus & Carmen Finestra & Gary Kott	November 12, 1987	0413	33.9/51
83	9	"Looking Back"	Jay Sandrich	John Markus & Carmen Finestra & Gary Kott	November 12, 1987	0413	33.9/51
Sondra and Elvin have their first marital fight, and Elvin comes to the Huxtable house for comfort and support. Clair shares about the difficulties in their house as flashbacks are shown.
84	10	"Where's Rudy?"	Tony Singletary	Gary Kott	November 19, 1987	0409	31.0/47
Theo and Vanessa lose track of Rudy in a mall while Clair enters a squash exhibition. Guest stars: Louis Nye as a rival entrant Note: Earle Hyman (Russell) appeared on the episode of A Different World that aired later that evening.
85	11	"Dance Mania"	Tony Singletary	Matt Williams	December 3, 1987	0410	24.9/38
Theo and Cockroach have tickets to appear on television on the dance show "Dance Mania", but are told that only one of them can enter the studio during the filming because of fire laws. Theo miscalculates by offering to let Cockroach go in (thinking he'll refuse) and gets angry when Cockroach takes him up on the offer. Note: This is the first appearances of Troy Winbush as Denny and Adam Sandler as Smitty, and the final appearance of Carl Anthony Payne II as Cockroach. Bill Cosby appeared on the episode of A Different World that aired later that evening.
86	12	"The Locker Room"	Jay Sandrich	Janet Leahy	December 10, 1987	0406	30.0/47
Theo and his classmates brag about their dates with girls in the locker room, but Theo's mood changes when one of the guys goes out with Vanessa and brags about it the next day.
87	13	"The Show Must Go On"	Jay Sandrich	John Markus & Carmen Finestra & Gary Kott	December 17, 1987	0414	29.3/46
Cliff takes Rudy and her friends to see a vaudeville show, but they are less than impressed. Guest stars: Bill Irwin, vaudeville performer Carl Ballantine ("The Great Ballantine"), and Cosby Show writer Carmen Finestra portrays stand-up comedian Andy Witherspoon.
88	14	"Bookworm"	Jay Sandrich	Janet Leahy	January 7, 1988	0411	32.8/47
Clair drags Cliff to her book club meeting, and he's the lone male there. Much to Clair's surprise, Cliff knows quite a bit about the book in question. Meanwhile, the kids attempt a sleepover at Sondra and Elvin's run-down studio apartment but are overwhelmed by the noise and lack of utilities. Guest stars: Angela Bassett and S. Epatha Merkerson
89	15	"Twinkle, Twinkle Little Star"	Carl Lauten & Chuck Vinson	Story by : Chris Auer and John Markus & Carmen Finestra & Gary Kott; Teleplay by : John Markus & Carmen Finestra & Gary Kott	January 14, 1988	0407	31.7/47
Rudy has to play the violin in music class at school but gets jealous because she thinks her classmates' instruments are more fun. Guest star: Melba Moore
90	16	"The Visit"	Regge Life	John Markus & Carmen Finestra & Gary Kott	January 21, 1988	0416	30.9/45
When he visits a friend who's been hospitalized with cancer, Theo discovers that being sick doesn't change who people are. Guest Star: Christopher Collet
91	17	"The Drum Major"	Regge Life	Matt Robinson	February 4, 1988	0412	32.3/47
Vanessa tries out for drum major at school. Theo playfully mocks her efforts, but learns from friends that Vanessa is the target of sexism and intervenes on her behalf. Meanwhile, Cliff cooks up a batch of extremely spicy chili as Russell tries to pay off a loan from an old friend. Guest Star: Dub Taylor
92	18	"Waterworks"	Tony Singletary	Janet Leahy	February 11, 1988	0417	30.1/45
To stop Cliff from trying to fix a leaky pipe and tearing up the bathroom, Clair hires a team of plumbers who are friends of Sondra and Elvin from Princeton.
93	19	"Once Upon a Time"	Tony Singletary	John Markus & Carmen Finestra & Gary Kott	February 18, 1988	0415	23.6/35
Rudy writes a fairy tale, and the colorful story is acted out in her fantasy. Members of the family play the roles of a village full of happy people and a mean group that ruins their fun. At the end of the episode, Rudy declares that when she becomes "president of the world", she will put a stop to all mean people. Cliff and Clair proceed to watch news reports of weapons' testing and bombings, and urge her to "hurry, because we need you right now." Guest star: Lisa Bonet as Denise Huxtable
94	20	"Pétanque"	Regge Life	Matt Williams	February 25, 1988	0418	24.8/37
Cliff and a friend play pétanque. Note: This is the first appearance of Sullivan Walker as Dr. James Harmon.
95	21	"Trust Me"	Jay Sandrich	John Markus & Carmen Finestra & Gary Kott	March 3, 1988	0420	31.4/48
A friend of Clair's has marital problems; Cliff takes a "mini vacation" in the house as Theo, Rudy, and Vanessa try to stamp each other with riddles. Guest stars: Meg Foster as Dyan and Joe Fabiani as Richard
96	22	"Home for the Weekend"	Tony Singletary	John Markus & Carmen Finestra & Gary Kott	March 17, 1988	0421	28.2/43
Denise comes home from college, but seems to have more time with her friends than for the family. Guest star: Lisa Bonet as Denise Huxtable
97	23	"The Prom"	Tony Singletary	Janet Leahy	March 24, 1988	0422	28.0/45
Theo, Danny, and Smitty go to great lengths to impress their dates for the senior prom but fail disastrously; Cliff and Clair relive their own prom. Notes: This is the first appearance of Michelle Thomas as Justine. Phylicia Rashād appeared on the episode of A Different World that aired later that evening.
98	24	"Gone Fishin'"	Tony Singletary	John Markus & Carmen Finestra & Gary Kott	April 28, 1988	0419	23.2/41
When the Huxtable men go fishing, Theo catches a dead body, and soon attracts attention from the media. The success goes to his head, while Rudy and Kenny find a nest of baby birds, but the mother bird is missing. The two stories eventually cross in a surprising and rather humiliating lesson for Theo.

=== Season 5 (1988–1989) ===
The opening sequence in this season featured the cast in Caribbean-style clothing dancing on a veranda to an orchestral version of "Kiss Me" arranged by James DePreist, and performed by the Oregon Symphony Orchestra. This sequence, choreographed by Geoffrey Holder, was the only one to show the cast dancing together instead of separately; it ended with the other members fluttering their hands in front of Cosby's face and pulling them away to show him looking into the camera with a smile. The first seven episodes included a closing-theme version of this orchestration that was identical to the one used to open the show. The remaining fifteen episodes closed with a funk/jazz version of the theme.

In this season Lisa Bonet continued to guest star occasionally as Denise. Series regulars Sabrina Le Beauf and Geoffrey Owens again appeared in fewer than half of the season's episodes.

No. overall	No. in season	Title	Directed by	Written by	Original release date	Prod. code	U.S. viewers (millions)	Rating/share (households)
99	1	"Together Again and Again"	Jay Sandrich	John Markus & Carmen Finestra & Gary Kott	October 6, 1988	0501	37.6	24.2/40
With Denise returning to Hillman for her junior year and Theo moving into the dorms at NYU, Cliff and Clair's goal of zero children living at home by the year 2000 begins to look attainable. But they receive a severe setback when Denise decides to drop out of Hillman and Theo forgets to mail in his dorm check to NYU. Fearing that their nest will never be empty, a melancholy Cliff proposes that he and Clair leave the house, let the children have it and, unlike General MacArthur, never return. Guest star: Lisa Bonet as Denise Huxtable
100	2	"The Physical"	Jay Sandrich	John Markus & Carmen Finestra & Gary Kott	October 13, 1988	0502	36.5	23.1/38
Cliff follows up his "lost weekend" food binge with a day of emergency fasting for his annual blood test and physical. Despite his yeoman performance on the treadmill, the results indicate that his overindulgence in hoagies, chocolate soda and strawberry cheesecake must cease. Meanwhile, Denise is not fazed in the least by her firing from the record company. She picks herself up, dusts herself off, orders a large cheese pie – and then gets hired on as a waitress in the pizza parlor. Guest star: John Amos as Dr. Bradley Herbert, Jr. and Lisa Bonet as Denise Huxtable
101	3	"Rudy's All-Nighter"	Tony Singletary	Janet Leahy	October 20, 1988	0505	40.5	25.9/42
Theo gets a "D" on his first freshman English composition and worries that he is not "college material." When he rewrites it, using simple words to communicate his feelings rather than fancy ones to impress his professor, things improve dramatically. Rudy's friend Carolyn sleeps over, but their late-night fighting disrupts Cliff's sleep – and jeopardize his sanity. The girls soon discover that making up is not hard to do, especially when you are really sleepy.
102	4	"Move It" "The Baby Game"	Tony Singletary	John Markus & Carmen Finestra & Gary Kott	October 27, 1988	0503	41.1	26.2/43
Cliff and Clair visit Elvin and Sondra for dinner, but find life in the couple's cramped apartment sorely lacking: inedible food, unclean tap water, malfunctioning appliances, and noise and distractions from the neighbors. With their first grandchild due to be born into this environment, Cliff and Clair try to persuade Elvin and Sondra to accept some help in finding a larger, safer apartment. Guest star: Lisa Bonet as Denise Huxtable
103	5	"Out of Brooklyn"	Tony Singletary	John Markus & Carmen Finestra	November 3, 1988	0504	39.8	25.9/41
Vanessa falls victim to a rumor circulating around school that her boyfriend Roy has broken off their romance. Rudy offers her some sisterly advice. As her anxiety builds, Vanessa becomes increasingly clumsy. Meanwhile, Denise's prospective employer, a photojournalist who is preparing a book on pygmy tribes, persuades Cliff and Clair to allow Denise to accompany her to Africa. Guest star: Lisa Bonet as Denise Huxtable Note: This is Bonet's last appearance in season five and the first appearance of Elizabeth Narvaez as Kara.
104	6	"The Birth"	Tony Singletary	John Markus & Carmen Finestra & Gary Kott	November 10, 1988	0506	49.3	30.3/47
105	7	"The Birth"	Tony Singletary	John Markus & Carmen Finestra & Gary Kott	November 10, 1988	0506	49.3	30.3/47
Bedlam erupts in the Huxtable kitchen when Sondra goes into labor. In his confusion, Elvin drives off to the hospital without her. When he and Sondra drive to the hospital, Sondra is forced to drive the car. Everyone gathers in the hospital waiting room to hear the surprise news – Sondra has delivered twins! Named Winnie and Nelson. Also, Elvin will be going back to medical school. Meanwhile, on the Huxtable's residence, Theo has second thoughts about his girlfriend, Justine, when he meets Julia, the beautiful co-ed who is dating his friend Howard. When Cliff and Clair returned home, she is trying to figure out what a "Grandma" is. Also, they enjoy the Spaghetti and meatballs, cooked by Theo and Howard. Guest stars: Deon Richmond as Kenny, Michelle Thomas as Justine, Naomi Campbell as Julia, and the first appearance of Reno Wilson as Howard. Also, this is the first appearance of Dennis Scott and Marcella Lowery as Lester and Francine Tibideaux, Elvin's parents.
106	8	"Cyranoise de Bergington"	Carl Lauten & Chuck Vinson	John Markus & Gary Kott	November 17, 1988	0507	41.7	27.0/42
Theo's friend Howard breaks up with the beautiful Julia. Theo sees this as an opportunity to date her himself, even though he is already dating Justine. To make sure Julia likes him, he asks his friend Denny to put in a good word for him. Although Julia falls for Denny, Theo is not discouraged and decides to try his luck anyway. His two-timing plans fall through, however, when Justine finds out and warns Julia. Both ladies drop Theo the same day, leaving Cliff to piece together his son's shattered ego. Meanwhile, at home Rudy asks Cliff to advance her the money to buy Claire a birthday present and does chores around the house to pay off the advance.
107	9	"How Do You Get to Carnegie Hall?"	Tony Singletary	Janet Leahy	November 24, 1988	0508	31.8	17.9/35
When Vanessa and her two friends Janet and Kara make a demo video of The Loco-Motion at a local department store, visions of MTV stardom dance in their heads. Cliff and Clair tactfully suggest that some singing lessons might be in order, so the girls seek out a teacher (Betty Carter). But learning to sing is a time-consuming step that they decide to bypass in favor of selecting hip, new outfits. The Lipsticks' career is brought to a grinding halt, however, when Cliff and Clair get an eyeful of their suggestive gyrations and skimpy costumes.
108	10	"If the Dress Fits, Wear It"	Jay Sandrich	John Markus & Carmen Finestra	December 8, 1988	0509	38.0	23.8/38
Clair hopes an exercise instructor, known as "The Bonecrusher", will help her fit into her new evening gown. Clair throws herself into the workouts, but her efforts are undermined by a mischievous Cliff. It seems he is so upset that she has not told him about her plan to lose five pounds in a week that he will pull every underhanded trick in his book to "test" her willpower – including the ultimate temptation: guacamole and corn chips. Guest stars: Debbie Allen, voice-over by Ahmad Rashad (Phylicia Rashād's sister and husband, respectively)
109	11	"Is There a Hamster in the House?"	Tony Singletary	Mark St. Germain	December 15, 1988	0510	40.4	25.9/42
Cliff bends his iron rule against pets in the house when he lets Rudy "baby-sit" her friend's hamster. When the little fellow develops a bad cold, Cliff and Rudy take him to the veterinary hospital's emergency room. There they witness a wee hours parade of strange animals with even stranger maladies. Despite all efforts, the hamster dies, prompting Cliff to finally tell the truth about his anti-pet stand. It seems when he was a boy, he sat on his pet finch, Charlie. And although he did not kill him, the resultant trauma (for both boy and bird) brought Cliff's penchant for pets to a complete end.
110	12	"Truth or Consequences"	Tony Singletary	John Markus & Carmen Finestra & Gary Kott	January 5, 1989	0512	46.1	28.6/43
Vanessa's new boyfriend, Jeremy, wants to see more of her, so she sneaks out to meet him, lying to Cliff and Clair in the process. When they find out, Vanessa's grounded for a month and Jeremy is invited into the kitchen for a man to man talk with Cliff. The conversation conducted by Cliff is an ingenious one and also becomes a hilarious inquisition when Cliff uses a pair of apples, designated "Jeremy" and "Vanessa," to discern just how close the two of them were when they were parked in Jeremy's car!
111	13	"Cliff Babysits"	Tony Singletary	John Markus & Carmen Finestra & Gary Kott	January 12, 1989	0511	48.4	29.8/45
Babymania grips the Huxtable household, with Elvin videotaping every waking moment of his children's lives. It turns out that Elvin can't stop to shoot a video. When Russell shows up with eight tickets to a Michael Jackson concert, Sondra convinces the paranoid papa that it is okay to leave the twins with "strangers" like Clair and Cliff for a few hours. Clair gets called away suddenly on a case, leaving Cliff to act as sole baby-sitter. Eventually, caring for two infants takes its toll, and Clair returns to find three slumbering cherubs in the living room.
112	14	"Mrs. Huxtable Goes to Kindergarten"	Carl Lauten & Chuck Vinson	John Markus & Carmen Finestra & Gary Kott	January 26, 1989	0514	44.1	27.0/42
Clair's television career gets off to a rousing start when she is invited to be a guest panelist on a Sunday morning current events talk show. She is a big hit with the producers, but cannot stand the three insufferable chauvinists on the panel with her. Meanwhile, poor Cliff is suffering prewithdrawal pains; Clair has purchased a beautiful new sofa for the living room and his favorite old sofa and chair are to be banished from the house. In a moving finale, Cliff bids a sentimental farewell to his "old friends". Guest star: Austin Pendleton
113	15	"The Lost Weekend"	Tony Singletary	John Markus & Carmen Finestra & Gary Kott	February 2, 1989	0513	45.7	28.4/44
Cliff and Clair take a well-earned break from kids and chores, depositing Rudy at Grandma's, dropping Vanessa at a friend's house and heading for the Poconos. That leaves Theo alone in the house for the weekend. When his friends hear about it, they organize a party – which soon grows into a wild event attended by nearly 200 people, most of them strangers. Theo is left with a trashed house and facing the wrath of Cliff, who wonders why in the United States "they don't have anything where you can get rid of your kid." Note: This is the first appearance of Alex Ruiz as Lou. Cameo appearance by Joie Lee. Phylicia Rashād (Clair), Malcolm-Jamal Warner (Theo), Tempestt Bledsoe (Vanessa), and Elizabeth Narvaez (Kara) appeared on the "Risky Business" episode of A Different World which aired later that evening.
114	16	"No Way, Baby"	Tony Singletary	John Markus & Carmen Finestra & Gary Kott	February 6, 1989	0517	41.9	25.6/37
Cliff tracks down the only living relative of his unmarried patient, who is about to deliver her first child. Her grandfather, a 67-year-old former boxer named Ray Palomino is reluctant to get involved because he is afraid that his secret of being illiterate will be discovered. But thanks to an emotional delivery room meeting with his lovely granddaughter, some prodding from Cliff and a waiting room encounter with a retired English teacher who offers to coach him, the ex-fighter vows to make a "comeback". Guest stars: Sammy Davis, Jr. and Arnold Stang
115	17	"Can I Say Something, Please?"	Tony Singletary	John Markus & Carmen Finestra & Gary Kott	February 9, 1989	0516	44.2	27.1/41
Time marches on, but some things never change. Cliff rents his favorite children's movies for Rudy's party, but Rudy prefers more contemporary titles. Rudy patiently explains the facts of life, "It's a New Age. Dad – get with it!" and asks for permission to go to bed when she feels like it, instead of at 9:30. Crafty Cliff agrees, knowing full well that Rudy's enthusiasm for staying awake all night will wane in a week. She actually lasts four days, but not without first seeing (and borrowing hard-boiled dialogue from) every late night 1930s gangster movie on the tube. Guest voice-over: Ed McMahon
116	18	"The Dead End Kids Meet Dr. Lotus"	Tony Singletary	John Markus & Carmen Finestra & Gary Kott	February 16, 1989	0515	43.8	26.2/41
Theo wants the freedom to date other women, but when his girlfriend Justine shows up at the college hangout with another guy, Theo's attitude turns her off. He tries turning to a voodoo expert, Dr. Lotus, for help in removing Scott from the picture, but he cannot afford the doctor's hefty fee. When Theo asks Dad for the money, Cliff has a much better (and cheaper) idea. He applies an old (and unbelievably messy) Huxtable family concoction to Theo's hands and face that is guaranteed to get Justine back – and teach Theo a valuable lesson. Guest stars: Moses Gunn and Harold Perrineau
117	19	"The Boys of Winter"	Tony Singletary	John Markus & Carmen Finestra & Gary Kott	February 23, 1989	0519	45.0	27.2/42
Cliff proudly introduces Elvin and Theo to his former basketball coach. The boys ask the coach why Cliff is so "sour on basketball." The coach is intrigued, but Cliff will not tell him – until Clair pulls out a videotape of his last "game." This charity game at the hospital between a team of male doctors and a team of female lab technicians shows Cliff at his winded, flat-footed worst on the court and at his most underhanded and devious between whistles. Nancy Lieberman heads the women's team, while Walt Hazzard, Dave DeBusschere and Senator Bill Bradley lead the men. Also, Rudy and Vanessa admire an athletic Cliff in an old photo album and Cliff and Clair reminisce about his "glory days". Guest stars: Former NBA players Bill Bradley, Dave Debusschere, Walt Hazzard, and Wali Jones, and prominent former women's college and pro players Nancy Lieberman, Anucha Browne-Sanders, Teresa Edwards, Stephanie Givens, Rhonda Rompola, and Dana Williams.
118	20	"It Comes and It Goes"	Jay Sandrich	John Markus & Gary Kott	March 9, 1989	0518	40.9	25.3/40
Elvin comes home from med school to find an exhausted and snappish Sondra complaining about her life and his insensitivity. They bundle up the babies and head for the Huxtables, joined by Cliff and Elvin's parents, for dinner and an evening of stimulating "adult conversation." But when they arrive, baby talk, Elvin's medical school tribulations and Russell's report of Elvis having been seen in the local mall are the main subjects, leaving a morose and unhappy Sondra to wonder when (if ever) it will be "her turn" again. As a result, the elder-generation mothers and fathers welcome Sondra and Elvin to their respective clubs.
119	21	"Theo's Women"	Tony Singletary	Mark St. Germain	March 16, 1989	0520	37.7	24.2/39
When Rudy interferes with Theo and Justine's chocolate mousse-making in the kitchen, Theo complains to Cliff that they are constantly being interrupted and are never alone. Cliff suggests that Theo take Justine to a long foreign film with subtitles if he really wants to be alone with her. When they cannot find one, Justine decides to work to pick up extra money and Theo agrees to help a beautiful drama student rehearse a play. But he gets carried away during a love scene and Justine breaks off their romance. Cliff advises Theo to beg, plead and then "go to the next level" if he wants to get her back. But even Theo's howling like a dog and groveling at her feet fails to change Justine's mind. Guest star: Tichina Arnold Note: This is the first appearance of Vanessa A. Williams as Jade.
120	22	"Birthday Blues"	Jay Sandrich	Carmen Finestra & Gary Kott	March 30, 1989	0521	41.1	26.0/42
The kids launch Clair's 46th birthday with a candle in her morning grapefruit and a litany of references to how good she "still" looks. Cliff continues the assault with a description of how 50 is "right around the corner" and with a big sign that wishes her an (oops) "Happy 64th Birthday." Plácido Domingo provides one bright spot as he sings Bésame Mucho to her, but later, she must sit through an irreverent serenade from Cliff and a family "tribute" called When Mom Was My Age. The final indignity: Cliff tempts her to abandon her diet for not one but three calorie-laden whipped cream cakes. Overwhelmed at last, Clair plunges hungrily into one of the cakes – without a fork! Guest stars: Denise Nicholas
121	23	"A Room With No View"	Tony Singletary	John Markus & Gary Kott	April 13, 1989	0522	35.3	23.0/40
Cliff's enjoyment of the warm spring air and the music of birds chirping is interrupted by the sounds of Vanessa and Rudy's non-stop bickering. The slamming of their bedroom doors causes part of the kitchen ceiling to collapse, and they start fighting again once Cliff makes them clean up the mess. Finding that Vanessa and Rudy have wrecked their rooms, Cliff and Clair take the repair cost out of their allowances and send them to live in the basement. They can come upstairs to eat, use the bathroom, and watch television, but the slightest hint of bad behavior gets them exiled again. By the time repairs are completed and they are allowed to move back into their rooms, Vanessa and Rudy have begun to act civilly toward one another.
122	24	"What He Did for Love"	Carl Lauten & Chuck Vinson	John Markus & Carmen Finestra & Gary Kott	April 27, 1989	0523	31.6	21.2/39
When Theo's friend Denny finds an expensive watch on the street, Theo and the gang suggest he give it to Jade, his new high-class girlfriend, to impress her. It works like a charm until the police show up and reveal that the watch was stolen days earlier. When Jade refuses to give up this "symbol of Denny's love," the police haul her into the station for questioning. Denny is forced to admit that he found the watch and Jade dumps him so Denny, Theo and the gang find themselves dateless on Saturday night. They take refuge in the Huxtable basement, pretending to be having a good time without their women, until Cliff's rambling non-sequiturs finally drive them out into the night. Guest stars: Don Reed as Theo's friend Mitchell. Reed previously appeared as Chip St. Charles in four episodes of A Different World. Note: This is the third episode of the series in which Phylicia Rashad did not appear.
123	25	"Day of the Locusts"	Chuck Vinson	John Markus & Carmen Finestra	May 4, 1989	0524	32.4	21.7/39
When Sondra gets strep throat, Clair and Elvin's mother, Francine, remove the babies from the apartment, under the pretense of protecting them from Sondra's germs. In reality, the babies are protected because both Sondra and Elvin are wearing surgical masks, but Clair and Francine cannot resist an opportunity to have their grandchildren all to themselves. At first, Sondra's grateful. But later, high fever and Elvin's thoughtless comments about "letting our mothers take our babies" send Sondra into an escalating spiral of suspicion and revenge. When she finally tracks them down, Clair and Francine experience the full onslaught of Hurricane Sondra, much to Cliff's delight.
124	26	"57 Varieties"	Chuck Vinson	John Markus & Carmen Finestra & Gary Kott	May 11, 1989	0525	31.5	20.4/36
Theo wants to go to Egypt for an archaeological dig, so he brings the hosting professor to dinner to help convince his parents to spend $1,500. Note: This is the only episode of the fifth season to include the introductory "stinger" of the funk/jazz arrangement of "Kiss Me" that plays over the credits.

=== Season 6 (1989–1990) ===
In the opening sequence for seasons 6 and 7, the cast danced on a stage with a backdrop that displayed the marquee of the Apollo Theater in Harlem. A classical jazz arrangement of "Kiss Me," featuring Craig Handy on saxophone, was used for the theme. When the credits end, instead of looking at the camera, Cosby walks off the stage, commenting, "This is the best elevator music I've ever heard!" This line was cut out of the credits when they were used in season 7.

No. overall	No. in season	Title	Directed by	Written by	Original release date	Prod. code	U.S. viewers (millions)	Rating/share (households)
125	1	"Denise: The Saga Continues"	Tony Singletary	John Markus & Carmen Finestra & Gary Kott	September 21, 1989	0601	39.3	26.1/44
Denise surprises Cliff and Clair by returning home a week early from Africa. But even more surprisingly, she brings with her a new husband, naval officer Martin Kendall, and his 3-year-old daughter, Olivia, which Cliff and Clair are less than pleased about. Not only has she neglected to tell her parents about her marriage, she never even told them about Martin's existence. It doesn't take Cliff long to figure out where the newlyweds plan to live until Martin's naval housing is approved. Note: Joseph C. Phillips and Raven-Symoné join the cast as Martin and Olivia Kendall, respectively. Lisa Bonet (Denise) returns as regular cast member. This is the last appearance of Peter Costa as Peter.
126	2	"Surf's Up"	Tony Singletary	John Markus & Carmen Finestra & Gary Kott	September 28, 1989	0602	39.3	25.1/43
Cliff's story about how he and his roommates cleaned their floors in college inspires Theo and his buddies to strap soapy sponges to their butts and slide across the kitchen floor. Unfortunately, their landlord (who lives directly beneath them) is not amused by their ingenuity. Theo and his friends are evicted, spurring Cliff to persuade their landlord to reconsider so that Theo will not end up moving back into the Huxtables' already-crowded house. Guest star: Anthony Quinn as Mr. Fuentes Note: This is the first appearance of Keith Diamond as Danny. Series writer Carmen Finestra appears as Mr. Fuentes' son.
127	3	"I'm 'In' With the 'In' Crowd"	Tony Singletary	John Markus & Carmen Finestra & Gary Kott	October 5, 1989	0603	35.6	23.5/41
Vanessa and her girlfriends are asking for trouble when they play the alphabet game with a bottle of bourbon. Vanessa chug-a-lugs her way to a miserable night of sickness and through a nasty hangover the next day. While Cliff and Clair opt not to punish Vanessa, deeming her sickness punishment enough, they do decide to hammer the lesson home even further. They devise an alphabet game of their own that includes Rudy, four shot glasses, a bottle of booze (really tea) and a confused and extremely reluctant Vanessa. Guest appearance: Bill Cosby's real-life daughter Ensa Cosby, upon whom the character Vanessa is loosely based.
128	4	"Denise Kendall: Navy Wife"	Tony Singletary	John Markus & Carmen Finestra & Gary Kott	October 12, 1989	0605	32.3	23.5/40
Denise and Martin visit the Rhode Island naval base where they are expecting to be housed. There is just one little hitch: Denise has neglected to confirm the reservation for the housing. And although the Navy puts the Kendalls on a waiting list, for the next six months they will have to stay with Cliff and Clair. Meanwhile, Cliff desperately attempts to explain what he does for a living to Olivia.
129	5	"Theo's Gift"	Jay Sandrich	Mark St. Germain	October 19, 1989	0604	38.0	24.6/40
Theo proudly answers all of Cliff's questions as Theo practices for an upcoming mythology exam. But when he scores low on a test where he knew all the answers but could not always understand the questions, Cliff and Clair take him to a learning specialist, who tells them that Theo has dyslexia. And although Theo's diagnosed condition is manageable, his and Vanessa's litany of accusations (about Theo's years of suffering parental criticism for laziness and bad study habits) prove to be unbearable for Cliff and Clair.
130	6	"Denise Kendall: Babysitter"	Tony Singletary	John Markus & Carmen Finestra & Gary Kott	October 26, 1989	0606	37.9	24.5/41
Sondra and Elvin get a well-deserved night out when an overconfident Denise boasts that caring for two children should be as easy as looking after one. After a long evening of twin mayhem, complicated by a recurring local blackout, the exhausted family members wind up on the Huxtables' doorstep. Cliff and Clair wisely retreat to the basement for a good night's sleep.
131	7	"Shall We Dance?"	Jay Sandrich	John Markus & Carmen Finestra & Gary Kott	November 2, 1989	0607	40.2	25.4/39
Even after raising three daughters, Cliff's in over his head when Rudy reports her first "boy trouble." Clarence, the boy she likes, likes her. But his friends taunt him about it, so he treats Rudy badly to quiet them. Clarence and Rudy's relationship quickly deteriorates from a love match to teasing, name-calling and a knock-down, drag-out fight. Cliff tries to give Rudy his facts-of-life speech (the one about boys being like helicopters and girls being like geraniums). But at the school dance, the wise Mrs. McGee pairs Rudy and Clarence and they mend fences all on their own. Guest star: Elaine Stritch Note: Phylicia Rashād, Lisa Bonet, Joseph C. Phillips and Raven-Symoné appeared on the "Forever Hold Your Peace" episode of A Different World which aired later that evening.
132	8	"The Day the Spores Landed"	Neema Barnette	John Markus & Carmen Finestra & Gary Kott	November 9, 1989	0608	42.3	26.5/42
Cliff's ingestion of a sausage hero immediately before bedtime brings on a dream in which spores contaminate the U.S. water supply (except in New Jersey) and impregnate thousands of men, including Cliff, Elvin and Martin. Theo, the only unwed mother-to-be, soon joins them. They commiserate and console each other, but their solace is short-lived. Contractions send them all to the hospital and into the most bizarre delivery room. Guest voice-over: NBC News correspondent John Palmer
133	9	"Cliff's Wet Adventure" "Thanksgiving at the Huxtables"	Jay Sandrich	John Markus & Carmen Finestra	November 16, 1989	0610	41.8	26.3/41
When Martin's ex-wife Paula (Victoria Rowell) calls Olivia from the airport after her departure is delayed, Denise impulsively invites the woman she has never met to join the Huxtables for Thanksgiving dinner. Amid the spying of curious family members and acute nervousness from Martin, Denise gets a chance to have an enlightening conversation with the woman whose child she is raising. In the meantime, Clair keeps sending Cliff out into the rain for last-minute Thanksgiving groceries.
134	10	"Grampy and Nu-Nu Visit the Huxtables"	Tony Singletary	John Markus & Gary Kott	November 30, 1989	0609	42.8	27.1/43
Chocoholics Cliff and Olivia do a hatchet job on the cake that Clair's baked for Denise's in-laws (Moses Gunn and Nancy Wilson), extracting a large circle from its middle. The two culprits quickly cover up their defacement of the dessert but to no avail – Clair discovers the icing over the hole they have stuffed with paper towels. Meanwhile, Denise frets over her upcoming meeting with the woman who has reportedly said to Martin about Denise, "I can't stand her". When Clair asks Lorraine, Martin's mother, to clarify the remark, it becomes clear that Martin's the culprit here. And it is three against one when Denise, Clair, and Lorraine give Martin a hard time for being so hard of hearing.
135	11	"Cliff la Douce"	Jay Sandrich	Carmen Finestra & Gary Kott	December 7, 1989	0611	37.4	24.3/39
Clair's in Washington on a case and Cliff's in charge – but just barely. Rudy follows Cliff's advice on how to deal with her on-again, off-again friends – only to succeed in alienating all of them. Even when Cliff gets himself into trouble with Rudy's teacher for ghost-writing Rudy's history composition, he remains determined to handle the household on his own. But when Vanessa pulls the wool almost far enough over Cliff's eyes to get away with going to a college party, it falls on Clair to inform him. Also, Theo tries to use Olivia to get a bunch of girls' phone numbers, but gets caught by Justine.
136	12	"Getting to Know You"	Tony Singletary	John Markus & Carmen Finestra & Gary Kott	December 14, 1989	0612	34.0	22.2/37
Martin and Cliff spend some time together and develop a new, warm appreciation for each other. When Cliff confesses his secret regret about not having given Denise away at her wedding, Martin stages an informal ceremony in the Huxtable living room, so Cliff can see his wish come true. Elsewhere, Elvin slowly warms up to his elf's makeup and costume for a Christmas show at the hospital. And Denise tries to explain what Santa Claus looks like to a suspicious and highly skeptical Olivia, who counters with "If Santa Claus has a little bit of everyone inside him, is that why he's so fat?"
137	13	"Elvin Pays for Dinner"	Jay Sandrich	John Markus & Gary Kott	January 4, 1990	0613	37.1	24.2/37
Sondra decides to stay home to work on her law school application, happily forfeiting a chance to go out to dinner with Elvin, his old college chum Judy and Judy's sister. Elvin gallantly offers to stay home with Sondra, but she insists that he go. However, when he pays for the dinner, Sondra's so angry, she refuses to speak to him. Meanwhile, Sondra, who expects Clair to side with her after hearing the whole story, gets a shocking surprise when Clair tells her that she is just as much to blame for the whole situation as Elvin and probably even more because she was not honest with him or herself to begin with.
138	14	"Cliff's Nightmare"	Tony Singletary	Jeff Lewis & Bill Prady	January 11, 1990	0526	36.8	23.3/36
Cliff's late-night eating habits finally bite back. His nightmare is filled with such Muppet characters as overstuffed talking sandwiches, back-talking refrigerator denizens and a bloodthirsty mob of creatures in the operating theater of Cliff's hospital. It seems that Cliff is scheduled to perform a delicate operation for their viewing pleasure, but he somehow winds up on the table as the patient, before waking up safe and sound in his own bed. Guest stars: The Muppets, performed by Steve Whitmire, Dave Goelz, Richard Hunt, Kevin Clash, Fran Brill, voice-over by Cliff's friend Jeffery Engels (Wallace Shawn) Note: This episode was originally produced for season 5, but did not air until season 6. Coincidentally, following Jim Henson's death five months after this first aired, an in-memory note of Henson was added after the closing credits when the episode reaired the following summer, and is utilized on all subsequent prints.
139	15	"Denise Kendall: Singles Counselor"	Tony Singletary	John Markus & Carmen Finestra	January 18, 1990	0614	38.4	23.4/36
When Denise's snappy repartee gives Vanessa the courage to approach handsome Elliott in a cafe, all looks promising. But later on, as Denise envisions a career as a single's counselor, Vanessa storms in to announce that Denise has ruined her life: Elliott already has a girlfriend named Shana. Elliott, a weakling who is attached to Shana but smitten with Vanessa, then shows up to ask Dr. Denise for her advice on how to handle the situation. Finally, Shana (Malinda Williams) arrives to give Denise a piece of her mind.
140	16	"The Birthday Party"	Tony Singletary	John Markus & Carmen Finestra & Gary Kott	January 25, 1990	0615	41.0	25.0/39
Will cultures and tastes clash? Denise plans a healthful, fully organic menu for Olivia's birthday party. Cliff and Clair contend that kids expect chocolate cake and junk food – and will not settle for less. So they agree to offer the children both kinds of food and monitor which cake the kids actually prefer. During the day, Cliff is pressed into child-sitting and it takes all his ingenuity to keep the party going.
141	17	"Not Everybody Loves the Blues"	Chuck Vinson	Mark St. Germain	February 1, 1990	0616	35.5	22.4/35
Elvin and Theo catch blues great Riley Jackson (B.B. King) at a local club and Theo is blown away by his singing. Coincidentally, the next day, Jackson is at the Huxtable house when Theo drops by to rave about his "discovery" of this great singer. Jackson is an old friend of Grandpa Russell's and he has invited the whole Huxtable family to hear him play that night. Everyone but the jaded, world-weary Vanessa is excited about the concert.
142	18	"Rudy's Walk on the Wild Side"	Jay Sandrich	Lore Kimbrough & Ehrich Van Lowe	February 8, 1990	0617	37.1	22.9/36
Eagerness to purchase a sweatshirt that lights up overshadows better judgment when Rudy "borrows" $2.30 from the money Clair's left on the counter to pay the dry cleaning bill. Rudy's attempts to replace the money before Clair finds it missing lead her further into misery and duplicity. Cliff finally adds it all up and pulls Rudy aside for a heart-to-heart talk. It yields some truths for both of them. Rudy realizes that she was wrong and must confess to Clair. And Cliff learns why Rudy was afraid to ask him for the money.
–	–	"The Cosby Outtakes Show"	Chuck Vinson	John Markus & Carmen Finestra & Gary Kott	February 12, 1990	0627	35.2	21.6/33
Phylicia Rashād, Malcolm-Jamal Warner, Lisa Bonet, Tempestt Bledsoe, Keshia Knight Pulliam and Raven-Symoné host this special episode featuring bloopers from the past five seasons. Note: Special appearance by Condola Phyleia Rashād, Phylicia Rashād's daughter. This episode was excluded from The Cosby Show regular syndication cycle, but is included as a bonus feature in the Season 1 DVD set. It is not, however, included in the Season 6 DVD set released by First Look Studios and Millennium Entertainment, but is included in the Season 6 DVD set released by Mill Creek Entertainment.
143	19	"Mr. Sandman"	Tony Singletary	John Markus & Carmen Finestra & Gary Kott	February 15, 1990	0618	37.8	23.9/37
Rudy's down in the dumps because she has been partnered with the best male dancer in school for an upcoming show. Cliff and Clair intensify her tap dancing lessons in an effort to boost her confidence for the big day. But it is Cliff who is most inspired. Overconfident, he puts on a pair of taps and faces off against Rudy's teacher, Sandman Sims. The tap-stepping marathon leaves Cliff beaten and bowed. Rudy, on the other hand, shines on the big night with her partner George.
144	20	"Isn't It Romantic?"	Tony Singletary	John Markus & Carmen Finestra & Gary Kott	February 22, 1990	0619	37.6	23.6/37
Theo throws Cliff, Elvin, and Martin a challenge they cannot ignore: prove that they are not living in "the marriage graveyard." Cliff devises a secret competition that will not only resurrect the romance in their lives but will determine which of the husbands is the most romantic. According to his plan, the reactions of their wives to some specially selected presents will be the barometer for determining "The Emperor of Romance." But Olivia informs the women just before the big event, leaving the three wives to plot revenge for being used as pawns in their husbands' macho game.
145	21	"Theo's Dirty Laundry"	Jay Sandrich	John Markus & Carmen Finestra & Gary Kott	March 15, 1990	0620	33.9	21.8/36
Theo and Justine take a big step without telling either set of parents, and it all comes out, literally, in the wash. When Cliff finds Justine's undergarments in Theo's wash load, Theo comes clean and admits that he and Justine have been living together ever since her roommate moved out. When Cliff and Clair refuse to support him unless he returns to his own apartment, Theo takes a bold and defiant stand. But level-headed Justine brings reality back into focus for Theo, and together they make a wise decision for their future.
146	22	"What's It All About?"	Jay Sandrich	John Markus & Carmen Finestra	March 22, 1990	0621	35.5	23.2/38
Exhausted, overworked and with patience worn thin, Clair wonders if she has "anything left to give." Cliff insists that she get away for a few days and sends her off to a secluded cabin in the woods for some rest and relaxation. But the hideaway is drafty, cold, and barely functional. Clair longs to come home to the relative comfort of noise and chaos in the Huxtable house.
147	23	"Off to See the Wretched"	Carl Lauten & Malcolm-Jamal Warner	Mark St. Germain	April 5, 1990	0622	32.8	21.8/38
Vanessa and her girlfriends display extremely bad judgement when they sneak off to a rock concert in Baltimore behind their parents' backs, but the trip ends in disaster as their car, tickets, and spending money are all stolen. After Cliff and Clair discover the deception and retrieve Vanessa in the wee hours of the morning, Clair rages at Vanessa over the latter's betrayal of trust and sends her to bed in tears. Meanwhile, Olivia tests her stand-up comedy skills on Cliff, first by getting jokes from a pay-per-minute phone service and then by making up some of her own. Note: This episode marks Malcolm-Jamal Warner's Cosby Show directorial debut. His character did not appear in the episode.
148	24	"The Moves"	Tony Singletary	Mark St. Germain	April 19, 1990	0623	32.4	21.1/37
Clair brings her friend and rival attorney, Bernice (Mercedes Ruehl), home to visit while Cliff's entertaining a recently divorced Jeffrey Engels (Wallace Shawn). Despite their physical disparity, Jeffrey and Bernice really hit it off. But Jeffrey is so self-conscious about his new toupee that he can't concentrate on Bernice and blows what Cliff and Clair hoped might be the beginning of a beautiful friendship.
149	25	"Live and Learn"	Tony Singletary	Matt Robinson	April 26, 1990	0624	28.7	19.2/36
Denise wants to become a teacher but is frustrated over the prospect of having to restart college in order to earn the needed degree. Seeing that Olivia's preschool teachers (Wilton Banks and Max Roach) use music and rap as part of their lessons, she insists that she is ready to take on the job but gets a reality check from a friend (Suzzanne Douglas) who teaches elementary school. The humbling experience prompts her to enroll in Medgar Evers College and pursue a degree in education. Note: This episode was dedicated to Ryan White, who died of AIDS, with an in-memory note after the closing credits.
150	26	"The Storyteller"	Carl Lauten	Lore Kimbrough	May 3, 1990	0625	28.3	18.5/33
Cliff's great aunt, Harriet "Gramtee" McCutcheon (Minnie Gentry), comes to visit from Norfolk, Virginia for her 98th birthday. The family plans to go to church on Sunday, but Olivia would rather go to the zoo with her friend Kai. But after spending some time with Gramtee, Olivia decides that she would rather go to church instead of the zoo. The church service concludes with Mavis Staples leading the choir in a spirit-filled rendition of Marvin Gaye's "Wholy Holy" as a tribute to Gramtee. Note: The church service was filmed at St. James Presbyterian Church in Harlem.

=== Season 7 (1990–1991) ===
This season's opening credits sequence originally was to use a mural entitled "Street of Dreams," painted by inner-city youth from the Creative Arts Workshop in Harlem. The producers discarded the idea when their lawyers said that in order to use the mural, they would have to get permission from all 63 young artists. Instead, a new mural was produced that combined some of the elements of the original and used many of the same colors. The owners of the mural threatened to sue and denounced the show for ripping off the children. Carsey-Werner tried to negotiate a settlement with Creative Arts Workshop, but Bill Cosby decided to replace the opening credits with the version from the previous season. Only four episodes featured the original season-seven opening credits. In all other episodes in the show's original run, and in all repeats as well as in syndication, only the replacement sequence was used. However, some international prints use the original sequence for the first four episodes.

New cast member Erika Alexander was featured in the original season-seven sequence, but only her name and role are listed in the replacement sequence. The spoken phrase "This is the best elevator music I've ever heard!" was also removed, except for one episode in 1991.

Throughout this season, Cosby was often seen wearing a small black button with the letters "SD Jr." as a tribute to Sammy Davis Jr., who died in May 1990.

This season also marks Lisa Bonet’s final season of the show as Denise.

No. overall	No. in season	Title	Directed by	Written by	Original release date	Prod. code	U.S. viewers (millions)	Rating/share (households)
151	1	"Same Time Next Year"	Jay Sandrich	Ehrich Van Lowe	September 20, 1990	0701	30.5	19.8/33
Cliff and Clair look forward to reclaiming the house as another school year begins. Vanessa is on her way to college, and Rudy is rushed off to school. But Rudy's afraid that her prepubescent body will not measure up with the other sixth-graders, and Olivia is starting her first day of pre-school. Finally, Cliff and Clair's peaceful afternoon is shattered when a weary Theo returns from his whirlwind, 17-day European tour. Note: In a scene prior to the opening credits, Olivia enters Cliff's bedroom wearing a Bart Simpson mask. It is a reference to Fox's decision to move The Simpsons to Thursdays at 8:00 pm Eastern, presenting The Cosby Show with its first significant ratings challenge. This is the only episode in the series that has a cold open.
152	2	"Bird in the Hand"	Jay Sandrich	Steve Kline & Bryan Winter	September 27, 1990	0702	27.8	18.4/31
Cliff plans to attend an auction where he hopes to outbid his friendly nemesis, Dr. Harmon, to add a rare Charlie Parker record to his jazz collection. Instead, he gets recruited into helping out at Olivia's preschool. Undaunted, Cliff arranges to bid by phone. But when Harmon drops out and Claire shows up to the auction, the couple unknowingly begins bidding against each other.
153	3	"Last Barbecue"	Ellen Falcon	Bernie Kukoff & Janet Leahy	October 4, 1990	0704	27.9	19.5/33
Theo's plan to hire a stripper for brother-in-law Martin's belated bachelor party sets off sparks in the Huxtable house and ignites a fight between the men and women in the family. While the men call the striptease "traditional," the women consider it sexist and demeaning. Grandma and Grandpa Huxtable show up later and get involved in the quarreling. But by the time the battle wanes, its participants are in a romantic mood again. Is it the influence of reason or, as Cliff claims, the secret ingredient in his barbecue sauce? Notes: This episode was removed from syndication after Bill Cosby admitted to purchasing quaaludes with the intent to give them to women with whom he wanted to have sex.
154	4	"Period of Adjustment"	Ellen Falcon	Gordon Gartrelle & Lore Kimbrough	October 11, 1990	0703	28.5	18.5/29
Clair's teenage cousin Pam Tucker moves into the Huxtable home, triggering a period of adjustment for all concerned. Although she appreciates the upscale surroundings, Cliff and Clair's rules cause difficulty for the lifestyle she is accustomed to. Pam has already accepted an invitation from her boyfriend Slide, but is blocked by the Huxtables' curfew. However, while testing the waters, she begins to appreciate the value of the curfew and the wisdom of its enforcers. Notes: Erika Alexander joins the cast as Pam Tucker. This is the first appearances of Karen Malina White as Charmaine, Allen Payne as Lance, and Mushond Lee as Slide, Pam's friends.
155	5	"It's All in the Game"	Neema Barnette	Janet Leahy & Bryan Winter	October 18, 1990	0706	28.5	18.5/29
The Huxtables return from a romantic weekend in Vermont to find the household in chaos. Olivia has "cleaned" her crayons in the new washing machine, wrecking it and Theo's clothes in the process; Vanessa has hit a parked vehicle with Cliff's car; Theo has appropriated various Huxtable household items for use in his own apartment. It is time for one of Cliff's seminars on the hardships of being a parent. However, the Huxtable children turn the tables to deliver a discourse of their own: an expose of what it is like to be on the receiving end of one of Cliff's famous talks.
156	6	"Getting the Story"	Ellen Falcon	Story by : Mark St. Germain; Teleplay by : Lore Kimbrough & Janet Leahy	October 25, 1990	0705	27.3	18.0/29
Rudy and Kenny document Clair's job for a school video contest because Cliff's job is not "exciting enough." Their dreams of glory quickly fade as Clair's workday fails to deliver the criminals and excitement the students anticipate. In desperation, they turn to Cliff. At the hospital, they con an expectant father into taping his son's birth and make plans to pass the footage off as their own. When Cliff intervenes, all seems lost, but they later realize they can finish the film by simply documenting the truth.
157	7	"Just Thinking About It"	Jay Sandrich	Bernie Kukoff & Ehrich Van Lowe	November 1, 1990	0707	31.5	20.2/31
158	8	"Just Thinking About It"	Jay Sandrich	Bernie Kukoff & Ehrich Van Lowe	November 1, 1990	0708	31.5	20.2/31
Pam's boyfriend Slide wants to take their relationship to "the next level" but Pam has reservations. Cliff and Clair's advice strengthens Pam's resolve to take things at her own speed. But caught between his friends and his hormones, Slide keeps pressing until Pam explodes in indignation. Still, she does not want to lose him to another girl. Meanwhile, Olivia introduces the family to Dwayne, an invisible Saint Bernard who becomes a most convenient scapegoat for all of Olivia's escapades. Guest Star: Cynthia Bailey as Sheniquah Watkins
159	9	"The Infantry Has Landed (and They've Fallen Off the Roof)"	John Bowab	Gordon Gartrelle & Lore Kimbrough & Janet Leahy	November 8, 1990	0712	28.0	17.9/27
Psychology major Theo prepares a personality profile on Cliff, who is so secretive, Theo dubs the syndrome "Fugitive fantasy fear." When Rudy gets her first period, the event elicits a spate of myths from her girlfriends and a disagreement with Clair about how to celebrate Rudy's special day. Having already read a book on menstruation, Rudy is able to dispel her friends' outlandish claims. But, in a late night heart-to-heart talk with Clair, Rudy's real concerns about womanhood finally surface.
160	10	"You Can Go Home Again"	Oz Scott	Lore Kimbrough & Steve Kline & Bernie Kukoff	November 15, 1990	0709	27.5	17.7/28
Inspired by a rare weekend alone together in the Huxtable house, Denise and Martin go searching for affordable apartment. Rudy, tired of sharing sleeping space with Olivia, launches a determined campaign for their soon-to-be-vacated room. When Martin and Denise come home tired, frustrated, and empty-handed, Theo tells them about a one-bedroom opportunity. However, where the ever-optimistic Denise sees minimalist charm and efficiency in the offbeat space, practical-minded Martin sees only a cramped trailer. And when they get back home, they must face the wrath of a still-roomless Rudy.
161	11	"It's a Boy"	Chuck Vinson	Bernie Kukoff & Ehrich Van Lowe	November 29, 1990	0710	28.6	18.1/28
Having broken up with Slide, Pam sets her sights on Aaron, a new student whose intelligence, compassion, and integrity are all exceptional. Meanwhile, Alfred, a nervous expectant father, turns to Cliff for tips on how to play basketball with his future son. Alfred also gets some insights from Theo on how boys view their fathers when it comes to sports. And both Alfred and Cliff get an enlightening lesson from their wives. Finally, Olivia announces her intention of becoming a doctor as well as a professional football player. Note: This is the first appearance of Seth Gilliam as Aaron.
162	12	"Clair's Liberation"	John Bowab	Bernie Kukoff & Ehrich Van Lowe	December 6, 1990	0713	24.6	16.1/25
Clair's announcement that she is beginning menopause triggers a series of bizarre misinterpretations of her behavior by her children. Since the kids expect the stereotypical indecision, mood swings, weeping, and hot flashes, Cliff and Clair decide to give them all the melodrama they can possibly handle. Pam and Aaron grow closer as he demonstrates that some of the best things in life are free – like a moonlight tour of their historic neighborhood.
163	13	"It's Your Move"	Jay Sandrich	Steve Kline & Bryan Winter	December 13, 1990	0714	27.1	17.7/39
It's playoff time, but Sondra upsets Elvin's football-watching plans by promising their help in moving two friends to a new apartment. Afraid he will miss the entire game, Elvin enlists the aid of his brothers-in-lawTheo and Martin to hurry things along, which they do while bickering with Sondra and Nancy. Meanwhile, Clair demonstrates some impressive baton-twirling moves, while Olivia sticks to her original plan to become "Dr. Crusher, Middle Linebacker". Note: Voiceover cameo by Ahmad Rashad
164	14	"Theo's Final Final"	Neema Barnette	Elaine Arata	January 3, 1991	0715	31.4	20.0/30
Theo is just one good grade away from the Dean's List. Fortified with devil's-food donuts and chocolate milk, he is determined to cram for tomorrow's economics final, until he lifts his head from the book in the college cafe and locks eyes with the girl of his dreams. Theo escorts Cheryl to a party instead of studying. Yet even while close dancing, his mind wanders to current indicators and the Gross National Product. Guest stars: Vanessa A. Williams (who portrayed Jade in season 5) as Cheryl, Rachel True as Nicki and Michael Weatherly as Theo's roommate
165	15	"Attack of the Killer B's"	Art Dielhenn	Elaine Arata & Lore Kimbrough	January 10, 1991	0717	27.7	17.8/27
Theo helps Pam improve her grades – so much so that she starts thinking about college. Unfortunately, her Ivy League dreams are dashed by the nightmare of how much it will cost to get there. Her classmates are no help either, jealous of her improving grades. At home, Olivia announces her intention to become President, certain that will give her the power to create her own flag, eat turkey stuffed with french fries and stay up late. Note: This was Lisa Bonet's final taping as Denise, who appears briefly in the first scene of the episode. In airdate order, Bonet appears in two more episodes.
166	16	"Total Control"	Jay Sandrich	Bernie Kukoff & Ehrich Van Lowe	January 31, 1991	0718	25.9	16.9/25
Basketball coach Ray Evans (John Ritter) and his wife Alicia (Amy Yasbeck) have devised the perfect plan for the birth of their first child. Their practice sessions run like clockwork, but when the first contractions begin, Ray falls apart. Three hours into labor, a stressed-out Alicia turns on him – blaming Ray for "her condition." After being thrown out of the room, it falls on Cliff to raise Ray's spirits. Note: This is the only episode in which none of the Huxtable children appear. Phylicia Rashad also does not appear. Bill Cosby and Raven-Symoné are the only main cast members to appear in this episode. The set used for the expectant couple's home is the same one used for the Huxtable home in the pilot episode.
167	17	"Adventures in Babysitting"	Oz Scott	Steve Kline	February 7, 1991	0719	24.9	16.8/26
When Cliff and Dr. Harmon ditch their wives to team up for the charity pinochle tournament, the rejected spouses decide to enter the tournament themselves. But when the wives defeat the defending champions, suddenly only Cliff and Jim stand between them and the coveted trophy. Meanwhile, with Rudy as baby-sitter, Olivia pouts her way into staying up late and watching a horror movie. But when their imaginations detect monsters in the house, the girls take measures to protect themselves. Guest star: Bern Nadette Stanis
168	18	"27 and Still Cooking"	Neema Barnette	Gordon Gartrelle & Janet Leahy	February 14, 1991	0716	24.5	15.9/25
Cliff has an elaborate 27th wedding anniversary surprise for Clair – a dining room re-creation of the tiny Caribbean restaurant where they dined during their honeymoon. He tracks down the original chef and orders a calypso band to entertain for the evening. But when the special day arrives, the chef, now a gourmet prima donna, balks at re-creating a menu from 27 years ago; the calypso band arrives two hours early; Theo, Pam, and Rudy, the volunteer decoration committee, have difficulty honoring their commitment; and on top of everything, Cliff is coming down with a case of the flu.
169	19	"The Return of the Clairettes"	Neema Barnette	Lisa Albert	February 21, 1991	0720	27.0	17.1/26
Rudy plans to go to the movies with two girls and three boys. But her first date is jeopardized when the other two girls cancel. Clair offers to double date with Rudy and Scott, but that means Scott must face Cliff's interrogations. Meanwhile, a visit from Clair's old friend Kris (Leslie Uggams) sparks an evening of over-the-top songs and camp that leaves the husbands feeling left out.
170	20	"No More Mr. Nice Guy"	Jay Sandrich	Steve Kline & Bryan Winter	February 28, 1991	0711	28.5	18.5/29
With everyone else out of the house, Theo prepares for a romantic evening with his girlfriend, Cheryl. But his plans are thwarted by a serious of interruptions: Theo's friend Ellen drops by just as she starts to come down with an illness, followed by her boyfriend Denny who has his own paranoia about his girlfriend's recent activities; Cliff and Clair return home, their ski weekend rained out; Grandma and Grandpa Huxtable drop by to borrow a table saw, and Elvin arrives to transport it to their house in his van.
171	21	"Home Remedies"	Jay Sandrich	Mark St. Germain	March 7, 1991	0722	25.4	16.9/28
Olivia, in bed with a cold and laryngitis, is miserable because she will not be able to sing at Russell and Anna Huxtable's 55th wedding anniversary. Despite the exotic home remedies suggested by the steady stream of would-be-doctors in the house, it is Cliff who actually saves the day by finding a way for Olivia to voice her feelings at the party. Meanwhile, Lance and Charmaine reminisce about the high points of their romance, but their fuzzy memories are no match for Aaron's total recall of even the most obscure events in his and Pam's recent relationship. Note: Olivia lip-synchs Koko Taylor's "I'm a Woman".
172	22	"Nightmare on Stigwood Avenue"	Carl Lauten & Malcolm-Jamal Warner	Lore Kimbrough & Steve Kline	March 21, 1991	0723	24.2	15.8/26
A special dream episode is a nightmare for Rudy, who cannot escape the evil plots of Olivia. As a modern Greek chorus (Pam, Charmaine, and Vanessa) comments on the action, Olivia demonstrates her uncanny ability to undermine Rudy at every turn, manipulate the Huxtables into getting what she wants, and Rudy seems to be the only person in the dream who can see through it.
173	23	"There's Still No Joy in Mudville"	Carl Lauten	Gordon Gartrelle & Matt Robinson	April 4, 1991	0721	25.2	16.7/26
It's bowling night: Cliff's team loses, and it falls on him to buy dinner. During the post-game Chinese meal, Carleton and Dr. Harmon – two cricket-playing Caribbean natives – must endure a walk down baseball's memory lane led by baseball greats (Frank Robinson and Joe Black). Note: This is the final appearance of Sullivan Walker as Dr. James Harmon.
174	24	"Cliff and Jake"	Jay Sandrich	Mark St. Germain	April 11, 1991	0626	22.1	15.6/27
Everyone tries to keep Cliff from hearing about the 50%-off sale at Jake's, his favorite appliance store. But their efforts are to no avail: Cliff already has set his sights on an electric sander. While at the store, Cliff hears Jake recount the story of the damages he had to pay to Stanley Rappaport, his former friend (and now worst enemy), for a traffic accident. It does not mean much to Cliff until Jake's daughter Cookie introduces Cliff to her fiance, Jonathan Rappaport, and begs Cliff to reconcile Jake with Jonathan's father, Stanley. Guest stars: Red Buttons, E. G. Marshall and Audrey Landers. Notes: This is the final appearance of Lisa Bonet as Denise. This episode was originally produced for season six.
175	25	"Theo and the Kids: Part 1"	John Bowab	Bernie Kukoff & Ehrich Van Lowe	April 25, 1991	0724	20.2	14.4/25
Theo begins his internship in psychology as a counselor at a local community center. His new charges test him immediately. Wise to their tricks because he used to pull them himself, Theo is initially in control, then loses his cool. The next day, he is less concerned about his image and more interested in helping his kids. One student, Stanley, reminds him of himself when he was younger: defensive about his messy notebook, sloppy handwriting, and slow reading speed. Theo begins to suspect that Stanley has a learning disability, too. Guest star: Lynne Thigpen Notes: This is the first appearance of Merlin Santana as Stanley and Eugene Byrd as Eugene. This is the first and only two-part episode in which the two parts of the episode premiered on separate nights and not back-to-back.
176	26	"Theo and the Kids: Part 2"	John Bowab	Bernie Kukoff & Ehrich Van Lowe	May 2, 1991	0725	22.1	15.2/27
As he grows more confident in his abilities and judgment, Theo's personal involvement with his students at the community center deepens. He is anxious to persuade Stanley to be tested for dyslexia; he is concerned about another boy who may have to leave the after-school program to earn extra money for his family. Theo's growing realization that he cannot help everyone in his care hits hard, but leaves him with a new sense of maturity and renewed confidence in his chosen vocation.

=== Season 8 (1991–1992) ===
The mural inspired by "Street of Dreams", originally painted by inner-city youth from the Creative Arts Workshop in Harlem, was finally used full-time in season eight. The cast now danced to a hip-hop arrangement of "Kiss Me" that featured Lester Bowie on trumpet, while dressed in brightly colored clothing with a theme similar to the music. The scenes of Bonet and Phillips in the original opening sequence were removed. After the controversy from the previous season, the producers gave recognition to the painters of the original mural in the closing credits. Malcolm-Jamal Warner wore glasses in this set of opening credits, but not in any episodes. At the end of the sequence, Cosby turns his head and looks into the camera as he did in seasons two through four.

A few episodes from season seven used this opening, albeit with Bonet and Phillips in the opening credits, and at the end of the sequence, Bill Cosby would walk off and say, "Yo, chill out! Don't put your face in the mud, Pally!"

The final episode "And So We Commence" features an extended sequence, with clips of each cast member dancing from the opening credits of every season (except season 1, which only showed the cast in a series of photographs). The finale was taped on Friday, March 6, 1992, under production codes 0823 and 0824.

A running gag throughout this season involves the house's front doorbell, which malfunctions in a variety of bizarre ways despite Cliff's attempts to fix it.

No. overall	No. in season	Title	Directed by	Written by	Original release date	Prod. code	U.S. viewers (millions)	Rating/share (households)
177	1	"With This Ring?"	John Bowab	Adriana Trigiani	September 19, 1991	0801	28.1	18.6/31
Vanessa, home from college, announces her engagement. She then reveals her year-long relationship and six-month engagement to Dabnis, a college maintenance supervisor who is almost 30 years old. Since Cliff and Clair did not know that Vanessa was even dating anyone, the news is a shock. Cliff and Clair take turns confronting their supposedly level-headed daughter. Clair voices concern about how far apart Vanessa and Dabnis are in age, while Cliff questions Vanessa's belated presentation of her fiance. Note: This is the first appearance of William Thomas, Jr. as Dabnis Brickey.
178	2	"There's No Place Like This Home"	John Bowab	Gordon Gartrelle & Janet Leahy	September 26, 1991	0802	23.9	16.2/27
On the eve of co-signing a loan that will enable Elvin and Sondra to purchase their own home, Cliff also reveals plans to build an extension on the house. But when Elvin and Sondra's closing is postponed indefinitely, they are left with no place to live. The Tibideaux's take Martin and Denise's old room, and Olivia moves in with Rudy. Cliff cheers up considerably, though, when Clair suggests that they expand the Huxtable kitchen and include that window herb-garden Cliff has always wanted.
179	3	"Particles in Motion"	John Bowab	Story by : Adriana Trigiani & Linda M. Yearwood; Teleplay by : Adriana Trigiani	October 3, 1991	0804	23.6	16.6/28
The Huxtable family's life is in a period of upheaval: expansion of the kitchen begins; Theo faces his first parent-counselor night at the community center, and gears up by rehearsing with Cliff and Clair; and, much to Kenny's consternation, Rudy encounters romance with one of Theo's students. Sparks fly between Stanley and Kenny after Kenny sabotages Rudy and Stanley's first date. Meanwhile, Theo feels romantic tension between him and young mother Lisa (Saundra Quarterman).
180	4	"Pam Applies to College"	John Bowab	Walter Allen Bennett, Jr.	October 10, 1991	0803	21.8	15.4/25
While construction on the Huxtable kitchen progresses, Pam laments her low grades. Now a senior, Pam wants to attend a college like Hillman with her best friend, Charmaine. Only two things are holding Pam back; her low GPA and her low SAT scores. Her guidance counselor, Mr. Bostic (Richard Lawson), advises her to apply to a community college, and Cliff casts doubt on her chances for acceptance at a major school. To Pam, it seems as if the whole world is against her; even her best friend will be leaving her.
181	5	"Warning: A Double-Lit Candle Can Cause a Meltdown"	Malcolm-Jamal Warner	Walter Allen Bennett, Jr.	October 17, 1991	0808	21.9	15.5/25
Rudy and two girlfriends don makeup and trendy clothes to crash The Exchange, an over-16 dance club in New York City. Cliff and Clair overhear the plan and decide to let them go – with Pam, Lance, and Charmaine as secret chaperones. Since the teen club is a big step down for them, the three mature high schoolers are hoping that no one recognizes them. A clubgoer tries to hit on Rudy and her friends; Lance steers him away without blowing his cover. But when Pam wins a chance to dance with headline rapper J.T. Freeze, she completely loses her cool. Guest stars: rapper Special Ed and actor/rapper Daryl "Chill" Mitchell
182	6	"It's Apparent to Everyone"	Neema Barnette	Hugh O'Neill	October 24, 1991	0805	22.3	15.3/24
With Elvin, Sondra, and the twins living in the Huxtable home for several weeks, nerves have started to fray. When Cliff temporarily confines the twins in an overturned playpen while he vacuums up cookie crumbs, Sondra explodes, accusing him of cruelty. Tempers flare and recriminations fly between the four adults. When Cliff turns to Russell for help, his father is sympathetic, but firm. He will offer support, but not in the form of lodging.
183	7	"The Iceman Bricketh"	Carl Lauten	Courtney Flavin & Hugh O'Neill & Adriana Trigiani	October 31, 1991	0807	21.0	14.8/25
Russell has heard that Vanessa is engaged, but to a 45-year-old janitor. Alarmed, Russell (Cliff's father) and Carrie (Clair's mother) confront Cliff and Clair, who confirm the engagement and try to set the record straight on Dabnis. But the anxious grandparents are not satisfied. So, on his second ever visit to the home, Dabnis gets confronted by Clair's mother and Cliff's father while Vanessa stays in the kitchen. She is disconcerted by Cliff and Clair's new, positive attitude toward Dabnis, and surprised to see Dabnis get resounding approval up from her grandparents. Suddenly, all the pressure is on Vanessa to set a wedding date.
184	8	"Olivia's Field Trip"	John Bowab	Courtney Flavin	November 7, 1991	0806	25.1	16.3/25
When Rudy entered junior high, Cliff thought he was finally done with field trips. Olivia's class trip to the natural history museum lacks one chaperone; provided there is no singing on the bus, Cliff agrees. His fellow chaperone is know-it-all neighbor Jeffrey Engels (Wallace Shawn). Inside the museum, Jeffrey's high-brow explanations confuse the children. Cliff seizes the opportunity to impress them with his colorful storytelling; his description of the grizzly bear is so vivid, his young audience scatters in terror. Meanwhile, Clair steps in to help Theo get his money back from an unscrupulous vendor who sold him a batch of shoddy T-shirts intended for a community center fundraiser.
185	9	"For Men Only"	John Bowab	Walter Allen Bennett, Jr.	November 14, 1991	0809	23.1	16.4/26
Cliff leads a "For Men Only" guidance class at the community center, giving the boys some plain talk about living, working, and surviving in the real world. Meanwhile, Russell's adventures in babysitting for Olivia include an introduction into the world of video games. Trying to wean Olivia from her addiction, Russell suggests a game of pick-up sticks. But, unimpressed by Russell's old-fashioned diversion, Olivia convinces him to give her pastime a try instead – and another videogame-maniac is born.
186	10	"Olivia Comes Out of the Closet"	John Bowab	Kathleen McGhee-Anderson	November 21, 1991	0812	24.3	15.9/25
Olivia is upset because Martin is leaving for the Orient. After extracting a promise that he will not leave without saying goodbye, Olivia hides herself in the living room closet, hoping to delay his departure indefinitely. The rest of the family prepares to welcome legendary African singer Miriam Makeba to the Huxtable home. But Ms. Makeba almost gets lost in the shuffle when Martin comes downstairs to leave, Olivia is nowhere to be found and the whole family abandons their honored guest to search for the six-year-old. Guest star: Joseph C. Phillips as Martin Kendall Note: This is the final appearance of Joseph C. Phillips as Martin.
187	11	"Two Is a Crowd"	Jay Sandrich	Gordon Gartrelle & Janet Leahy	December 5, 1991	0810	24.9	16.8/26
Kenny arrives to console Rudy, with the word around school being that Rudy and Stanley are no longer dating. Kenny, Rudy's old friend, sees it as an opportunity to further his own chances. Stanley may not be as irrelevant as Kenny thinks. Meanwhile, Dabnis follows Vanessa to the Huxtable home, confused about a note she left him that described her "returning to her roots."
188	12	"Clair's Place"	John Bowab	Adriana Trigiani	December 19, 1991	0813	25.1	16.0/26
It's the Christmas season in the Huxtable household, but it will all have to happen without Clair. She is staying in the "Clair Hanks Huxtable Room" Cliff built for her, complete with private phone and secret security code access. As Cliff endeavors to learn the six-digit code "in case of emergencies," Clair says she will have to think it over. Family members who usually rely on Clair for everything must fend for themselves.
189	13	"Theo's Future"	Jay Sandrich	Story by : Hugh O'Neill; Teleplay by : Gordon Gartrelle & Janet Leahy & Hugh O'Neill	January 2, 1992	0814	24.8	16.1/25
Even with his job at the community center, making ends meet is still hard for Theo. So when Tim tells him about a corporate mixer, Theo heads over. Once there, he expresses his opinions about corporate image and employee management to corporate recruiters from a large soup company. Impressed, they offer to fly him to their San Francisco headquarters for an interview. But as Theo packs, his young friend Eugene wonders how Theo could consider a job in San Francisco over graduate school and the community center.
190	14	"The Price Is Wrong"	Malcolm-Jamal Warner	Gordon Gartrelle & Janet Leahy	January 9, 1992	0815	22.3	15.0/23
When a group of senior citizens complain of the higher prices and poorer quality at the supermarket chain store in their neighborhood, Pam drives them to the chain's store a few blocks away where the conditions are better. Incensed at the local supermarket's exploitive practices, Pam, Lance, and Charmaine organize the seniors to protest; armed with thousands of pennies, they create a log-jam at the checkout counter.
191	15	"Bring Me the Lip Gloss of Deirdre Arpelle"	John Bowab	Courtney Flavin	January 16, 1992	0816	24.1	15.5/24
Eager for extra cash, Pam fills in for Cliff's regular assistant. Everything is under control until Mrs. Minifield bypasses the hospital and arrives on Cliff's doorstep with contractions less than four minutes apart. Meanwhile, Kenny shows up to work on a school science project with Rudy and Stanley. Hoping to make Rudy jealous, Kenny has brought along his girlfriend of three days, Deirdre. Rudy sees through Kenny's plan, and so does Deirdre. Only after being abandoned by Deirdre does he realize that he actually likes her. Guest star: Ed Lover Note: This is the first appearance of Gabrielle Carmouche as Deirdre Arpelle. It is the fifth and final episode in which Phylicia Rashad did not appear.
192	16	"Eat, Drink and Be Wary"	Carl Lauten & Malcolm-Jamal Warner	Jill Condon & Leslie Strain	January 30, 1992	0726	23.1	15.0/24
Knowing Cliff's penchant for junk food, Clair searches Cliff's favorite hiding places for chips and cookies before she leaves for a business trip. All she finds are fruits, vegetables, and other healthful items. With the help of every condiment in the refrigerator, the girls manage to make palatable Cliff's dinner of boiled chicken, brown rice, and steamed broccoli. Later, Sondra intercepts a late-night delivery of Buffalo chicken wings, pizza, and ice cream. Guest star: Debbi Morgan Note: This episode was originally produced for season 7.
193	17	"The Getaway"	Chuck Vinson	Hugh O'Neill	February 6, 1992	0817	25.5	16.4/25
Clair reports that Sondra, Elvin, and family are finally ready to move out. While Elvin and Sondra supervise the unloading in New Jersey, Winnie and Nelson remain under the supervision of Cliff, who would rather take a nap. A game of hide-and-seek ensues and Cliff knocks over the grandfather clock, breaking it. Elvin then returns to explain to Cliff that now he and Sondra have moved to New Jersey, Elvin's family needs a second car – Cliff's station wagon. Guest stars: Former NCAA basketball coaches and then-current ESPN announcers Jim Valvano and Dick Vitale
194	18	"Cliff Gets Jilted"	John Bowab	Stuart Silverman	February 6, 1992	0818	30.7	19.6/30
When their boiler expires, Sondra and Elvin move their housewarming party to the Huxtable house. Russell arrives with a rumor that, supposedly, Vanessa and Dabnis have finally set a wedding date. But then Vanessa announces that she and Dabnis have mutually agreed to separate.
195	19	"Cliff and Theo Come Clean"	John Bowab	Adriana Trigiani	February 13, 1992	0819	21.4	13.9/21
Preparing for a school project, Olivia seeks out a more reliable source after Cliff tells her outrageous stories about himself at age six. Olivia talks to Russell, who relates some interesting (and true) stories about the young Cliff that even Cliff has forgotten. Meanwhile, Theo's students at the community center thrash out the moral and ethical dilemma presented by their discovery of a monogrammed money clip containing $600 in cash. Note: This is the last appearance of Eugene Byrd as Eugene.
196	20	"Clair's Reunion"	Carl Lauten & Anne-Louise Wallace	Marcia L. Leslie	February 20, 1992	0820	19.3	13.2/20
Clair hosts a group of Hillman College alumnae who have gathered to plan a testimonial for a much-loved professor. While trying to come up with a way to describe the colorful woman, Clair and her friends reminisce about their fun-filled college days. Meanwhile, Olivia persuades Cliff to get a beauty makeover in her new makeshift hair salon. Guest stars: Margaret Avery, CCH Pounder, and Daphne Maxwell Reid
197	21	"Rudy's Retreat"	Carl Lauten & Maynard C. Virgil I	Lisa S. Benjamin & Nina Combs	February 27, 1992	0821	22.5	15.0/24
Sondra and Elvin want to provide for the twins in their will. After seeing a lawyer to draw up a will, they narrow the field of candidates for guardianship of the twins to Cliff, Clair, and Theo. After Rudy oversteps her bounds and Clair reminds her who's in charge, Rudy turns sullen and surly. Note: Karen Malina White and Allen Payne appear on an episode of A Different World that aired later that evening. In the fall of 1992, White became a regular cast member of that series.
198	22	"You Can't Stop the Music"	Alan Smithee	Gardenia Gabrielle & Ben Gramin	March 26, 1992	0811	19.6	13.6/22
While Clair provides some last-minute legal aid for a public radio station, Cliff finds himself sitting in on a live radio broadcast with Latin Jazz stars Graciela, Willie Colón, and Mario Bauzá and his Afro-Cuban Jazz Orchestra. Meanwhile, Kenny gets his first job, babysitting Olivia. Note: "Alan Smithee" is a pseudonym used to hide the identity of a director.
199	23	"Some Gifts Aren't Deductible"	John Bowab	Courtney Flavin	April 23, 1992	0822	17.2	11.9/21
In her annual plea, Clair begs Cliff to just hand over his receipts and let her and the accountant work out the tax return. But Cliff wants to stake his claims first – to Elvin, Sondra, the twins, Olivia, and Pam as Huxtable dependents. Caught without an appropriate gift for Deirdre's birthday, Kenny tells her he has planned a party for her at the Huxtables. When Deirdre realizes the party was planned last-minute, she dumps Kenny forever. Desperately, Kenny appeals to Stanley for help. Stanley helps as he knows that unless he can convince Deirdre to take Kenny back, Rudy and Kenny may start developing feelings for each other. Note: This is the last appearance of Merlin Santana as Stanley and Gabrielle Carmouche as Deirdre. The Uptown String Quartet performs James Brown's "I Feel Good".
200	24	"And So We Commence"	Jay Sandrich	Courtney Flavin & Gordon Gartrelle & Janet Leahy & Hugh O'Neill	April 30, 1992	0823	44.4	28.0/45
201	25	"And So We Commence"	Jay Sandrich	Courtney Flavin & Gordon Gartrelle & Janet Leahy & Hugh O'Neill	April 30, 1992	0824	44.4	28.0/45
In the series finale, Cliff invites a long list of friends and relatives to Theo's graduation despite a scarcity of tickets, forcing Theo to scrounge up every spare ticket he can find. Denise calls from Singapore to tell the family that she and Martin are expecting a baby. Vanessa and Dabnis arrive, providing mixed signals to everyone about their current relationship. At the commencement ceremony, Cliff thinks back eight years to the day he used Monopoly money to illustrate the harsh realities of life to the then 14-year-old Theo. By the time Cliff emerges from his reverie, Theo is already a graduate. That evening, after the doorbell is finally fixed, Cliff and Clair dance intimately one last time in the Huxtable living room – and then dance off the set, walk past the audience, and leave the studio. This episode was immediately followed by a three-minute 'thank you' tribute from NBC. Note: The two-part series finale aired on the evening of day two of the 1992 Los Angeles riots. Bill Cosby appeared on KNBC in an attempt to end hostilities, asking viewers to stop what they were doing and instead watch the series finale of the show.
