= Pilot Presentation =

- The Cosby Show episode
- This father/son economic lesson-themed episode won the Comedy Writing Emmy Award. Cliff Huxtable, M.D. (Bill Cosby) and son Theo (Malcolm Jamal Warner) use Monopoly money for the lesson.
- Episode no.: Season 1 Episode 1
- Directed by: Jay Sandrich
- Written by: Ed. Weinberger; Michael J. Leeson
- Production code: 0101
- Original air date: September 20, 1984
- Running time: 23:40

Guest appearances
- Keith Reddin as Mr. McManis; Todd Hollowell as Denise's Date

Episode chronology
← Previous —	Next → "Goodbye Mr. Fish"

"Pilot Presentation" (also known as "Theo's Economic Lesson") is the pilot and first episode of the first season of the American sitcom The Cosby Show. "Pilot Presentation" originally aired in the United States on NBC on Thursday, September 20, 1984, at 8:00 PM ET. This episode debuted the week before the official start of the 1984–85 United States network television season. Cliff and Clair only have four children in this episode: Denise, Theo, Vanessa, and Rudy. Sondra, the firstborn, is introduced later in that season, episode 4. She is not in the featured nor mentioned in the intro. The confrontation with Theo in this episode is seen again as a flashback twice during the remainder of the series, in the Season 4 episode "Looking Back" and the series finale "And So We Commence." The episode was directed by Jay Sandrich and written by Ed. Weinberger and Michael J. Leeson. The episode was a critical and commercial success, achieving both high ratings and positive critical feedback.

== Plot ==
Clair Huxtable, an attorney, and her children are having dinner at home. Clair is upset with her son, Theo, due to the poor grades on his recent report card. His younger sister, Vanessa, tries to get Theo in trouble for throwing food at her. Clair’s husband, Dr. Clifford "Cliff" Huxtable, comes home from a long day at his job as a doctor of obstetrics and gynaecology just after the meal.

Cliff confronts Theo and asks how he plans to get into college with such low grades. Theo explains that he does not plan to go to college, but rather to get a job like "regular people" once he finishes high school. Cliff uses play money to demonstrate the expenses a "regular person" must face each month, giving Theo a monthly salary of $1,200 and taking money back for rent, taxes, food, and so forth. Even though Theo devises ways to save money, such as by using a motorcycle instead of a car, he finds himself broke at the end of the exercise.

Cliff also meets his daughter Denise's earring-wearing beau, a former United States Merchant Marine crewman who has served time in a Turkish prison. When Cliff tells her what time he expects her to arrive home and what attire she should wear, she scoffs at him because those rules only apply on school nights and it is Friday. Cliff counters by saying that since she went to school that day, he considers it to be a school night.

Theo urges Cliff to accept him for who he is and love him unconditionally, to which Cliff responds, "That's the dumbest thing I've ever heard in my life!" He berates Theo for being a lazy student and tells him to try as hard as he can in school, ending with this humorous threat: "I am your father. I brought you in this world, and I'll take you out!"

At the end of the day, Cliff and Clair settle into bed. As he becomes amorous, she reminds him that his activities are the reason they now have as many children as they do. This puts Cliff off for a few seconds. Vanessa and Rudy, the youngest child, then knock on the bedroom door because Rudy was scared of "the Wolf Man" in their closet. Clair invites the kids to sleep in the bed with her and Cliff.

== Cast ==
- Bill Cosby as Dr. Clifford "Cliff" Huxtable, OB-GYN (the only episode for which he was Clifford rather than Heathcliff)
- Phylicia Ayers-Allen as Clair Olivia Huxtable, Esq.
- Malcolm-Jamal Warner as Theodore Aloysius "Theo" Huxtable
- Keshia Knight Pulliam as Rudith Lillian "Rudy" Huxtable
- Tempestt Bledsoe as Vanessa Huxtable
- Lisa Bonet as Denise Huxtable

== Production ==
Nameplate outside of Cliff's office shown for six seconds of the first episode of The Cosby Show

Taping of the pilot took place in May 1984, prior to being green-lighted as a full series for the NBC fall schedule. Although this episode was written by Weinberger and Leeson, the headwriter for the series was Earl Pomerantz. The episode, which was filmed in two live performances, was based on Cosby's real life conversation with his son Ennis about "regular people", but included elements of Cosby's stand-up comedy routine. Rather than producing the show in Hollywood, the show was produced in New York City. During the 1983–84 United States television season, no sitcoms had finished in the top 10 in the rankings and only one new sitcom (AfterMASH) was renewed. As the networks battled to preempt each other's thunder for the 1984–85 United States television season, the Cosby Show became one of seven NBC shows (along with Punky Brewster, Miami Vice, Hunter, Highway to Heaven, Partners in Crime, Hot Pursuit) to debut prior to the September 24 date that marked the official beginning of the season. In the show, Bill Cosby is an obstetrician with his office located below his family's residence in a brownstone home. Less than three months before the show debuted, its producers had not yet decided whether the brownstone would be set in Brooklyn or Manhattan.

The set used for the pilot episode of The Cosby Show was notably different than the one used during the remainder of the series. In the first episode, the first floor has extra rooms that it does not have in the rest of the series. In the pilot, Cliff and Clair Huxtable have only four children. The fifth child, Sondra - who was the eldest child - was not introduced until the tenth episode of the first season, entitled "Bonjour, Sondra". Her being away at college is the reason given for her absence in the earlier part of the season. In this episode, the plaque outside Cliff's office lists his full first name as "Clifford." In the rest of the episodes, however, his name is Heathcliff.

== Reception ==
=== Ratings ===
Cosby was a three-time winner of the Primetime Emmy Award for Outstanding Lead Actor in a Drama Series, but Tom Selleck was the incumbent winner and Cosby has had three failed series since his success with I Spy. Cosby's sitcom was slotted against Selleck's Magnum, P.I., which had dominated the time slot for years. The show placed first in the Nielsen Media Research ratings for the week with a 21.6 million person viewership. This placed it ahead of runner-up 60 Minutes, which had an audience of 20.7 million. It was the most popular premier for NBC since the 1977 debut of What Really Happened to the Class of '65?.

=== Critical reviews ===
John J. O'Connor of The New York Times wrote that "With only the premiere to go on, The Cosby Show is by far the classiest and most entertaining new situation comedy of the season." After the pilot aired, David Bianculli wrote in the Sunday Philadelphia Inquirer that "This sitcom will lose to CBS's Magnum, P.I., but it's too funny, and Cosby is too good, for NBC to dump it." In a separate article in the same edition, he spoke more glowingly describing it as "the best TV sitcom since Cheers, and a good bet to become an instant classic. Cosby is delightful, and his series is both funny and intelligent." He also described the family as "amazingly real". According to Associated Press syndicated writer Jerry Buck, in the episode, "Cosby handles his son in a manner that is not only funny but intelligent." Mike Boone of The Gazette described Cosby and Ayers-Allen as "credible parents" and Cosby's fatherly advice as a "delightful confrontation". Boone also noted that "understanding the special world of children" has always been a part of Cosby's comedy, and that this was present in the comical scene where Cliff and Theo discuss serious matters using play money. Star-Banner said "The dialogue is typically Cosby — easy and funny — and you can just see yourself getting to like these people very much." According to Associated Press writer Fred Rothenberg, the response to the opening episode was glowing with the Los Angeles Times praising the show as "the best comedy of the fall season by a long, long, lonnnnnnng shot."; The New York Times saying "by far the classiest and most entertaining situation comedy."; and The Washington Post calling it "the best, funniest, most humane new show of the season." He also noted that marketing executives were not surprised at the reaction to the show.

=== Awards ===
Weinberger and Leeson won the Primetime Emmy Award for Outstanding Writing for a Comedy Series for this episode at the 37th Primetime Emmy Awards on September 22, 1985, where the series won three of its eight nominations. Jay Sandrich won the Directors Guild of America Award for Outstanding Directing – Comedy Series at the 37th Directors Guild of America Awards for this episode.
