= OK Garage =

- Movie Poster
- Directed by: Brandon Cole
- Written by: Brandon Cole
- Produced by: Matthaias Wendlandt; Moses Rothman
- Starring: John Turturro; Lili Taylor; Will Patton
- Cinematography: Rob Sweeney
- Edited by: Suzanne Pillsbury
- Music by: Evan Lurie
- Production company: Rialto Film
- Release date: 19 April 1998 (US)
- Running time: 90 minutes
- Country: United States
- Language: English

OK Garage (also known as All Revved Up) is a 1998 American comedy-drama film written and directed by Brandon Cole. The film won several awards at different film festivals. It premiered in the United States at the Los Angeles Independent Film Festival.

== Plot ==
A woman who gets swindled by a garage mechanic enlists her neighbor and his best friend in exacting some kind of revenge.

== Cast ==
- John Turturro as Jonny Candellano
- Lili Taylor as Rachel
- Will Patton as Sean
- Gemma Jones as Mrs. Wiggins
- Joseph Maher as Lilly
- Paul Calderón as Carl
- Aleta Mitchell as Louise
