= Aleta Mitchell =

American actress (1952–2026)

- Born: February 12, 1952; Chicago, Illinois, U.S.
- Died: April 14, 2026 (aged 74); Branford, Connecticut, U.S.
- Occupation: Actress
- Years active: 1984–2025

Sharon Aleta Haskell (February 12, 1952 – April 14, 2026), known professionally as Aleta Mitchell, was an American actress known for her appearances on Broadway, and in 1980s and 1990s films.

== Background ==
Sharon Aleta Haskell was born in Chicago, Illinois on February 12, 1952. She died in Branford, Connecticut on April 14, 2026, at the age of 74.

== Career ==
Theatre

On Broadway, Mitchell played Dussie Mae in Ma Rainey's Black Bottom at Cort Theatre (1984–1985). She also appeared in Off Broadway productions, with various roles in Distracted (Laura Pels Theatre), as Aunt Louise in Ohio State Murders (Duke on 42nd Street), and roles in the Young Playwrights Festival (Playwrights Horizons, 1993; Joseph Papp Public Theater, 1995). Regionally, she played Mrs. Dickson in Intimate Apparel at Westport Country Playhouse in 2014.

Television

In 1985, Mitchell guest starred as Mrs. Randall on the television series The Cosby Show in the season one episode "Physician of the Year." In 1989, she guest starred on the CBS action drama series The Equalizer as Martha Taylor, wife of Casey Taylor played by Laurence Fishburne in the season four episode, "Race Traitors." The Taylors are being terrorized by Dale Stevens (played by David Andrews), who is a KKK member trying to organize neighborhood skinheads into a larger network. During the 1990s Mitchell had three roles in the Law & Order franchise; Joanne Preston in the 1991 Law & Order episode "God Bless the Child," Phyllis Munroe in the 1992 Law & Order: Criminal Intent episode: "Bright Boy," and Helene Carter in the 1994 Law & Order episode "Second Opinion." She also played Angelique Guerrero in The Jury (2004).

Film

Mitchell's 1980s film roles include, Cara in No Mercy (1986), Celestine Durand in Wes Craven's horror The Serpent and the Rainbow (1988), and Victoire in Miloš Forman's romantic drama Valmont (1989). Her 1990s film roles include Sister Robin in Spike Lee's biographical drama Malcolm X (1992), and Alphabette in Clint Eastwood's crime drama Midnight in the Garden of Good and Evil (1997). She also played Louise in the 1998 film O.K. Garage (also known as All Revved Up).

== Filmography ==
Aleta Mitchell film and television credits
Year	Title	Role	Notes	Ref.
1985	The Cosby Show	Mrs. Randall	Episode: "Physician of the Year"	
1986	No Mercy	Cara	Film	
1988	The Serpent and the Rainbow	Celestine Durand	Film	
1989	The Equalizer	Martha Taylor	Episode: "Race Traitors"	
1989	Valmont	Victoire	Film	
1991	Law & Order	Joanne Preston	Episode: "God Bless the Child"	
1992	Malcolm X	Sister Robin	Film	
1994	Law & Order	Helene Carter	Episode: "Second Opinion"	
1997	Midnight in the Garden of Good and Evil	Alphabette	Film	
1998	O.K. Garage	Louise	Film. AKA All Revved Up	
2002	Law & Order: Criminal Intent	Phyllis Munroe	Episode: "Bright Boy"	
2004	The Jury	Angelique Guerrero	Episode: "Pilot" (S1.E8)	
