= Goodbye Mr. Fish =

- The Cosby Show episode
- The Huxtable family attends a bathroom funeral for Rudy's pet goldfish, Lamont.
- Episode no.: Season 1 Episode 2
- Directed by: Jay Sandrich
- Written by: Earl Pomerantz
- Production code: 0102
- Original air date: September 27, 1984
- Running time: 24:08

Episode chronology
← Previous "Pilot"	Next → "Bad Dreams"

"Goodbye Mr. Fish", or sometimes "Good-bye Mr. Fish", "Goodbye, Mr. Fish" or just "Mr. Fish", is the second episode of the first season of the American sitcom The Cosby Show. The episode was directed by Jay Sandrich and written by Earl Pomerantz. "Goodbye Mr. Fish" originally aired in the United States on NBC on Thursday September 27, 1984, at 8:00 PM Eastern time.

The episode focuses on the death of Rudy's pet goldfish, which was difficult to explain to her and difficult for her to deal with. The episode was a critical and commercial success, achieving both high ratings and positive critical feedback. Its viewer ratings placed it third for the opening week of the 1984–85 United States network television season and it earned Primetime Emmy Award and Writers Guild Award nominations for its writing.

Several critics either describe this as the most memorable episode of the series or mention it first when describing the series' memorable episodes. Other critics as well as Bill Cosby include it on short lists of series highlights. Clips of this episode are included in the season 4 two-part "Looking Back" episode.

== Plot ==
Cliff (Bill Cosby) comes home from a long day at work and tries to take a nap. Vanessa (Tempestt Bledsoe) disturbs him to say that Rudy's (Keshia Knight Pulliam) goldfish, Lamont, has died, but she does not realize it yet. They have a hard time explaining to Rudy what has happened. Once they do, Rudy becomes depressed. Later that day, the older kids start making fun of Lamont's death, Theo saying they should hold a memorial service for the fish around the family toilet. When Cliff feels that the rest of the family is insensitive to Rudy's loss, he requires the entire family to participate in a memorial service for Lamont in the bathroom in proper funeral attire. Rudy loses interest in the funeral and leaves to watch television, ending the ceremony abruptly. She later returns to the bathroom and asks for privacy, not because she wants to say goodbye to Lamont as Cliff thinks, but because she needs to use the toilet.

== Cast ==
- Bill Cosby as Cliff Huxtable
- Phylicia Ayers-Allen as Clair Huxtable
- Malcolm-Jamal Warner as Theo Huxtable
- Keshia Knight Pulliam as Rudy Huxtable
- Tempestt Bledsoe as Vanessa Huxtable
- Lisa Bonet as Denise Huxtable

== Production ==
This was first episode taped and produced for the show, on August 1, 1984, following the "Pilot" taped much earlier in May 1984. The show originated at the NBC studio in Brooklyn before a live studio audience with six different sets: a living room, a master bedroom, a kitchen, a child's bedroom, a hallway, and a bathroom. The taping endured so many retakes that it took three times as long as was scheduled. The set used was notably different from the one used during the pilot. In the first episode, the first floor has extra rooms that it does not have in the rest of the series, beginning with this episode. As of 1987, this was one of the few sitcom episodes that showed the bathroom, according to Patricia Leigh Brown of The New York Times.

== Reception ==
In 2009, TV Guide created TV Guide's 100 Greatest Episodes of All-Time, with this episode ranked number 15. Earl Pomerantz was nominated for the Writers Guild of America Award for Best Screenplay - Episodic Comedy and the Primetime Emmy Award for Outstanding Writing for a Comedy Series for this episode. The episode was also nominated for an Emmy in the category of Outstanding Live and Tape Sound Mixing and Sound Effects for a Series. The episode finished third in the Nielsen Media Research ratings for the week with a 19.1 million person viewership and a 22.5 share for the week ending September 30 behind Dallas (22.4 million) and Falcon Crest (19.8 million). This followed a first-place ranking for the "Pilot" the week before. This was the first episode of the series to air after the September 24 date that marked the official beginning of the 1984–85 United States network television season.

David Hinckley of the Daily News describes Rudy as "impossibly cute" in this episode. Producer Marcy Carsey considered the episode to be an example of how the series dealt with the "reactions to small-scale events". According to Lisa Schwarzbaum of Entertainment Weekly, this is considered by many to be the most memorable episode of the series. Other critics consider it to be among the highlights of the series including Allison Samuels of Newsweek who remembered Cosby for two performances in the series in which he "hid his potato-chip habit from his wife and delivered a deadpan eulogy as he flushed his daughter's goldfish down the toilet". William Raspberry of The Washington Post and Graham Jefferson of USA Today considered the episode to be a highlight of the series. Cosby was quoted in Ebony as counting the episode on the short list of highlights from the series. This was the first episode mentioned by several writers discussing the series, including Renee Graham of the Boston Globe, Matt Roush of USA Today (in 1987 after the first 81 episodes), and Candace Murphy of the Oakland Tribune. In the fourth season two-part November 12, 1987 "Looking Back" episode, the family tries to help the newlywed Sondra Huxtable and Elvin reconcile after their first fight. The episode recounts highlights of the first 81 episodes to help Elvin understand Sondra and her family and this episode is highlighted. According to TBS, the following lines in the funeral part of the script were among the most memorable in the entire series:

Cliff: "We're here to say goodbye to a cherished friend: Lamont, the goldfish."
Vanessa: "I always felt safe with him around."
