= What Planet Are You From? =

2000 film by Mike Nichols

- Theatrical release poster
- Directed by: Mike Nichols
- Screenplay by: Michael Leeson; Garry Shandling; Ed Solomon; Peter Tolan
- Story by: Michael Leeson; Garry Shandling
- Produced by: Neil Machlis; Mike Nichols; Garry Shandling
- Starring: Garry Shandling; Annette Bening; Greg Kinnear; Ben Kingsley; Linda Fiorentino; John Goodman
- Cinematography: Michael Ballhaus
- Edited by: Richard Marks
- Music by: Carter Burwell
- Production companies: Brillstein-Grey Entertainment; Columbia Pictures
- Distributed by: Sony Pictures Releasing
- Release date: March 3, 2000
- Running time: 105 minutes
- Country: United States
- Language: English
- Budget: $55–75 million
- Box office: $14.1 million

What Planet Are You From? is a 2000 American science fiction comedy film directed by Mike Nichols and written by Michael Leeson, Garry Shandling, Ed Solomon, and Peter Tolan based on a story by Leeson and Shandling. The film stars Shandling, Annette Bening, Greg Kinnear, Ben Kingsley, Linda Fiorentino, and John Goodman.

== Plot ==
A denizen of a faraway planet occupied only by highly evolved males is ordered by his superior, Graydon, to find a female human, impregnate her and bring the baby back to the planet.

The visitor to Earth ends up in Phoenix, Arizona, where he assumes the name Harold Anderson and takes a job in a bank. There he meets a womanizing co-worker, Perry Gordon, who goes to Alcoholics Anonymous meetings strictly to meet women. Harold accompanies him to one and meets Susan Hart, a recovering alcoholic.

He must marry her before he can try to mate. After their wedding in Las Vegas, Susan finds herself wildly satisfied by Harold, even though men from his planet have no genitals and he has been equipped for his Earth visit with a penis that makes a loud whirring sound whenever he gets an erection.

Harold and Susan have a difficult time conceiving a baby. Meanwhile, Roland Jones, an employee of the FAA who learned of Harold's odd behavior on an airplane, has become obsessed with proving him to be an alien and being the first one to find him.

When the child is born, Harold, following orders, abandons his wife and returns to his planet, but his sadness over hurting Susan leaves him with guilt and second thoughts even though people from his world theoretically have no emotions, so against the wishes of Graydon, he returns the baby to Susan and tells her the truth. Susan is angry, grateful, and completely disbelieving. Harold offers to prove that he is in fact an alien and does so just as Roland arrives, viewing Harold's "act of proof" through the window. Instead of forgiving him and welcoming him back into their relationship, Susan breaks down in tears, saying, "I thought I had things right but then I married an alien!" Harold leaves.

Once outside, Harold sees Roland, who is delighted to know he was right all along about Harold being an alien. Roland implores Harold to come with him and admit this to his wife, who doesn't believe him about Harold. Harold charitably agrees, but before that can happen, Graydon shows up with a phaser. Holding Harold at gunpoint, he declares he's taking Harold back. Roland pulls his gun on the leader, who brags, "none of your primitive weapons can hurt me, and I can heal instantly from anything," and shoots him in the chest. Graydon falls dead into the fountain.

Susan comes outside and says she thinks they should try to patch things up after all. Roland happily walks off with Graydon's alien body. Susan and Harold retake their vows in the wedding she says she always wanted. On the drive home, he tells her that the citizens of his planet want him to take over as leader. They discuss it, but she doesn't want to move since all her friends are here, and she knows nothing about the school system there. Harold grudgingly agrees to make the very long commute.

== Cast ==
- Garry Shandling as Harold Anderson
- Annette Bening as Susan Hart Anderson
- Greg Kinnear as Perry Gordon
- Ben Kingsley as Graydon
- Linda Fiorentino as Helen Gordon
- John Goodman as Roland Jones
- Richard Jenkins as Don Fisk
- Caroline Aaron as Nadine Jones
- Judy Greer as Rebecca
- Nora Dunn as Madeline
- Ann Cusack as Liz
- Camryn Manheim as Alison
- Danny Zorn as Randy
- Harmony Smith as Rita
- Cricky Long as Janice
- Phill Lewis as Other MD
- Janeane Garofalo as Upset Airline Passenger
- Octavia Spencer as Baby Nurse

== Production ==
Shandling set up the film while starring in HBO's The Larry Sanders Show, with initial drafts written by Ed Solomon and Michael Leeson before a rewrite was performed by Shandling and his former Sanders producer Peter Tolan.

In December 1998, it was announced Mike Nichols had entered negotiations to direct the film.

== Release ==
What Planet Are You From? opened theatrically on March 3, 2000, in 2,248 venues in the United States and Canada, grossing $3,008,746 in its first weekend and ranking fourteenth at the US box office. The film ended its run having grossed $6,291,602 in the United States and Canada and $7,854,075 overseas for a worldwide total of $14,145,677. With a budget of between $55 million and $75 million, the film was a box office bomb.

== Reception ==
The film holds a 41% score on Rotten Tomatoes based on 76 reviews and average rating of 5.00/10. The site's consensus states: "Though What Planet Are You From? has some laughs, it's too inconsistent and bland for critics to give it their recommendations." Metacritic reports a 41 out of 100 rating based on 32 critics, indicating "mixed or average reviews". Audiences polled by CinemaScore gave the film a grade "C+" on a scale of A to F.
