= Funeral Procession (painting) =

Painting by Ellis Wilson

- Funeral Procession by Ellis Wilson
- Artist: Ellis Wilson
- Year: c. 1950
- Location: Amistad Research Center, New Orleans

Funeral Procession is the name of a painting by Ellis Wilson, which went from obscurity to notoriety in 1986, when it was featured heavily in the episode "The Auction" of the TV series The Cosby Show's second season. In the episode, Clair Huxtable states that Wilson was her great-uncle, and that her grandmother had owned the painting until she had to sell it in order to pay her medical bills. After discovering that it is being sold at auction, she places an $11,000 winning bid and her husband Cliff hangs it over the fireplace in the family living room, where it stays for the remainder of the eight-season series.

In 2025, a copy of the painting was prominently displayed in the Broadway play Purpose, directed by Phylicia Rashad (who played Clair Huxtable).

The actual painting is displayed as part of the Aaron Douglas Collection at the Amistad Research Center at Tulane University in New Orleans, Louisiana. Ellis Wilson was born on April 20, 1899, in Mayfield, Kentucky, and died on either January 1 or 2, 1977. The most he ever got for one of his paintings was about $300.
