= Ellis Wilson =

American painter (1899–1977)

- Portrait of Ellis Wilson, 1959, by Carl Van Vechten
- Born: April 20, 1899; Mayfield, Kentucky
- Died: January 2, 1977 (aged 77); Manhattan, New York
- Education: Kentucky State College
- Alma mater: Chicago Art Institute
- Awards: Guggenheim Fellowship

Ellis Wilson (20 April 1899 – 2 January 1977) was an African-American artist associated with the Harlem Renaissance.

== Biography ==
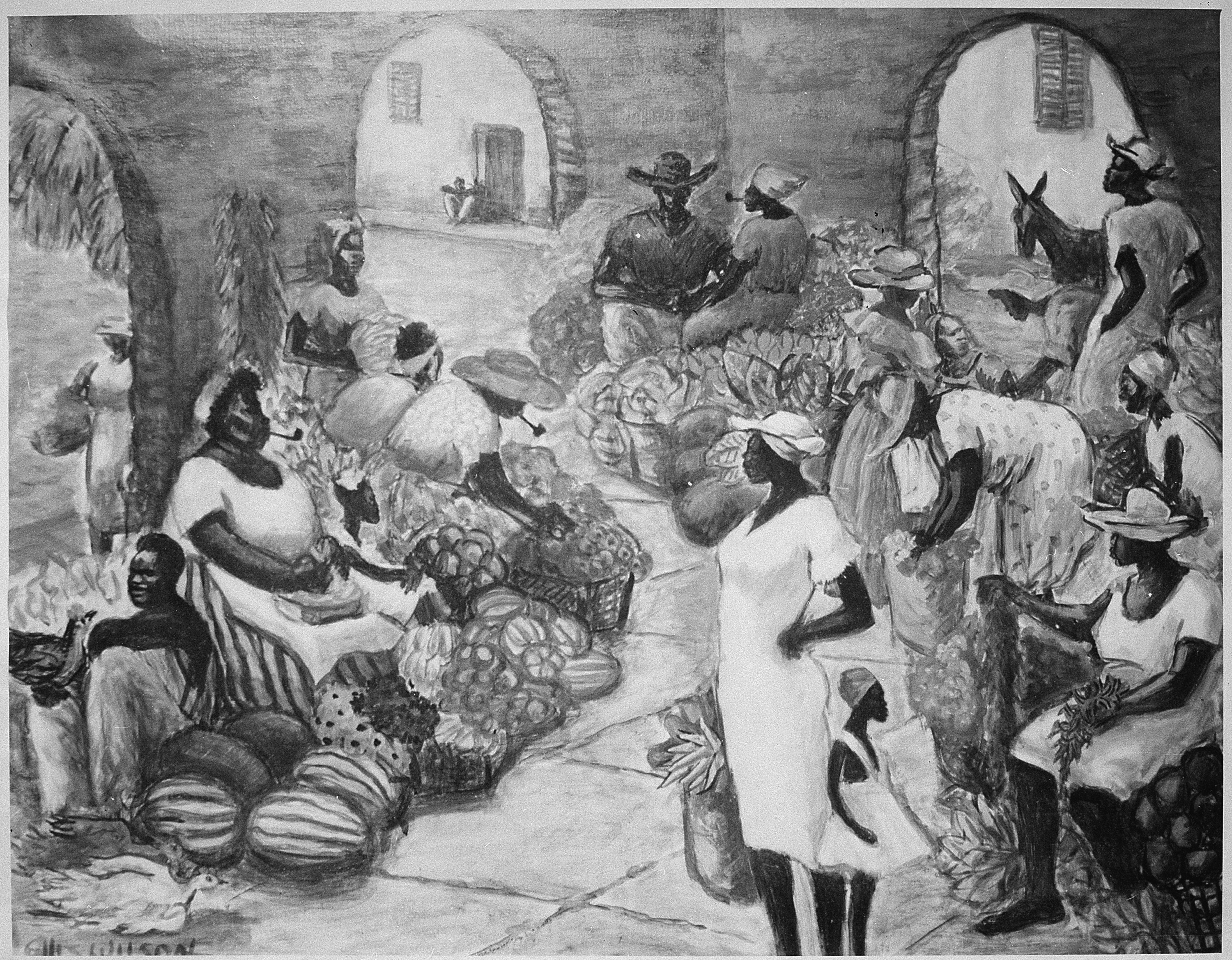
Old Charleston Market

=== Early life ===
Wilson was born in 1899 in Mayfield, Kentucky. Born to Frank and Minnie Wilson. His father was a barber and amateur painter. Wilson attended the Mayfield Colored Grade School. He later attended the Kentucky Normal and Industrial Institute in Frankfort for two years, but was only allowed to take courses in agriculture and education. Interested in studying art, Wilson left school at 19 and moved to Chicago where he studied at the School of the Art Institute of Chicago. He completed his art studies in 1923 and lived in Chicago for the next five years, seeking work as a commercial artist. While in Chicago, he became well acquainted with other Harlem Renaissance artists like sculptor Richmond Barthé and poet Gwendolyn Brooks.

=== Harlem Renaissance and after ===
Wilson moved to Harlem, New York from Chicago after hearing Alain Locke speak at a Chicago art exhibition titled "The Negro in Art Week" in 1927. Wilson moved the following year where he joined the Harlem Artists Guild and worked at a brokerage house. When Ellis first arrived in New York, black artists could not exhibit their work in mainstream galleries. He became an active member of the Harlem Renaissance, a collaborative effort to promote and exhibit the work of black artists. Ellis participated in many of the exhibitions associated with the movement. Wilson worked for the Federal Art Project from 1935 to 1940. He was also commissioned to create triptychs for US Army and Navy chaplains. In 1944 he was awarded a Guggenheim Fellowship and subsequently travelled through the southern United States. Wilson was very interested in Haiti and visited the country after receiving an award from the Terry Art Institute in 1952. His fondness for the country and its people is reflected in the vitality of paintings during that time period. Wilson is most noted for his paintings of Haitian people and culture.

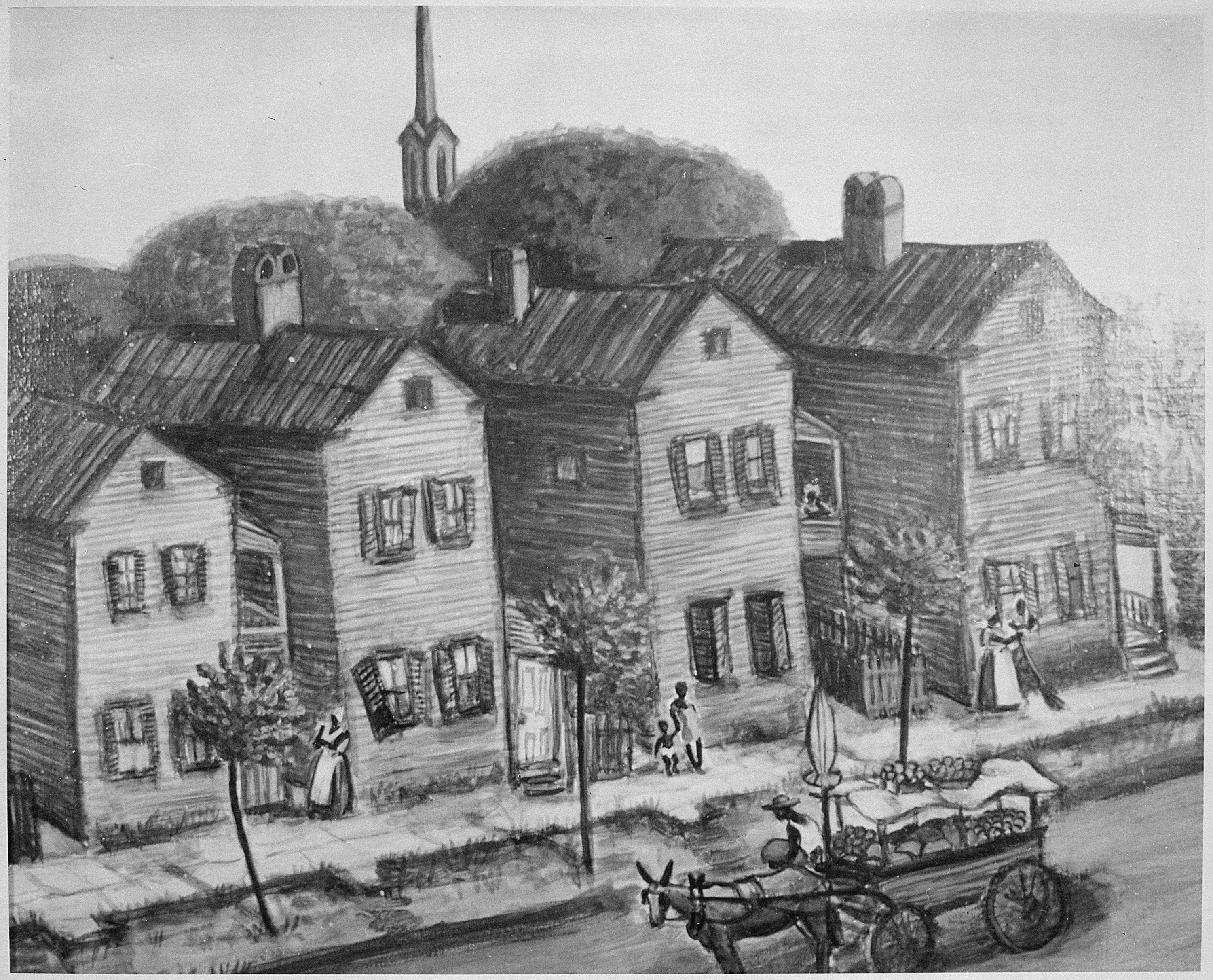
Old Charleston Houses

According to artist, Samella Lewis, "Wilson always produced fully accomplished and sophisticated design patterns...Making bold use of color, his paintings reflect a coherent and personal style that combines aspects of Expressionism with contemporary Realism. His vigorous distortion of form, one of the aspects of Expressionism, is evident in such compositions as Bird Vendor. Although Wilson had several exhibitions and won several prizes for his paintings he never became wealthy.

=== Death ===
As a resident at the Cornish Arms Home for Adults, he died in French Hospital on Sunday, January 2, 1977 at the age of 77, after a two-week-long illness, and was buried in a pauper's grave. The exact site of his grave is unknown.

=== In pop culture ===
Ellis Wilson's painting Funeral Procession was featured in the American television NBC sitcom The Cosby Show, in Season 2, "The Auction". In this episode, Clair Huxtable, played by Phylicia Rashad, bids on the painting by her great-uncle (Ellis Wilson) and she wins the auction. The painting then remains in the Huxtable living-room throughout the series.
