= Michael J. Leeson =

American screenwriter

- Born: Michael Jon Leeson; 1947
- Died: July 27, 2016 (aged 69)
- Occupation: Screenwriter

Michael Jon Leeson (1947 – July 27, 2016) was an American screenwriter.

== Filmography ==
- Love, American Style (1972–1973) (TV)
- All in the Family (1973) (TV)
- The Partridge Family (1973–1974) (TV)
- The Odd Couple (1972–1974) (TV)
- Happy Days (1974) (TV)
- The Mary Tyler Moore Show (1975) (TV)
- Phyllis (1975–1976) (TV)
- Rhoda (1975–1976) (TV)
- Mixed Nuts (1977) (TV)
- Fast Lane Blues (1978) (TV)
- The Associates (1979) (TV)
- Taxi (1978–1980) (TV)
- Best of the West (1981) (TV)
- Jekyll and Hyde... Together Again (with Monica Johnson, Harvey Miller and Jerry Belson) (1982)
- The Survivors (1983)
- When Your Lover Leaves (1983) (TV)
- The Tracey Ullman Show (1987) (TV)
- I Married Dora (1987–1988) (TV)
- The War of the Roses (1989)
- Grand (1990) (TV)
- Davis Rules (1992) (TV)
- The Cosby Show (1984–1992) (TV)
- I.Q. (with Andy Breckman) (1994)
- What Planet Are You From? (with Garry Shandling) (2000)
- The Tuxedo (2002)
- Twenty Good Years (2006) (TV)
- The Bill Engvall Show (2007–2009) (TV)

== Accolades ==
Year	Association	Category	Work	Result
1979	Primetime Emmy Awards	Outstanding Writing for a Comedy or Comedy-Variety or Music Series	Taxi: "Blind Date"	Nominated
1979	Humanitas Prize	30 Minute Network or Syndicated Television	Taxi: "Blind Date"	Won
1979	Writers Guild of America Awards	Episodic Comedy	Taxi: "Blind Date"	Nominated
1980	Primetime Emmy Awards	Outstanding Writing for a Comedy Series	The Associates: "The First Day"	Nominated
1981	Primetime Emmy Awards	Outstanding Writing for a Comedy Series	Taxi: "Tony's Sister and Jim"	Won
1982	Writers Guild of America Awards	Episodic Comedy	Taxi: "Tony's Sister and Jim"	Nominated
1985	Primetime Emmy Awards	Outstanding Writing for a Comedy Series	The Cosby Show: "Pilot"	Won
1990	BMI Film & TV Awards		Grand	Won
1991	British Academy of Film and Television Arts	Best Adapted Screenplay	The War of the Roses	Nominated
