= Gary Kott =

American dramatist

Gary Kott is an American television and advertising writer and artist.

He has five pieces of his artwork, three paintings and two sculptures, held over at Smith Vargas Fine Art in Palm Springs after a successful featured-artist show there in January, 2016. His painting "Veer" has been selected by the Palm Springs Art Museum Artists Council/University of California, Riverside for a show running from March 3 through April 22, 2016. Kott's artwork has been selected for viewing at the Rancho Mirage Artists Studio Tour to be held on March 19, 2016. His recent solo show at the Cathedral City Chamber of Commerce ran for three months. Kott's "Think Stripe" show at his studio/gallery was attended by more than 150 people.

A writer and supervising producer of The Cosby Show, Kott worked on the program during its five consecutive years of number one Nielsen ratings.

== Early life and education ==
Raised in Cranford, New Jersey, Kott graduated in 1965 from Cranford High School.

== Career ==
Kott worked on Madison Avenue in the early 1970s, writing and producing dozens of national television commercials and print ads. He was a copywriter at Ogilvy & Mather, moved to Young & Rubicam, then moved back to Ogilvy & Mather, where he served as Vice President and Creative Director.

=== Hollywood ===
In addition to his time working on The Cosby Show, Kott has also written for other shows, including The White Shadow, Fame, Remington Steele and Punky Brewster. He has received numerous accolades, including a Peabody Award, a Writers Guild of America Award, a People's Choice Award, an NAACP Image Award, a pair of Humanitas nominations, and one Emmy Award nomination. Kott has been a guest speaker at the Museum of Broadcasting in New York and the Smithsonian Institution in Washington, DC.

=== Theater ===
Kott has written numerous plays, with performances at The Actors Studio in New York, The Grove Street Playhouse and The Santa Monica Playhouse.

=== Gary Kott's Creative Warehouse ===
In 2011, Kott launched Gary Kott's Creative Warehouse, a website devoted to collecting his work, including art, stories and plays. In addition to writing a series of blog entries on the site, Kott has also introduced the concept of the "Storynar," a live webcast of the reading of an original story.
