= List of A Different World episodes =

A Different World is a television spin-off of The Cosby Show set at Hillman College, the alma mater of Clair and Dr. Heathcliff Huxtable. It ran for six seasons on NBC, airing a total of 141 episodes, including three hour-long episodes. The last three episodes aired in syndication, bringing the total to 144.

== Series overview ==
| Season | Episodes | Originally released | | Rank | Rating |
| Season | Episodes | First released | Last released | Rank | Rating |
|---|---|---|---|---|---|
| 1 | 22 | September 24, 1987 | July 7, 1988 | 2 | 25.0 |
| 2 | 22 | October 6, 1988 | May 4, 1989 | 3 | 23.0 |
| 3 | 25 | September 28, 1989 | May 3, 1990 | 4 | 21.1 |
| 4 | 25 | September 20, 1990 | May 2, 1991 | 4 | 17.5 |
| 5 | 25 | September 19, 1991 | May 14, 1992 | 17 | 15.2 |
| 6 | 25 | September 24, 1992 | July 9, 1993 | 71 | 9.6 |

== Episodes ==
=== Season 1 (1987–88) ===
| No. overall | No. in season | Title | Directed by | Written by | Original release date | Prod. code | Rating/share (households) |
|---|---|---|---|---|---|---|---|
| 1 | 1 | "Reconcilable Differences" | Ellen Falcon | Lissa Levin & Thad Mumford | September 24, 1987 | 105 | 31.3/49 |
Denise Huxtable begins her sophomore year at Hillman and moves into Gilbert Hall. She meets her roommate, Jaleesa Vinson, a 26-year-old divorcée who is subject of much rumor and innuendo. Denise feels uneasy around Jaleesa and asks Stevie Rallen, the resident director, to find her a new room. Denise decides to try harder to get along with Jaleesa, but Jaleesa is offended that Denise has gone behind her back. They get into an argument, and Denise moves in with wealthy Whitley Gilbert (for whose family the dormitory is named). Whitley drives Denise insane with her idiosyncrasies and generally self-absorbed behavior. Denise apologizes to Jaleesa and asks for another chance, and Jaleesa agrees to stop being so defensive. Meanwhile, overeager freshman Dwayne Wayne hits on every woman in sight. Notes: This episode was taped after the second (and official) pilot episode to add additional characters and provide background for those in the pilot episode. Marisa Tomei does not appear.
| 2 | 2 | "Pilot" | Jay Sandrich | John Markus & Carmen Finestra & Matt Williams | October 1, 1987 | 101 | 28.2/45 |
Jaleesa and Denise get a new roommate, talkative transfer student Maggie Lauten. Denise learns that the check for her dorm fees has bounced. To make matters worse, she had also covered Jaleesa's fees to repay her for an earlier favor. Denise and Jaleesa face eviction unless they can come up with 200 dollars by the next day. Denise cannot bring herself to ask her parents for help, as she is tired of being bailed out. When the dean of students realizes that Denise sincerely wants to take responsibility for her actions, he helps her get a cafeteria job with an advance on her salary. Jaleesa takes delight in the fact that she is now Denise's boss. Guest star: Bill Cosby and Keshia Knight Pulliam Notes: This episode is the second pilot produced for the show. The original pilot was filmed and scrapped. Also, "The Pit" (the on-campus restaurant) makes its first appearance in this episode with a slightly different design. The Pit also showcases a more racially diverse student body at Hillman than would be seen in later seasons.
| 3 | 3 | "Porky de Bergerac" | Ellen Falcon | Susan Fales | October 15, 1987 | 106 | 26.7/43 |
Denise and Maggie convince Jaleesa to run for dorm monitor to prevent Whitley from getting the position. As one of her campaign promises, Jaleesa vows to address the dorm's litter problem by forcing anyone who fails to pick up after herself to wear a pig nose for a day. Denise leaves pizza in the lounge overnight, and Jaleesa orders her to wear the nose. Denise is furious, as she has a date with a cute guy from her biology class that night. They have never talked in person (she asked him out over the phone), so she decides to postpone the date because she does not want to meet him under these circumstances. Dwayne fails to get a hold of the guy as promised, but Michael still wants to go out with Denise. He even dons a pig nose so that she will not feel self-conscious. Note: First recurring appearances of Kim Wayans (Alison) and Bee-Bee Smith (Gloria).
| 4 | 4 | "Those Who Can't...Tutor" | Kim Friedman | Susan Fales | October 22, 1987 | 108 | 23.4/35 |
Dwayne offers to tutor Denise in calculus after she receives a D on a test. Denise believes that it is a scam, but Dwayne turns out to be an excellent tutor. They study for so long that Dwayne gets locked inside the dorm after curfew. He sneaks into Whitley's room while she is sleeping and climbs out the window. Stevie catches Dwayne coming down the fire escape, and Whitley suffers tremendous damage to her reputation. Dwayne refuses to tell the truth because he fears that Denise could be suspended. Stevies believes that Dwayne and Whitley are lying, and plans to report them to the dean. Denise interrupts and explains what really happened. Note: First appearances of Darryl M. Bell (Ron) and Sinbad (Walter).
| 5 | 5 | "War of the Words" | Ellen Falcon | Joe Gannon | October 29, 1987 | 111 | 27.7/43 |
Maggie prepares to debate Whitley on the topic of whether women can balance a career and family life. She is distracted by a surprise visit from her boyfriend, Mike, who stuns her by revealing that he has left school to take a job with the National Pork Council. He asks Maggie to transfer to a school in Washington, D.C. to be near him and proposes marriage. Maggie is so overwhelmed by her relationship crisis that Denise must take her place in the middle of the debate. She wins easily by detailing how her parents have employed a compromise to make their situation work. Maggie and Mike take her words to heart and decide to slow down their relationship. Meanwhile, Dwayne tries to get a permanent spot on campus radio after successfully filling in for an ailing disc jockey. Guest stars: Damon Wayans and Keenen Ivory Wayans Note: First appearance of Marie-Alise Recasner as recurring character Millie
| 6 | 6 | "Rudy and the Snow Queen" | Ellen Falcon | Cheryl Gard | November 5, 1987 | 112 | 29.7/45 |
Denise's little sister Rudy comes to visit for the weekend. She surprises Denise by immediately hitting it off with Whitley. When Denise and Rudy find it impossible to sleep in the same bed, Whitley allows Rudy to stay in her room. Whitley teaches Rudy all of her beauty secrets, and the two become good friends. Rudy hurts Denise's feelings by spending all of her time with Whitley. Meanwhile, Jaleesa fears the worst after hearing that her sister went to dinner with Jaleesa's ex-husband. Jaleesa clears up the situation, then asks Whitley to stop monopolizing Rudy's time. Whitley tells Rudy a bedtime story about two sisters and a snow queen. Rudy understands the moral of the story and agrees to pay more attention to Denise. Guest stars: Bill Cosby and Keshia Knight Pulliam
| 7 | 7 | "Sometimes You Get the Bear...Sometimes the Bear Gets You" | Ellen Falcon | Thad Mumford | November 19, 1987 | 109 | 28.2/43 |
Denise is apprehensive about a visit from her grandfather, as she fears that she cannot live up to his expectations. Jaleesa and Maggie ask Denise to take part in a traditional homecoming prank by stealing the head of the rival's mascot's bear costume. (They would be the first women in Hillman history to accomplish this). Denise initially turns them down because she does not want to disappoint her grandfather. She does not realize that Russell tried to steal the bear head in 1935, but was bested by a friend. He is still bitter about this and bets his friend that he can pull off the feat. Denise decides to help her roommates after Whitley angers her by belittling the prank as "foolishness." Russell and the girls separately seek the assistance of Hillman mascot Dwayne, who distracts the guys assigned to guard the mascot. Denise and her grandfather simultaneously try to steal the mascot head; they realize they have misjudged each other. The girls leave the head in Whitley's bed as revenge. Guest star: Earle Hyman
| 8 | 8 | "If Chosen I May Not Run" | Ellen Falcon | Thad Mumford | December 3, 1987 | 102 | 24.9/38 |
Denise shows potential as a sprinter during P.E. class, and the track coach asks her to come out for the team. Her father is thrilled to have another Huxtable competing for Hillman, as he and his father both ran for school. Denise enjoys the attention she receives from her friends and other students, but cannot handle the grueling practices; in fact, the entire team feels this way. Maggie desperately tries to track down an economics book that she needs for a term paper. Guest star: Bill Cosby
| 9 | 9 | "Romancing Mr. Stone" | Ellen Falcon | Scott Spencer Gordon & David Felton | December 10, 1987 | 107 | 27.9/43 |
Many of the girls become smitten with Byron Walcott, their handsome new geology professor. Professor Walcott's knowledge and enthusiasm for geology inspire Denise to develop a fascination for the subject. Although Denise mocks the other girls for their crushes on the professor, she also mistakes his attention for romantic interest. Stevie confronts Professor Walcott and accuses him of leading his students on. Dwayne witnesses their argument and suspects that they like each other. Denise feels like a fool for misreading Professor Walcott's intentions but quickly gets over it. She plays matchmaker for Stevie and the professor. Maggie concludes that Americans require too much personal space; she gets on everyone's nerves by cutting down on her "body buffer zone." Guest star: David Alan Grier
| 10 | 10 | "Gift of the Magi" | Ellen Falcon | Susan Fales | December 17, 1987 | 113 | 26.9/42 |
Millie tells the other dorm residents that Whitley's parents are divorcing. Whitley tries to maintain a positive attitude and looks forward to spending the holidays with her father in Switzerland. Mr. Gilbert stuns Whitley by introducing his new, much younger girlfriend; and springs the news that she will be coming along on their trip. Denise helps the devastated Whitley cope with the situation and try to come to an understanding with Monica. Jaleesa and Maggie continually rag on the gifts from their "secret Santas," unaware that they have come from each other. Dwayne arranges to become Denise's secret Santa, even though he is not from her dorm. Dwayne's friend Ron helps with his plan to woo Denise by acting as her manservant for the week. Guest stars: Troy Beyer as Monica and Conroy Gedeon (as Whitley's father Mercer Gilbert)
| 11 | 11 | "Does He Or Doesn't He?" | Ellen Falcon | Thad Mumford | January 7, 1988 | 114 | 28.0/41 |
Dwayne annoys a graduate student with his stupid pick-up lines. She predicts that Dwayne would freak out if a woman actually responded to his advances, and decides to invite him to her apartment. Jaleesa takes a bet from the entire dorm on Dwayne's possible reaction. Denise feels that Dwayne to go to Peggy's apartment and win her over with his charm. Denise and Walter (Dwayne's resident director and P.E. teacher) try to convince Dwayne to be himself around women. Peggy realizes that Dwayne is a good guy and cannot follow through with the bet.
| 12 | 12 | "Advise and Descent" | Ellen Falcon | Cheryl Gard | January 14, 1988 | 115 | 27.2/41 |
Denise volunteers for peer counseling duty during finals week. She proves to be a very good counselor but uses the job as an excuse to put off a major history paper. Dwayne dislikes the head counselor, a laid-back surfer from California because he suspects that he will put the moves on Denise. Whitley panics about an upcoming botany final; she had assumed that Millie's notes would be enough to carry her through the test. Dwayne and Ron express their discontent when the girls neglect their appearance while cramming for exams. The girls respond by holding an impromptu pageant in the dorm lounge to select "Miss Ugly America." Guest star: Kristoff St. John as E.Z. Brooks
| 13 | 13 | "The Prime of Miss Lettie Bostic" | Ellen Falcon | Thad Mumford & Susan Fales | January 21, 1988 | 117 | 27.7/41 |
Jaleesa fills in as resident director after Stevie leaves the university to get married (to Professor Walcott?). The students attend a lecture by Lettie Bostic, a renowned world traveler. Lettie dropped out of Hillman and moved to Paris, where she kept company with Picasso and other artistic icons and even worked as a spy during World War II. She confesses that she still regrets quitting school, so the dean offers to give her credit for "life experience" if she takes over as Gilbert's resident director. During a dorm meeting, Lettie immediately rubs the girls the wrong way with her blunt comments. Jalessa, who is bitter about losing her leadership position, organizes a revolt in the hopes of driving Lettie away. Lettie covers for the girls when they break a television set, and both sides agree to be less abrasive. Guest star: Ron O'Neal as a Hillman faculty member; he would return for three guest spots as Whitley's father. Notes: This episode marks the first appearance of Mary Alice as Lettie. It is also explained that Stevie, the previous director of Gilbert Hall, left the position to get married.
| 14 | 14 | "Wild Child" | Ellen Falcon | David Felton | February 4, 1988 | 116 | 27.8/41 |
Denise befriends Cougar, an extremely intelligent and creative student from her philosophy class. Cougar asks Denise to sneak her into the dorm for the night, claiming that her roommate has been letting an annoying boyfriend sleepover. Although she is supposed to stay on the couch, Cougar tries to use Whitley's room while Whitley is in the infirmary receiving treatment for a sprained ankle. Cougar gets caught, and Denise lashes out at her. Cougar reveals that she is not really a student at Hillman. She is an orphan who has been homeless since age 15 and started showing up for classes to increase her education. Dwayne and Denise ask Lettie to lobby the dean to enroll Cougar on scholarship, but Cougar initially balks at taking the SAT. Guest stars: Katie Rich as Cougar and Raymond St. Jacques
| 15 | 15 | "Dr. Cupid" | Regge Life | Deanne Stillman | February 11, 1988 | 118 | 26.9/40 |
Dwayne tries to use his radio show to get Valentine's Day date. He invents a dream man named Darrell Walker in the hopes of eliciting attention from the ladies. Although everyone else realizes that Darrell is obviously Dwayne, Whitley decides to investigate. Ron and Millie hook up while serving as go-betweens. A long-lost flame surprises Lettie with a visit. The couple worked together to publish incendiary material about the South African government, but she rejected his marriage proposal because she could not sacrifice her dreams. Marcus leaves after an argument, but Denise gets him to come back by making a radio dedication in Lettie's name. Marcus explains to Lettie that he is not trying to win her back; he is happily married, and simply wanted to give her a photo of his daughter whom he named after Lettie.
| 16 | 16 | "The Show Must Go On" | Kim Friedman | Gary Dontzig & Steven Peterman | February 18, 1988 | 119 | 20.3/30 |
Denise and Whitley earn lead roles in Maggie's play, a bizarre (and painfully long) adaptation of the story of Adam and Eve. Denise and Whitley vie for the affections of their leading man, who seems to thrive from the attention. When the girls learn that Rick already has a girlfriend, they allow their anger to affect their performances. Although the play ends abruptly after Whitley tries to strangle Rick, Maggie still receives rave reviews. Meanwhile, Dwayne and Ron struggle to design the sets without exceeding their 35-dollar budget.
| 17 | 17 | "Mr. Hillman" | Matthew Diamond | Margo Kaufman | February 25, 1988 | 120 | 21.3/31 |
Whitley enters the Miss Hillman pageant in order to win the approval of her mother, a former pageant winner whom Whitley can never seem to please. Denise decides to fight the elitism of the pageant by convincing Dwayne to enter. The Gilbert Hall residents infuriate Whitley by backing Dwayne as their representative in Miss Hillman. A fraternity sponsors Whitley; its members, along with other students, constantly mock Dwayne and play cruel pranks on him. Ron and Walter encourage him to save face by dropping out of the pageant. Dwayne refuses and declares that the harassment he has received has prompted him to reconsider the way he treats women. Although Whitley receives more votes than Dwayne, she loses badly to another girl. Lettie and Denise recognize her disappointment and urge her to live her own life, without worrying about her mother's opinion.
| 18 | 18 | "Speech Therapy" | Ellen Falcon | Cheryl Gard | March 10, 1988 | 104 | 23.9/36 |
Jaleesa panics at the prospect of making a speech in front of her poetry class. The professor takes pity on her and allows her to substitute a paper for the speech, but suggests that she learn to take risks. Jaleesa stammers her way through the speech; Professor Foster congratulates her on her courage and gives her a B because her content offset the horrible presentation. Denise forgets to pay back some money she had borrowed from Maggie a month earlier. Instead of reminding Denise about the debt, Maggie privately obsesses over the matter. Whitley's humidifier breaks, and she cannot call a repairman without exposing the fact that she has an illegal appliance. Dwayne and Ron help her ship it out for repairs, only to get busted by Lettie. Lettie reveals that she knew about the device; it no longer worked because she had unplugged it. Guest star: Roscoe Lee Browne in his first appearance as Dr. Barnabus Foster, a character he originated on The Cosby Show.
| 19 | 19 | "Clair's Last Stand" | Tony Singletary | Thad Mumford | March 24, 1988 | 122 | 26.5/42 |
Maggie and Denise plan a summer vacation in Greece. Denise realizes that her parents may not allow her to go, let alone agree to finance the trip, because of her terrible grades. She plans to soften up her mother during a weekend visit. Clair arrives at Hillman on her own after Denise fails to pick her up on time, and Lettie unwittingly fills her in on the trip. Clair refuses to let Denise go to Greece. She and Cliff have decided to make Denise get a summer job, in the hopes that she might take her education seriously if she helps finance it. Denise believes that her parents consider her worthless, but Clair eases her mind. Jaleesa decides to join Maggie in Greece. Whitley fears that she will have to spend her birthday alone after Millie bails on her because of plans with Ron. She does not realize that Millie and Ron have thrown together a surprise party. Guest star: Phylicia Rashad
| 20 | 20 | "If Only for One Night" | Tony Singletary | Susan Fales | April 28, 1988 | 121 | 22.7/38 |
During the last week of school, Denise accepts a date with Dwayne. She insists that they are only going out as friends, although her roommates note that Dwayne believes otherwise. Dwayne gets reservations at an expensive Japanese restaurant but has to scramble for a way to pay for dinner after spending all his money on a suit. Whitley becomes despondent when she fails to get an internship in New York, as she must now spend her summer in Richmond with her judgemental mother. Whitley gives Dwayne forty dollars for dinner because she wants to find happiness. She shows up at the restaurant in the middle of the date and begins complaining about her problems. She shocks Denise and Dwayne with the revelation that she considers them her only true friends. Although Whitley offers to leave, Dwayne lets her cry on his shoulder and gives advice on how to deal with her mother. Denise is so touched by Dwayne's actions that she begins to see him in a new light. He reads her a poem he had written. Note: This episode was intended to be the season finale and was the last one filmed before Lisa Bonet left the show.
| 21 | 21 | "Come Back, Little Eggby" | Ellen Falcon | Scott Spencer Gordon | May 5, 1988 | 110 | 22.2/39 |
As a class assignment, Maggie and Dwayne must care for eggs as if they were children. Maggie becomes extremely wrapped up in the project, and nearly skips her volleyball game because she is worried about the egg. She finally allows Jaleesa to watch the egg, as she is already babysitting Stevie's son J.T. Jaleesa leaves Whitley in charge while she helps Denise find a calculator and the egg disappears. Maggie completely freaks out and puts up fliers around campus. Stevie reminds Maggie that the egg is not a child; she states that real parents can also make their share of mistakes. Although Stevie is a good mother, she once lost track of J.T. in a department store. They discover that J.T. liked the egg so much that he had taken it to his room. Note: This episode, postponed from earlier in the season, marks the last appearance of Loretta Devine in the series.
| 22 | 22 | "My Dinner with Theo" | Ellen Falcon | Scott Spencer Gordon | July 7, 1988 | 103 | 17.0/33 |
Denise becomes depressed about her grades. To take her mind off her troubles, she calls her brother Theo and asks him to visit for the weekend. Theo, a high school senior, is considering applying to Hillman. He quickly makes friends on campus and has little time for Denise because of his busy social calendar. During an interview, the dean stresses that Hillman is a very difficult academic school. He warns Theo this his fun-filled weekend might be giving him the wrong impression. Denise later reiterates this over dinner; she was an excellent student in high school, and now is having trouble just passing her classes. She wants to take a semester off, but Theo encourages her to tough it out. Meanwhile, Maggie tries to write a letter to her boyfriend. Guest stars: Malcolm-Jamal Warner and Keshia Knight Pulliam Notes: This episode was the first one produced for the series that but it was retooled as it does not feature the characters played Jasmine Guy and Kadeem Hardison. It also features Vernee Watson-Johnson as part of the main cast at this point as Carla, the original Gilbert Hall director preceding the characters of Loretta Devine and Mary Alice who would later play the position. This also marks the final appearances of Lisa Bonet and Marissa Tomei as regular cast members on the series.

=== Season 2 (1988–89) ===
| No. overall | No. in season | Title | Directed by | Written by | Original release date | Prod. code | U.S. viewers (millions) | Rating/share (households) |
|---|---|---|---|---|---|---|---|---|
| 23 | 1 | "Dr. War Is Hell" | Debbie Allen | Thad Mumford | October 6, 1988 | 201 | 34.3 | 22.7/36 |
As the new school year begins, Dwayne faces the prospect of taking a calculus class from Col. Taylor, a tough professor nicknamed "Dr. War." He fears that Col. Taylor could expose his academic success as a fluke and destroy his dreams of becoming an engineer, so he asks Walter to help him get into another section. Walter believes that Dwayne could thrive under Col. Taylor's tutelage, and asks the professor to talk to him. Col. Taylor manages to change Dwayne's mind and convince him to enroll in his class. Whitley meets new roommate Kim Reese, a headstrong freshman who plans to become a doctor. Whitley hopes to intimidate Kim and drive her to another room but finds it impossible to break her. Jaleesa's cheerful freshman roommate, Freddie Brooks, develops a massive crush on Dwayne. Notes: Darryl M. Bell (Ron) and Sinbad (Walter) become regular cast members. First appearances of Charnele Brown (Kim), Cree Summer (Freddie), and Glynn Turman (Col. Taylor)
| 24 | 2 | "Two Gentlemen of Hillman" | Debbie Allen | Susan Fales | October 13, 1988 | 202 | 32.8 | 21.0/34 |
Dwayne pairs with irresponsible Ron to write a philosophy paper. Ron refuses to do his share of the work, instead of purchasing a ten-year-old paper. Dwayne is furious, particularly because he turned down an offer from a good student to work with Ron. Jaleesa warns Dwayne that his comments about Ron may have been too harsh. Despite his reservations, Dwayne decides to show his loyalty to Ron by using the old paper. Ron discovers that Whitley bought the same paper, and he and Dwayne are forced to work all weekend to finish the project. Ron later learns that Whitley never bought a paper; she helped Dwayne with a scam to trick Ron into actually working. Kim gets a job at campus hangout The Pit. Freddie is rejected by dozens of potential employers but vows to keep trying. Note: First recurring appearance of Lou Myers as Vernon Gaines
| 25 | 3 | "Some Enchanted Late Afternoon" | Debbie Allen | Rob Edwards | October 27, 1988 | 203 | 35.6 | 23.3/37 |
Walter asks Jaleesa on a date. She refuses because she is involved in a long-distance relationship. She finally agrees to join him for dinner, with the stipulation that they are just friends. Jaleesa has a great time with Walter and even shares a slow dance with him. However, she still refuses to break up with her boyfriend. Dwayne and Ron start a wake-up service.
| 26 | 4 | "Dream Lover" | Debbie Allen | Alicia Marie Schudt | November 3, 1988 | 205 | 34.7 | 22.7/35 |
During a party celebrating the end of midterms, Dwayne finds himself attracted to Whitley. She agrees to dance with him but runs out after he grabs her butt. Whitley is disturbed by an erotic dream about Dwayne, for which Kim teases her mercilessly. Whitley daydreams about Dwayne in the computer lab. After he helps her retrieve a file, she kisses him without thinking. Dwayne believes that Whitley is the secret admirer who sent him brownies and a poetry book; he becomes convinced that she wants him. Kim saves him from humiliation by revealing that Freddie sent the gifts. Whitley confesses to Lettie that she is a virgin. Lettie assures her that she has no reason to be embarrassed, and says that she shouldn't read too much into her dreams. When Freddie offers to bow out, Whitley melodramatically declares that she will step aside and let Freddie have Dwayne.
| 27 | 5 | "Three Girls Three" | Debbie Allen | Jeffrey Duteil | November 17, 1988 | 206 | 38.4 | 24.2/37 |
Whitley and Jaleesa team up for an audition to sing backup at an upcoming Gladys Knight concert on campus. They ask Angela, an aspiring opera singer, to join them. After Whitley and Jaleesa improve Angela's stage presence and teach her how to sing popular music, she turns into an insufferable diva. They throw her out of the group, but she forms her own trio and wins the audition. Whitley goes nuts and tries to attack Angela, embarrassing herself in front of Gladys Knight in the process. Jaleesa and Whitley realize they should have followed their instincts and tried out as a duo. They imagine what it might have been like to sing with Gladys. Meanwhile, Freddie tries to work up the nerve to ask Dwayne to the concert. Note: Knight performs "Love Overboard" with Dawnn Lewis and Jasmine Guy.
| 28 | 6 | "If You Like Pilgrim Coladas" | Debbie Allen | Margie Peters | November 24, 1988 | 207 | 27.8 | 16.1/30 |
Whitley and Kim stay at the dorm for Thanksgiving. Depressed by the thought of Thanksgiving dinner at the Pit, they decide to go out. Kim uses a fake ID to get them into a club. Whitley does not realize that the waiter served them non-alcoholic drinks; she ends up performing a number and dancing on the bar. Kim spots Col. Taylor in the crowd and tries to warn Whitley. Col. Taylor helps Whitley fight off an overzealous admirer. Although he confiscates Kim's fake ID, he doesn't report them to Lettie because he feels there is no harm in blowing off a little steam. Walter hopes to get closer with Jaleesa as he drives her home for Thanksgiving. His plans are thwarted when Freddie and Dwayne join them in the car, but Jaleesa later gives him the good news that she broke up with her boyfriend.
| 29 | 7 | "A Stepping Stone" | Debbie Allen | Cheryl Gard | December 1, 1988 | 204 | 36.1 | 23.8/37 |
Whitley choreographs Gilbert Hall's step routine for a competition during homecoming festivities. She annoys everyone with her pushy attitude, and team captain Jaleesa throws her off the squad for insulting the rhythmless Freddie. Whitley reconsiders her behavior following a meeting with her childhood idol, a respected 92-year-old alumnus who never married and is completely friendless. Walter blackmails Dwayne into tutoring the football team's star offensive lineman, "The Meat Locker," for a math test that he must pass to remain eligible for the big game.
| 30 | 8 | "Life With Father" | Debbie Allen | Cheryl Gard | December 8, 1988 | 209 | 36.9 | 23.2/36 |
Dwayne believes that he may have found love with his new girlfriend, Suzanne. He reconsiders the relationship when he learns that her father is Col. Taylor. After seeing Dwayne with Suzanne, Freddie vows to change her "cute" image and make herself more alluring to men. She turns to Whitley for a complete makeover but decides she would rather be herself.
| 31 | 9 | "All's Fair" | Debbie Allen | Rob Edwards | December 15, 1988 | 208 | 37.7 | 24.2/39 |
Kim begins spending a lot of time in her dorm room with her boyfriend, Robert. Whitley tries to be understanding and sets up a system to allow the couple some privacy. However, she quickly grows tired of being locked out of her own room and quarrels with Kim. She notes that Robert's bed is vacant and decides to move into his room. Kim goes to the guys' dorm to retrieve Whitley, and they agree that they deserve each other. Freddie edits a poetry magazine, but her harsh critiques make her unpopular with classmates.
| 32 | 10 | "Radio Free Hillman" | Debbie Allen | Jeffrey Duteil | January 5, 1989 | 211 | 40.2 | 25.0/37 |
Ron slips Dwayne a bootlegged copy of a new rap album, which he immediately puts on the air. The dean pulls the plug on Dwayne's shows because of the explicit content of one of the songs. Dwayne and the other students conduct a sit-in at the administration building to protest the censorship of student media. Whitley gets trapped in the building with the demonstrators and drives everyone crazy. After listening to the rest of the tape, Dwayne concludes that he should not have played material without listening to it beforehand. The dean does not punish the protesters. She suspends Dwayne from the airwaves for a month but allows him to hold a special tribute show for Dr. Martin Luther King Jr.'s birthday.
| 33 | 11 | "It Happened One Night" | Debbie Allen | Susan Fales & Margie Peters | January 12, 1989 | 210 | 42.1 | 26.1/39 |
Kim refuses to take calls from Robert, and simply tells her friends that they fought. She confesses to Whitley that she may be pregnant. Whitley offers her complete support, and even sacrifices her car by loaning it to Freddie to prevent her from pestering Kim. Robert explains his predicament to Walter; he made the situation worse by suggesting that Kim get an abortion. Walter tells Robert to give Kim some space, but he sneaks into the girls' dorm with Dwayne. Robert apologizes for his initial reaction and asks Kim to marry him. They decide to wait until after her doctor's appointment before considering such a big step. Kim is relieved to learn that she is not pregnant, and endures a stern lecture from Lettie.
| 34 | 12 | "I've Got the Muse in Me" | Debbie Allen | Bud Wiser | January 26, 1989 | 212 | 38.0 | 23.5/36 |
Freddie grapples with writer's block as she works on a creative writing assignment. Kim encourages her to take a break and come to a party, which Dwayne and Ron have organized in honor of a popular rib joint's final night in business. Whitley has resolved to eat only healthy foods but finds herself tempted by the ribs. Freddie gets drunk and claims to have rediscovered her "muse." After Walter breaks up the party, she steals some booze and ends up passed out in the library. She awakes with a hangover the next morning and discovers that the paper she wrote while drunk is terrible. Walter lies about his culinary abilities to impress Jaleesa. Lettie and Mr. Gaines try to teach him how to cook to ensure that his dinner with Jaleesa isn't a total disaster.
| 35 | 13 | "Risky Business" | Debbie Allen | Cheryl Gard | February 2, 1989 | 213 | 43.2 | 26.9/41 |
Clair Huxtable attends the Hillman job fair to conduct a seminar on business etiquette. She brings her teenage daughter Vanessa and her friend Kara in the hopes of convincing Vanessa to attend Hillman. (She and Dr. Huxtable would like to have a child actually graduate from their alma mater.) Dwayne has a disastrous interview with the Kinishewa electrons company. Clair agrees to lobby the company rep a longtime friend who is attracted to her on Dwayne's behalf. Vanessa and Kara ditch Whitley and Jaleesa so that they can cruise the campus alone. The girls lie about their age and identity and convince Dwayne and Ron to take them out. The foursome runs into Clair and Phillip at a restaurant. A fuming Clair drags the girls away, and Dwayne gets his internship. Guest stars: Phylicia Rashad, Tempestt Bledsoe, and Elizabeth Navereaz
| 36 | 14 | "Breaking Up Is Hard to Do" | Debbie Allen | Mike Scott & Daryl G. Nickens | February 9, 1989 | 216 | 39.5 | 24.3/37 |
Dwayne gives Suzanne an expensive ring for Valentine's Day. She returns it to him and asks for some space, which drives him crazy. She later breaks up with him, as she is not ready for a serious relationship. Dwayne gives Whitley some chocolates to thank her for her advice and support. She has been stood up by her date, so she goes to the movies with him. As a prank, Jaleesa calls Walter and impersonates a Jamaican woman named Sheila. Walter accepts a date with Sheila, and Jaleesa plans to burst him for cheating on her. However, he turns the tables by donning a deadlock wig and bringing in a group of guys to sing "Jaleesa is Shiela, Shiela is Jaleesa!" Kim learns that Robert, who is away in England for six months, is cheating on her.
| 37 | 15 | "For She's Only a Bird in a Gilded Cage" | Debbie Allen | Susan Fales | February 16, 1989 | 217 | 40.4 | 24.1/37 |
Whitley experiences anxiety about a visit from her mother, Marion, who is obsessed with finding her daughter a husband. She criticizes Whitley for paying more attention to academics and potential jobs than the hunt for a mate. Whitley is pleased to receive a phone call from a handsome childhood acquaintance, who is now enrolled in medical school. She soon learns that her mother got the guy's phone number and encouraged him to date, Whitley. Whitley embarrasses Marion by storming out during an important function and later calls her mother to task her behavior. However, Marion doesn't understand what she has done wrong. Freddie goes all out to implement a new campus recycling program. Guest star: Diahann Carroll
| 38 | 16 | "It's Greek to Me" | Debbie Allen | Jeffrey Duteil | February 23, 1989 | 215 | 41.9 | 24.9/38 |
Ron and Dwayne pledge a fraternity. Ron thoroughly enjoys the experience, while Dwayne grows tired of having the "brothers" push him around. They convince Whitley to charm a member who has a crush on her and finds out their chances of gaining entry to the house. Whitley informs Dwayne that they are a shoo-in, but he has decided to drop out. Whitley reminds him that Ron may leave him behind if he joins the fraternity alone. Dwayne shows Ron his support by helping him put on a show for underprivileged youth (which he must complete ensuring his membership). They decide that they can maintain their friendship despite their different interests.
| 39 | 17 | "The Thing About Women" | Debbie Allen | Rob Edwards | March 2, 1989 | 214 | 39.9 | 25.0/39 |
Jaleesa accepts a dinner invitation from her ex-husband, Lamar. Walter pretends that he is okay with this, but is secretly jealous. All of the girls fawn over the handsome and suave Lamar when he arrives to pick up Jaleesa. (including Whitley, who had been ranting about what a dog he was). Walter shows up to meet his competition and is hurt when Jaleesa calls him a "friend." Lamar claims to be a changed man and seeks reconciliation. Jaleesa is extremely wary; she storms out after he reveals that he is living with a woman, whom he hopes to dump for Jaleesa. Although Walter responds sarcastically to Jaleesa's apology, they later work out their differences. Guest star: Thomas Mikal Ford
| 40 | 18 | "High Anxiety" | Debbie Allen | Thad Mumford | March 9, 1989 | 218 | 37.1 | 22.7/35 |
Kim becomes overwhelmed by her hectic schedule, as she tries to balance pre-med courses with work and extracurricular activities. She also obsesses over her grades, suffering from nightmares about getting too many B's to make it into medical school. She buys a datebook and tries to plan every moment of her day, ignoring her friends' warnings that her lack of sleep could endanger her health. Kim finally agrees to cut back on her activities after fainting in the Pit. Mr. Gaines quarrels with his wife over the presence of their grown son, whom he wants to throw out of the house. Mr. Gaines crashes at Col. Taylor's place after Velma kicks him out, and quickly wears out his welcome.
| 41 | 19 | "Take This Job and Love It" | Debbie Allen | Yvette Denise Lee | March 16, 1989 | 219 | 35.3 | 22.7/36 |
Whitley hits Mr. Gaines' car, causing nearly $1,000 in damage. She is afraid to ask her father for the money because she fears that he will take her car away. Kim helps her get a job at the Pit to fund the repairs. Whitley initially annoys Mr. Gaines with her incompetence, but soon impresses him with a series of innovative suggestions that help boost profits. Kim feels insecure, as she is no longer Mr. Gaines' favorite employee. Ron endures campus-wide embarrassment after a classmate gives him a terrible haircut.
| 42 | 20 | "No Means No" | Debbie Allen | Margie Peters | March 30, 1989 | 220 | 39.3 | 24.8/40 |
Freddie falls for Garth Parks, a handsome and intelligent baseball star. Teammate Dwayne backs out of a date to the dance with Freddie so that she can go with Garth. However, Dwayne is disturbed when Garth shares details of a past incident with a woman. Dwayne describes the story to Walter, who confirms that it should be considered date rape. When Dwayne tries to dissuade Freddie from dating Garth, she accuses him of jealously. Garth takes Freddie to an observation point and tries to force himself on her, but Dwayne comes to the rescue. Freddie and Dwayne make statements to the police and help put Garth behind bars Guest star: Taimak Note: Due to a sensitive and mature subject Parental discretion is advised.
| 43 | 21 | "Citizen Wayne" | Debbie Allen | Mike Scott & Daryl G. Nickens | April 27, 1989 | 221 | 30.0 | 20.0/35 |
Dwayne runs for student council president. Although he has good ideas about scholarships and ways to fund student activities, no one will listen to him. They prefer the approach of his opponent, who only talks about parties. Rev. Jesse Jackson comes to the university for a lecture and stays with Col. Taylor. Ron tries to win votes by printing posters that imply that Dwayne has Rev. Jackson's endorsement. Dwayne apologizes to Rev. Jackson and plans to drop out of the race. Rev. Jackson encourages Dwayne to keep fighting; even if he loses, he can present his message to the students. Jaleesa and Kim struggle to find a present for Freddie's 18th birthday, but she seems to beat them to the punch on every gift idea. Guest star: Jesse Jackson as himself
| 44 | 22 | "There's No Place Like Home" | Debbie Allen | Lynn Bunt & Lenore G. Bunt | May 4, 1989 | 222 | 30.8 | 20.7/35 |
Dwayne and Ron plan to rent a beautiful apartment for the next school year. They can no longer afford the place after Ron's father cuts back on his allowance because of his slipping grades. They are forced to rent a dump that is managed by Velma Gaines. Dwayne and Ron throw a housewarming party and decide that their new apartment will work out. Walter looks forward to a summer of freedom until Jaleesa announces that she has received a promotion and can visit more often than expected. They agree to spend time apart to "sow wild oats." Whitley plans to work at a museum all summer, but feels guilty because she would rather join her mother on a cruise. Dwayne encourages her to have fun, as there will be plenty of time to work and act responsibly in the future. Dwayne and Whitley begin to show an interest in each other. Note: This episode marks the final appearance of Mary Alice on the series.

=== Season 3 (1989–90) ===
| No. overall | No. in season | Title | Directed by | Written by | Original release date | Prod. code | U.S. viewers (millions) | Rating/share (households) |
|---|---|---|---|---|---|---|---|---|
| 45 | 1 | "Strangers on a Plane" | Debbie Allen | Thad Mumford | September 28, 1989 | 301 | 36.6 | 23.4/38 |
Dwayne and Whitley run into each other on a flight back to school. Whitley finds that Dwayne has changed over the summer, as he is dressed in an expensive suit and seems to have matured during his successful internship at Kinishewa. Dwayne comforts Whitley when the plane experiences turbulence. Whitley kisses Dwayne in front of her entire dorm, prompting much teasing from her friends. Each insists that they are only friends. Whitley goes to Dwayne's apartment to see him but is turned off when she finds him dancing like an idiot at a party. The residents of Gilbert Hall struggle to adjust to the fact that the dorm is now coed. Walter is the resident director, with Jaleesa as a resident assistant.
| 46 | 2 | "The Heat Is On" | Debbie Allen | Susan Fales | October 12, 1989 | 302 | 33.1 | 21.7/36 |
Whitley has yet to take a basic math course that is required for graduation. She reluctantly enrolls in Col. Taylor's class, and he tries to help her overcome her fear of the subject. Dwayne and Ron clash over finances. Dwayne believes that Ron spends money too freely, while Ron accuses him of being a cheapskate.
| 47 | 3 | "The Hat Makes the Man" | Debbie Allen | Cheryl Gard | October 19, 1989 | 303 | 35.2 | 22.5/36 |
Walter and Jaleesa celebrate the anniversary of their first date but are distracted by conflicts over dorm discipline. Walter allows a shy male student to let his girlfriend stay overnight before she ships out with the Navy. When Jaleesa disagrees and recommends that Quincy be punished, Walter pulls rank on her. They argue during their anniversary dinner, and she winds up storming out of the restaurant. The girls accuse Walter of a double standard; they refuse to vacate Quincy's room until Walter either punishes him or agrees to let them have guys stay over. Whitley demands only the return of her high-powered hairdryer, which has been blamed for many outages. Walter orders Quincy to appear before the dorm council and establishes measures to prevent further instances of sexism. Dwayne and Freddie take procrastination to a new level while collaborating on a research paper.
| 48 | 4 | "To Have and Have Not" | Debbie Allen | Kevin Kelton | October 26, 1989 | 304 | 35.6 | 23.1/38 |
Walter convinces many of the students to volunteer at a community center. Whitley teaches ballet to the children and becomes friends with a young boy named Dion, who claims to be dirt poor. Whitley's wallet is stolen, and she is stunned to learn that Dion was the culprit. He exaggerated the extent of his poverty and took advantage of Whitley's kindness. Whitley does not want to return to the center, but Walter insists that the kids need a positive influence if they are to escape from the streets. Whitley continues with her teaching and refuses to give up on Dion. Walter's duties keep him away from his bowling team, so Col. Taylor agrees to step in. When he turns out to be terrible, Mr. Gaines and the other team members try to find a way to oust him.
| 49 | 5 | "Forever Hold Your Peace" | Debbie Allen | Susan Fales | November 2, 1989 | 307 | 39.8 | 24.7/38 |
Dwayne drives Whitley to New York for her father's wedding. He drops in on the Huxtables, hoping to rekindle his relationship with Denise and convince her to return to Hillman. Denise sends him reeling with the news that she married a Naval lieutenant during a sojourn to Africa, and is the stepmother of a three-year-old girl. Whitley becomes depressed about her father's marriage. She believes that he will forget her as he starts a family with a new wife. Dwayne and Whitley compare notes about their personal crises. They get caught in a blizzard, and Whitley's car suffers a flat tire. She and Dwayne huddle in the back seat and continue to comfort each other. They begin kissing but are jarred back to reality by the tow truck's arrival. Guest stars: Phylicia Rashad, Joseph C. Phillips, Raven-Symoné, and Lisa Bonet (her final appearance on the series)
| 50 | 6 | "Delusions of Daddyhood" | Debbie Allen | Yvette Denise Lee | November 9, 1989 | 309 | 38.6 | 24.1/37 |
Ron takes a liking to his study partner, Elizabeth; and is surprised to learn that she has a 13-month-old son. He is unsure about getting involved, but quickly bonds with the child. Believing that the boy needs a positive male role model, Ron tries a little too hard to step in and become a father figure. Dwayne arranges a performance by his old friends Heavy D & the Boyz for a charity concert. Whitley, who had hoped to bring in an opera company, organizes an anti-rap protest. She makes a fool of herself by espousing her views to Heavy D, unaware of his identity. Heavy eventually wins Whitley over, and the gang joins him onstage to dance during the show. Guest stars: Theresa Randle and Heavy D and the Boyz, who perform the song "Somebody for Me."
| 51 | 7 | "Wedding Bells From Hell" | Debbie Allen | Adriana Trigiani | November 16, 1989 | 310 | 38.2 | 24.1/37 |
Walter wins a free Hawaiian honeymoon from a car wash, so he asks Jaleesa to marry him. Although she is uncertain, she eventually says yes. They plan to wed in two weeks. Jaleesa fears they are rushing and wants to call the whole thing off, but Walter reassures her. During the ceremony, the simultaneously announce that they don't want to get married; Jaleesa believes their interests are too different, while Walter can't fathom a lifetime commitment. They promise to remain friends, even though they will no longer date. Whitley enlists Dwayne's help in planning the wedding. She changes the subject whenever he tries to confess his attraction to her. Dwayne finally pulls Whitley into a kiss, which nearly causes her to faint. He asks her out after the wedding, but she is not ready for a relationship.
| 52 | 8 | "Great Expectations" | Debbie Allen | Yvette Denise Lee | November 30, 1989 | 305 | 35.3 | 23.0/37 |
Kim and Freddie plan to spend homecoming weekend at Freaknic, a music festival in Washington D.C. Kim's policeman father calls and forbids her to go to the concert. Kim decides to go anyway, and Whitley has to distract her father when he arrives unexpectedly. When Kim returns, Mr. Reese yells at her and threatens to make her transfer to a hometown school. She insists that she is a responsible 19-year-old who should be allowed to make her own decisions, but her father restricts her to the house for the rest of her vacations. Whitley tries to convince Kim that she is lucky to have someone who cares enough to yell at her, as Whitley seldom received attention from her parents as a child. Ron and Dwayne face a dilemma when each brings a girl back to the apartment. Guest star: Richard Roundtree as Kim's father
| 53 | 9 | "Answered Prayers" | Debbie Allen | Margie Peters | December 7, 1989 | 306 | 31.4 | 20.4/33 |
Kim learns that her father has been shot in the line of duty. Whitley drives her to Ohio to see him, with Dwayne and Freddie along for moral support. Kim visits her father's hospital room and makes peace with him. After Mr. Reese begins to recover, Whitley, Dwayne, and Freddie have to race back to campus for midterms. Freddie reveals that she had been unsure of the existence of God until she prayed at Kim's request; having her prayer answered was a life-changing experience. She questions her newfound faith after Mr. Reese experiences complications and is left paralyzed from the waist down.
| 54 | 10 | "For Whom the Jingle Bell Tolls" | Debbie Allen | Cheryl Gard | December 21, 1989 | 312 | 29.3 | 18.6/30 |
Whitley is in a foul mood during the holiday season, especially when her mother insists that they fly to the south of France instead of spending a quiet Christmas at home. She codly rejects Freddie's offer to spend Christmas with her, and refuses to attend the gang's tree-trimming party. Whitley's mother appears to her in a dream and warns that she is headed for the same lonely, isolated existence as Marion. Whitley is visited by ghosts of Christmas past, present, and future (who bear an uncanny resemblance to Mr. Gaines, Walter, and Jaleesa). She learns that Freddie will end up staying with Dwayne for the holidays, leading to a romance between the two. Whitley discovers that Dwayne and Freddie will marry, while she will spend her entire life alone. Whitley suddenly gets into the holiday spirit, decorates everything in sight, and asks Freddie to come along to France. However, Marion shows up at the dorm and tells her daughter that she wants to spend Christmas in Richmond. Guest star: Diahann Carroll
| 55 | 11 | "Under One Roof" | Debbie Allen | Kevin Kelton | January 4, 1990 | 308 | 33.7 | 21.6/32 |
Dean Hughes asks Whitley to spend the weekend at her house and co-host the annual freshman tea. Whitley considers this a great honor until Freddie is named the other co-host. Whitley hopes to convince Dean Hughes to send her to Europe as Hillman's student recruiter. Then the dean does not believe that Whitley possesses the necessary skill and discipline for this position. A hurt Whitley insults Freddie and tries to leave, but admits to the dean that she lacks direction. Dean Hughes cheers up the girls and manages to convince Whitley to relax a little. Ron allows a classmate to crash at the guys' place, and the man keeps coming up with reasons to stay. He keeps Dwayne and Ron happy by cooking, cleaning, and fixing the toilet. Walter tells them that Earl is a scam artist who flunked out of school. Before they can confront him, Mr. Gaines hires Earl as the building superintendent.
| 56 | 12 | "Here's to Old Friends" | Neema Barnette | Thad Mumford | January 11, 1990 | 311 | 33.6 | 21.4/33 |
Dwayne's old friend Milt comes for a visit. He believes that Hillman is holding Dwayne back, and encourages him to transfer to the University of Pennsylvania. Milt also recommends that Dwayne distance himself from "dead weight" like Ron. Dwayne considers his friend's words until a talk with Whitley helps remind him of Ron's good qualities and the feeling of family that Hillman holds for its students. He defends the school's academic reputation to Milt, Col. Taylor, and Mr. Gaines attend a reunion for U.S. servicemen. Col. Taylor tries to start a romance with a nurse he knew in Vietnam, only to discover that she is a complete mess.
| 57 | 13 | "The Power of the Pen" | Debbie Allen | Dominic Hoffman & Jasmine Guy | January 18, 1990 | 313 | 33.9 | 20.8/32 |
Dwayne struggles with an assignment for a poetry class, as the students must compose their own verses. William Shakespeare appears to him in a dream and stresses that his pursuit of a career in math does not mean that he cannot also appreciate poetry. He encourages Dwayne to write about something for which he feels passion. Whitley reads Dwayne's beautiful poem and believes that it is about her. She is angry and embarrassed when the rest of the class interprets the poem differently; it is actually about Dwayne's love of mathematics. Freddie juggles dates with environmentalist Livingston and Ron's handsome friend Ernest. Although neither relationship is exclusive, she feels guilty until she sees Livingston with another girl.
| 58 | 14 | "Pride and Prejudice" | John Whitesell | Yvette Denise Lee | January 25, 1990 | 314 | 36.9 | 22.4/34 |
Whitley goes to a jewelry store to buy a present for her father. Freddie tags along because she enjoys watching Whitley's "power shop." The clerk ignores them and is reluctant to open the display case. She also suggests a cheap watch, as she doesn't think that Whitley can afford any of the high-end merchandise. Freddie believes that the clerk is a racist and decides to leave. Whitley argues that the clerk probably thought they were poor because of their manner of dress. Whitley spends a fortune to prove herself, but her friends argue that this only gives the clerk a fat commission. Whitley returns everything and tells the clerk off, getting the woman in hot water with her manager. The ROTC holds a retreat to teach civilians about life in the Army. Walter makes a fool of himself and loses a bet to Col. Taylor. Dwayne ignores Ron's instructions during a flag capture game. He gets lost in the mountains and comes in contact with poison.
| 59 | 15 | "Success, Lies and Videotape" | Debbie Allen | Adriana Trigiani | February 8, 1990 | 317 | 35.4 | 21.9/34 |
Clair Huxtable visits the Hillman campus to videotape the students discussing their goals for the future. Although the taping is supposed to resemble a professional interview, Clair winds up playing the role of counselor. Freddie opts out of the interview in order to work on an archaeology assignment. She notices discrepancies between the Gilbert Hall laundry room and its original blueprints. She knocks down a wall and discovers a hidden room, which was part of the Underground Railroad that aided escaping slaves. Freddie is overwhelmed by her discovery and vows to make a difference in her life. Guest star: Phylicia Rashad
| 60 | 16 | "A World Alike" | Debbie Allen | Susan Fales | February 15, 1990 | 315 | 35.2 | 21.9/34 |
Whitley meets Julian, an attractive exchange student from Georgetown who is part of Hillman's anti-apartheid group. Kim receives a scholarship that will solve her financial problems and allow her to gain work experience in a lab, rather than flipping burgers at the Pit. Unfortunately, Freddie discovers that the company funding the scholarship is a subsidiary of a corporation with investments in South Africa. Julian proposes a boycott; he angers Whitley by recommending that Hillman cut all financial ties with the corporation, as this would cost Kim her scholarship. Due to her father's health problems, Kim would have to work two jobs to stay in school. A young man from South Africa argues against the termination of scholarships, because he feels that the success of African American students serves as a beacon of hope to black South Africans mired in poverty and oppression. Kim decides to turn down the scholarship anyway. Whitley accepts a date with Julian. Guest stars: Lebohang "Lebo M." Morake and Suli McCullough
| 61 | 17 | "That's the Trouble With You All" | Neema Barnette | Thad Mumford | February 22, 1990 | 318 | 33.5 | 21.0/32 |
Whitley plays matchmaker for Dwayne and a beautiful student in the hopes of convincing him to move on. However, she becomes extremely jealous and tries to sabotage the couple's date. Dwayne and Whitley try to establish some ground rules in an attempt to save their friendship. Walter and Jaleesa challenge each other to turn novices Kobie and Freddie into accomplished poker players. Neither apprentice picks up the game, but Jaleesa literally beats the pants off of Walter.
| 62 | 18 | "A Campfire Story" | Debbie Allen | Kevin Kelton | March 1, 1990 | 316 | 31.9 | 21.0/33 |
A lovesick Dwayne convinces Walter to let him tag along on a recruiting trip to North Carolina, where he is trying to sign a high school basketball prospect. Walter gets pulled over for speeding and is arrested because of his unpaid jaywalking tickets. Alvin Dix, the young man Walter is recurring, has to bail him out of jail. Alvin shows little interest in Hillman because he wants to play for legendary coach Cap Conners. Walter, who played for Conners, tells Dwayne that the coach cares only about basketball and discourages players from getting a good education. Walter and Dwayne cause a melee at a restaurant when they mistake Conners' wife for a groupie, as the coach had used attractive women to recruit players in the past. Alvin eventually realizes that he and Conners have philosophical differences, so he decides to consider Hillman. Dwayne causes problems throughout the trip because he keeps seeing Whitley's face on every woman and deer. Jaleesa engages in another battle of the sexes.
| 63 | 19 | "Hillman Isn't Through With You Yet" | Debbie Allen | Yvette Denise Lee | March 8, 1990 | 319 | 32.3 | 20.7/32 |
Whitley has trouble finding a job after graduation, while Jaleesa mulls several offers. Ron's sister Rachel, who is staying with Whitley and Kim during a campus visit, suggests the career of an art buyer. Whitley becomes very excited about this idea and uses her mother's connections to set up an interview. She fails to get the job because she lacks financial experience. Whitley decides to stay at Hillman another year and take some business courses. Rachel grows tired of Ron's overprotective behavior. Dwayne hosts an incoming freshman (Alfonso Ribeiro), a lecherous math enthusiast who reminds everyone of a younger Dwayne.
| 64 | 20 | "21 Candles" | Debbie Allen | Adriana Trigiani | March 15, 1990 | 320 | 31.7 | 20.3/32 |
Whitley is distraught when everyone, including Julian, seems to have forgotten her 21st birthday. Kim has actually remembered and is planning a girls-only surprise party. Dwayne and Ron decide to kidnap Whitley and throw her in a fountain. Kim falls to thwart their plans, but Ron falls while climbing the dorm wall and injuries his leg. A depressed Whitley gets drunk on cheap wine and has a dinner date with her photograph of Denzel Washington. The girls arrive to take her out; they agree that she should have told Julian about her birthday instead of expecting him to find out on his own. Jaleesa pretends not to care when she sees Walter on a date with the medic who treated Ron. Whitley apologizes to Julian for testing him.
| 65 | 21 | "Sweet Charity" | Neema Barnette | Margie Peters | March 29, 1990 | 321 | 31.1 | 20.0/32 |
Walter learns that Kim is working all night at a funeral parlor to cover her expenses. He enlists the help of Whitley and Freddie to come up with a plan to help her out. Whitley and Freddie buy gifts for Kim and get everyone to stuff the tip jar at the Pit. Kim realizes what they were doing and becomes very angry, as she doesn't want to be a charity case. Mr. Gaines finally convinces her to overcome her pride and accept a loan from his wife and him, which she can pay off after becoming a doctor. A director approaches Ron and Dwayne at the basketball courts and asks them to appear in a vitamin commercial. They agree because they are having trouble paying the bills. The guys believe that they will receive fame and adulation until they discover that they must play two-on-two against a pair of retired NBA all-stars. Guest stars: Rick Barry and Walt Hazzard
| 66 | 22 | "Soldier Boy" | Neema Barnette | Leilani Downer | April 5, 1990 | 322 | 29.8 | 19.7/33 |
Col. Taylor is the guest of honor at a campus roast. Frank Benning, a man from his first platoon in Vietnam, comes in to serve as the surprise guest speaker. Col. Taylor feels very uncomfortable; he believes that he committed an error on the battlefield that cost Frank his leg. Frank tells a different version of events in his speech. He insists that Col. Taylor is a great leader whose bravery saved everyone's lives. Ron tries to organize the dinner while fretting about the impending selection of the ROTC's Cadet of the Year award. Dwayne bets Whitley that she cannot go a full day without flirting.
| 67 | 23 | "Getaway: Part 1" | Debbie Allen | Cheryl Gard | April 19, 1990 | 324 | 32.1 | 20.8/35 |
Dwayne, Ron, Kim, Freddie, and Ernest head to Devil's Island, South Carolina for spring break. Whitley joins them at the last minute after Julian has to cancel their vacation due to a job interview. Ernest has big plans for Freddie but passes out drunk. Ron tries to put the moves on Kim. A pair of murderous drug dealers search the gang's van for a missing duffel bag. Dwayne and Ron discover money and drugs in the bag and try to go the police. Freddie and Kim meet the drug dealers on the beach and flirt with them, unaware that they are criminals. Dwayne and Ron return to the house after missing the ferry. Dwayne overhears the men threatening to kill him and tries to make a break for it. Guest star: Susan Fales
| 68 | 24 | "Getaway: Part 2" | Debbie Allen | Cheryl Gard | April 26, 1990 | 325 | 29.5 | 19.5/33 |
Julian shows up to surprise Whitley, who wants nothing to do with him. Dwayne and Ron dress like women to get past the drug dealers and onto the ferry. They arrive at the police station to discover that they accidentally brought Julian's bag instead of the one with drugs and cash. Paul and Eric search the house, failing to recognize Dwayne and Ron (who are still disguised as "Diana" and Rhonda"). They promise to return that night. The gang fears that the police will not make it in time because a storm has cancelled all ferry service. Kim, Freddie, Ron, and Mandy head out in search of help. Whitley decides to sleep with Julian, but he doesn't think the timing is right. Dwayne hears the dealers coming and bursts into Whitley and Julian's room. Whitley gets into an argument with Dwayne after telling him that she is a virgin. As she opens the door to get him to leave, she gestures with a candlestick holder and cracks Eric over the head. Guest star: Susan Fales
| 69 | 25 | "Perhaps Love" | Debbie Allen | Susan Fales | May 3, 1990 | 323 | 27.6 | 18.1/30 |
Dwayne is selected for Phi Beta Kappa, and his mother comes to town to watch his induction ceremony. Julian tells Whitley that he wants to ask her something important during their next lunch date, leading her to believe that he plans to propose. He instead asks her to spend the summer with him in Washington D.C.; he will get her a secretarial job with his company. When Whitley insists on attending summer school and taking an internship, Julian accuses her of being sheltered. Whitley goes to Dwayne's apartment in search of advice, and mistakes Mrs. Wayne for a maid. Dwayne tries to cheer Whitley during a dinner party organized by his mother; he admits that Whitley is spoiled, but believes that Julian should giver her some credit for setting her sights on a career. Mrs. Wayne warns her son that Whitley is trouble. Whitley gives Dwayne a gift and thanks him for always being so supportive. Mrs. Wayne asks her to join them at Dwayne's induction ceremony. Guest star: Patti LaBelle, in her first appearance as Dwayne's mother.

=== Season 4 (1990–91) ===
| No. overall | No. in season | Title | Directed by | Written by | Original release date | Prod. code | U.S. viewers (millions) | Rating/share (households) |
|---|---|---|---|---|---|---|---|---|
| 70 | 1 | "Everything Must Change" | Debbie Allen | Susan Fales | September 20, 1990 | 401 | 28.6 | 18.6/30 |
Whitley returns from her travels determined to begin a relationship with Dwayne; however, he has moved on to a romance with newcomer Kinu, a student at nearby Avery University whom he met while in Japan. Col. Taylor's son Terrence arrives from Germany, quickly earning the nickname "Pee-Wee Hormone" for his clueless pursuit of women. Note: First recurring appearances of Alisa Gyse Dickens (Kinu) and Cory Tyler (Terrence)
| 71 | 2 | "How Bittersweet It Is" | Debbie Allen | Yvette Denise Lee | September 27, 1990 | 402 | 25.4 | 17.1/27 |
Whitley tries to make Dwayne jealous by accepting a date with Ron, who knows but hopes to change her feelings; students compete to win places in Professor Randolph's African-American History class, including Freddie and her cousin Matthew, a White student visiting from Avery. Guest star: Roger Guenveur Smith Note: First recurring appearance of Andrew Lowery (Matthew)
| 72 | 3 | "Blues for Nobody's Child" | Debbie Allen | Judi Ann Mason | October 4, 1990 | 404 | 29.0 | 19.4/31 |
Freddie is moved by the difficulty of finding adoptive parents for older African-American children in the foster care system and makes it her mission to convince Prof. Randolph to adopt a child she has met through the community center.
| 73 | 4 | "Whitley's Last Supper" | Debbie Allen | Jeannette Collins & Mimi Friedman | October 11, 1990 | 406 | 32.0 | 20.0/32 |
Whitley looks forward to a visit from her father until she learns he has come to cut up her credit cards and force her to live on a budget; Matthew and Freddie conspire to convince Kim to balance her MCAT studies with a social life. Guest star: Ron O'Neal, in his first appearance as Mercer Gilbert
| 74 | 5 | "The Goodwill Games" | Debbie Allen | Yvette Denise Lee | October 18, 1990 | 407 | 30.0 | 19.3/30 |
Dwayne, Whitley, and Kinu participate in a College Bowl-type competition between Hillman and Avery, exacerbating the romantic competition the two women already are in. Kim is encouraged by Freddie to make way for a romance of her own, with Matthew.
| 75 | 6 | "Tales From the Exam Zone" | Debbie Allen | Alonzo B. Lamont | October 25, 1990 | 405 | 27.9 | 17.9/29 |
Walter narrates a trio of tales, á la The Twilight Zone, about strange occurrences among the students as they prepare for midterm exams. Guest star: Jenifer Lewis
| 76 | 7 | "Good Help Is Hard to Fire" | Debbie Allen | Glenn Berenbeim | November 8, 1990 | 408 | 32.1 | 20.0/30 |
Ron and Whitley concoct a plan for her to earn money by cleaning Dwayne's apartment and further driving a wedge between him and Kinu. Guest star: Patti LaBelle Notes: The song prominently played during the anniversary party is Jasmine Guy's debut single "Try Me"; the video also aired during the final commercial break.
| 77 | 8 | "Love Thy Neighbor" | Rob Schiller | Yvette Denise Lee | November 15, 1990 | 410 | 29.2 | 18.8/29 |
Now that Kinu and Dwayne have broken up, Whitley hopes her time has come. However, Dwayne is less eager to start a relationship than she had expected. Ron shows no sympathy during a class discussion about the homeless – until he crosses paths with an old friend.
| 78 | 9 | "Time Keeps on Slippin'" | Michael Peters | Glenn Berenbeim | November 29, 1990 | 411 | 29.7 | 18.6/29 |
Freddie and Ron are made the chairs of a committee to decide the contents of Hillman's 1990 time capsule; Dwayne must find a way to be a good boyfriend while remaining a good student. Note: The episode includes an early mention of a condom, although NBC did not allow one to be shown on camera.
| 79 | 10 | "The Apple Doesn't Fall" | Art Dielhenn | Gary H. Miller | December 13, 1990 | 412 | 27.8 | 18.2/29 |
Ron wrestles with telling his father that he'd rather be a professional musician than a car salesman, and Terrence argues with his father over the Col.'s Taylor's interest in joining a previously racially restricted golf club. Guest star: Art Evans
| 80 | 11 | "I'm Dreaming of a Wayne Christmas" | Debbie Allen | Judi Ann Mason | December 20, 1990 | 409 | 27.4 | 17.5/29 |
During a Christmas visit to Brooklyn with Dwayne and Ron, Whitley is anxious to change the negative impression that Mrs. Wayne has of her. But her efforts progress from bad to worse when she gets robbed on the subway by a man posing as Santa Claus and arrives late for dinner. Guest stars: Patti LaBelle and Harold Sylvester (in his debut as Woodson Wayne). LaBelle performs "Nothing Could Be Better," from her 1990 album This Christmas.
| 81 | 12 | "War and Peace" | Peter Werner | Dominic Hoffman & Jasmine Guy | January 10, 1991 | 414 | 30.9 | 19.4/29 |
Hillman alumnus Zelmer Collier visits his childhood friend Dwayne to break the news that his Army Reserve unit is being sent to the Persian Gulf; Dwayne, Freddie, and Col. Taylor each have distinctly different responses to the news. Guest star: Blair Underwood Note: This episode aired less than a week before combat started in the Persian Gulf War.
| 82 | 13 | "Ex-Communication" | Debbie Allen | Jeannette Collins & Mimi Friedman | January 31, 1991 | 416 | 28.2 | 18.3/28 |
When Whitley's ex-boyfriend Julian arrives for a visit, she is hounded by the news that he is engaged to another girl who doesn't seem that much different from herself. Guest star: Debbie Allen, in her first recurring appearance as Whitley's therapist.
| 83 | 14 | "Risk Around the Dollar" | Art Dielhenn | Jeannette Collins & Mimi Friedman | February 7, 1991 | 413 | 26.6 | 17.4/27 |
After dipping into her tuition money to pay rent, Whitley looks for a job. She and Ron throw a party to raise money, but their plans go awry. Meanwhile, Terrence converts to Islam.
| 84 | 15 | "Love, Hillman-Style" | Neema Barnette | Gary H. Miller | February 14, 1991 | 418 | 26.6 | 17.4/27 |
Whitley organizes a "Men of Hillman" calendar and Dwayne is upset that it doesn't include him. Ron juggles three Valentine's Day dates while Jaleesa spends the holiday with Col. Taylor. Guest star: Halle Berry as Jaclyn, one of Ron's Valentine's dates.
| 85 | 16 | "A Word in Edgewise" | Debbie Allen | Glenn Berenbeim | February 21, 1991 | 417 | 27.7 | 17.3/27 |
Kim does not see the value in Matthew's drama studies until he invites a troupe of deaf actors — and one deaf rapper — to stage a local performance. Whitley bets that she can remain silent for a day.
| 86 | 17 | "Ms. Understanding" | Debbie Allen | Yvette Denise Lee & Judi Ann Mason | February 28, 1991 | 415 | 29.3 | 18.6/29 |
Sixth-year Hillman undergraduate student Shazza Zulu divides the campus along gender lines with his self-published book about the alleged shortcomings of Black men. Notes: This episode marks the first recurring appearances of Gary Dourdan (Shazza) and Ajai Sanders (Gina). The episode is a thinly veiled commentary on the controversy surrounding Shahrazad Ali's book The Blackman's Guide to Understanding the Blackwoman.
| 87 | 18 | "The Cash Isn't Always Greener" | Neema Barnette | Yvette Denise Lee | March 7, 1991 | 419 | 27.6 | 17.9/27 |
Dwayne tries to decide between a job at Kinishewa or graduate school at Hillman. Jaleesa's sister, impressed by Jaleesa's independence, contemplates some major decisions of her own. Guest star: Vanessa Bell Calloway
| 88 | 19 | "How Great Thou Art" | Neema Barnette | Jeanette Collins & Mimi Friedman | March 14, 1991 | 420 | 29.0 | 18.1/29 |
Whitley goes to her first art auction for her internship, then gets fired for bidding on a piece of art the firm didn't want. Freddie starts a radio call-in show, with little success until she invents an advice-giving Caribbean persona. Guest star: Tisha Campbell, in the first of two appearances as Josie and Josephine Premice as Urdine Abarnathy. Whitley's Mentor...In the last season she appears as a French Professor and Dwayne and Whitley's Land Lady
| 89 | 20 | "It's Showtime at Hillman" | Debbie Allen | Joe Fisch | March 21, 1991 | 403 | 27.0 | 17.2/28 |
Walter decides to arrange a telethon to raise extra money for the Outreach Center, and the Hillman students take the opportunity to showcase their individual talents. Guest star: Kiki Sheppard Notes: This episode was postponed from earlier in the season. This episode is a nod to Sinbad's role as the host of It's Showtime at the Apollo.
| 90 | 21 | "Sister to Sister, Sister" | Glynn R. Turman & John Rago | Judi Ann Mason | March 28, 1991 | 422 | 25.6 | 16.6/28 |
When Kim becomes a sorority pledge under Whitley's command, the women's friendship is tested; Ron must teach fraternity pledge Terrence a sense of humility and brotherhood toward his fellow pledges.
| 91 | 22 | "Monet Is the Root of All Evil" | John Rago | Ilunga Adell | April 4, 1991 | 423 | 26.6 | 16.9/28 |
Whitley organizes an exhibit of art by Hillman students, including starving artist Novian Winters. However, the sponsor of the exhibit considers Novian's painting to be blasphemous and demands its removal. Walter's niece visits and gets a little too friendly with Ron.
| 92 | 23 | "If I Should Die Before I Wake" | Debbie Allen | Susan Fales | April 11, 1991 | 421 | 28.2 | 19.0/32 |
Challenged by a speech-class assignment Josie reveals that she is HIV-positive, prompting her fellow students to re-examine everything they thought they knew about AIDS. Guest stars: Tisha Campbell and Whoopi Goldberg
| 93 | 24 | "Never Can Say Goodbye" | Henry Chan | Orlando Jones | April 25, 1991 | 424 | 22.5 | 15.3/26 |
As Dwayne and Whitley prepare to graduate, Ron finds out he can't join them unless he passes the European history final. Meanwhile, Walter leaves Hillman to take a job at a community center in Philadelphia. Guest star: Robert Guillaume Note: This episode marks the final appearance of Sinbad on the series.
| 94 | 25 | "To Be Continued" | Michael Peters | Glenn Berenbeim | May 2, 1991 | 425 | 24.1 | 16.3/28 |
Dwayne and Whitley evaluate their relationship in the face of a summer of separation in which she will work in New York while he remains at Hillman to teach; Kim and Matthew also are to be separated by her overseas study opportunity. Dwayne asks Whitley to marry him. Guest stars: Art Evans and Robert Guillaume Note: Final recurring appearance of Andrew Lowery (Matthew)

=== Season 5 (1991–92) ===
| No. overall | No. in season | Title | Directed by | Written by | Original release date | Prod. code | U.S. viewers (millions) | Rating/share (households) |
|---|---|---|---|---|---|---|---|---|
| 95 | 1 | "We've Only Just Begun" | Debbie Allen | Susan Fales | September 19, 1991 | 501 | 29.0 | 18.9/30 |
As the fall term starts, Col. Taylor and Jaleesa reveal that they eloped over the summer. Meanwhile, Dwayne asks Ron to pick up Whitley's engagement ring from the jeweler, but he gets the wrong one. Note: First appearance of Jada Pinkett as Lena.
| 96 | 2 | "The Dwayne Mutiny" | Debbie Allen | Gary H. Miller | September 26, 1991 | 502 | 24.9 | 16.5/27 |
Dwayne's first day as a teacher becomes disastrous when he tries too hard with his students.
| 97 | 3 | "Home is Where the Fire Is" | Debbie Allen | Yvette Denise Lee | October 3, 1991 | 503 | 25.5 | 17.4/28 |
A fire breaks out at Hillman and Lena gets the blame just because she's been cooking her special gumbo to earn extra money.
| 98 | 4 | "Almost Working Girl" | Debbie Allen | Jeannette Collins & Mimi Friedman | October 10, 1991 | 505 | 23.8 | 16.5/26 |
Whitley's employer needs a receptionist, so Whitley recommends someone from Jaleesa's temporary employment agency and Jaleesa reluctantly sends Freddie. Guest star: Beverly Todd
| 99 | 5 | "In the Eye of the Storm" | Debbie Allen | Susan Fales & Gary H. Miller & Yvette Denise Lee | October 17, 1991 | 506 | 22.3 | 15.1/23 |
A hurricane is headed straight for Hillman and Freddie and Ron are so busy arguing, they find themselves left behind at the radio station, so they only have each other to comfort.
| 100 | 6 | "Rule Number One" | Debbie Allen | Yvette Denise Lee | October 24, 1991 | 507 | 23.0 | 15.2/23 |
Dwayne offers to tutor Lena in math, but she ends up falling for him.
| 101 | 7 | "Baby, I'm a Star" | Debbie Allen | Orlando Jones | October 31, 1991 | 508 | 20.7 | 14.3/23 |
Ron's band hires Kim as their singer to increase their audience, but Kim allows the success to increase her ego. Jaleesa reveals to Col. Taylor that she's pregnant.
| 102 | 8 | "Liza Who-Little" | Debbie Allen | Dominic Hoffman | November 7, 1991 | 509 | 26.7 | 17.0/26 |
Whitley's man-hungry and materialistic cousin Liza (Jasmine Guy in a dual role) comes to visit and quickly stirs up trouble when she latches on to Ron.
| 103 | 9 | "To Tell the Truth" | Debbie Allen | Yvette Denise Lee | November 14, 1991 | 510 | 24.1 | 16.5/25 |
Anxious about the wedding plans, but unable to get Whitley to sit down and talk, Dwayne is attracted to a female graduate student he meets at a faculty mixer. Guest star: Debbi Morgan
| 104 | 10 | "Do You Take This Woman?" | Debbie Allen | Susan Fales | November 21, 1991 | 504 | 28.6 | 18.5/29 |
Dwayne's and Whitley's parents arrive for the engagement party, but their mothers continue to feud with each other. But Dwayne's growing doubts about the wisdom of the marriage and Whitley's feelings of hurt lead the couple to make a big decision on their future. Guest stars: Diahann Carroll, Patti LaBelle, Ron O'Neal, and Harold Sylvester
| 105 | 11 | "Mammy Dearest" | Debbie Allen | Glenn Berenbeim | December 5, 1991 | 511 | 26.9 | 17.5/27 |
In the wake of her breakup with Dwayne, Whitley organizes an exhibit on images of black women through history, but Kim is troubled by the inclusion of "Mammy" artifacts. Lena discovers that one of Whitley's black antebellum ancestors owned slaves. The episode also addresses the origins of "the dozens".
| 106 | 12 | "Twelve Steps of Christmas" | Bruce Kerner | Jeannette Collins & Mimi Friedman | December 19, 1991 | 512 | 24.2 | 15.2/24 |
As the newly married Taylors and Terrence prepare for their first holiday together as a family, they cannot decide how to combine traditions in a harmonious celebration. Meanwhile, Dwayne, Whitley, and Whitley's therapist are each invited and must learn to get past their differences. Guest star: Debbie Allen
| 107 | 13 | "Just Another Four-letter Word" | Peter Werner | Gary H. Miller | January 2, 1992 | 513 | 24.3 | 15.8/24 |
Ron enters a band competition to win a recording contract and enough money his half of the rent with Dwayne. Guest stars: The Boys
| 108 | 14 | "Cats in the Cradle" | Peter Werner | Gary H. Miller | January 16, 1992 | 514 | 25.2 | 15.7/24 |
While attending a Hillman football game on enemy territory, Ron and Dwayne are involved in a bias incident with three White students from the opposing school. Guest stars: Dean Cain, Ernie Sabella, and Wayne Federman (as the A&M Wolf)
| 109 | 15 | "Prisoner of Love" | Glynn Turman | Glenn Berenbeim | January 23, 1992 | 515 | 24.3 | 15.5/24 |
Freddie's ex-convict pen pal shows up at Hillman to pay a visit—evoking a variety of reactions from friends.
| 110 | 16 | "Bedroom at the Top" | John Rago | Susan Fales | January 30, 1992 | 516 | 24.8 | 15.7/25 |
Whitley is subjected to sexual harassment by her immediate supervisor; when she complains to upper management, however, he claims she was the aggressor. Guest star: Tom Wright
| 111 | 17 | "May the Best Man Win" | David Blackwell | Jeannette Collins & Mimi Friedman | February 13, 1992 | 517 | 20.5 | 13.7/21 |
Whitley and Dwayne meet one of Mr. Gaines' former employees: Hillman alumnus and Virginia state senatorial candidate Byron Douglas III. Note: First recurring appearance of Joe Morton as Byron Douglas.
| 112 | 18 | "Kiss You Back" | Debbie Allen | Yvette Denise Lee | February 20, 1992 | 518 | 20.7 | 14.0/21 |
Whitley and Byron have quickly become an item. While Byron is on a weekend business trip in Washington, D.C., Whitley tries to clear the air between herself and Dwayne. However, the night doesn't go as planned; the next morning, Dwayne is still at Whitley's place when Byron comes knocking on the door.
| 113 | 19 | "Conflict of Interest" | John Rago | Glenn Berenbeim | February 27, 1992 | 519 | 23.2 | 15.4/24 |
Whitley and Dwayne tell Byron what happened, but Whitley insists that she no longer has feelings for Dwayne. Meanwhile, Freddie and Shazza start being brutally honest all the time, which is brutally annoying to everyone else. Prospective freshmen Charmaine Brown and Lance Rodman visit Hillman. Guest stars: Allen Payne and Karen Malina White (in her first appearance on the series)
| 114 | 20 | "Sellmates" | Henry Chan | Gary H. Miller | March 12, 1992 | 520 | 20.8 | 13.7/22 |
Ron gets fired from his car salesman job when he lets a customer posing as a Harvard Business School graduate to take a car for a test drive instead of selling it--only to have Ron and the girl team up with an inventive way to get his job back. Meanwhile, Kim is concerned about her medical school prospects after receiving several rejection letters.
| 115 | 21 | "Do the Write Thing" | Otis Sallid | James E. West II | April 2, 1992 | 522 | 20.9 | 14.0/23 |
Lena writes a fictitious essay about her father's supposed exploits, for a scholarship competition, then must decide what to do when her father turns up in person to see her claim the prize.
| 116 | 22 | "Love Taps" | Kadeem Hardison | Story by : Kadeem Hardison & Ron Moseley & Reggie Rock Bythewood; Teleplay by : Reggie Rock Bythewood | April 23, 1992 | 521 | 19.0 | 13.1/22 |
When Freddie tries to learn the identity a woman she saw being beaten, Lena is shocked to realize her usually strong-willed roommate Gina was the victim. Guest star: Edafe Blackmon
| 117 | 23 | "Special Delivery" | Kadeem Hardison | Dara Marks | May 7, 1992 | 523 | 18.7 | 12.7/21 |
With only days to go before the statewide elections, Byron's campaign is shaken up by a sex scandal involving a stripper and the candidate. Jaleesa also gives birth to a daughter. Guest star: Larry Linville
| 118 | 24 | "Save the Best for Last" | Debbie Allen | Yvette Denise Lee | May 14, 1992 | 524 | 23.6 | 16.2/28 |
| 119 | 25 | "Save the Best for Last" | Debbie Allen | Yvette Denise Lee | May 14, 1992 | 525 | 23.6 | 16.2/28 |
Dwayne surprises Whitley with a visit on the night before her wedding, and their talk leads Whitley to ponder her future as she walks down the aisle: Will she choose Byron or Dwayne? Guest stars: Diahann Carroll, Bebe Drake-Massey, Orlando Jones, Barbara Montgomery, Ron O'Neal, and Michael Warren Note: This episode marks the final appearances of Dawnn Lewis, Joe Morton, and Cory Tyler on the series.

=== Season 6 (1992–93) ===
Due to declining ratings, NBC put the show on hiatus in late January 1993 and then jumped to the series finale in early May 1993 before airing out-of-order four episodes. It still left three episodes unaired that would eventually run in syndication.

| No. overall | No. in season | Title | Directed by | Written by | Original release date | Prod. code | U.S. viewers (millions) | Rating/share (households) |
|---|---|---|---|---|---|---|---|---|
| 120 | 1 | "Honeymoon in L.A. (part 1)" | Debbie Allen | Susan Fales | September 24, 1992 | 601 | 15.3 | 11.1/19 |
Everyone returns to Hillman for the start of the new school year, including newlyweds Dwayne and Whitley. A discussion of the Rodney King police brutality trial leads to the Waynes' recount of their honeymoon in Los Angeles, which coincided with the riots that ensued following the verdict. Guest stars: Sister Souljah and Gilbert Gottfried. Debbie Allen makes an uncredited cameo appearance cleaning her own star on the Hollywood Walk of Fame. Notes: Jada Pinkett (Lena), Ajai Sanders (Gina), and Karen Malina White (Charmaine) become regular cast members. First appearances of recurring cast members Bumper Robinson (Dorian), Patrick Y. Malone (Terrell), and Jenifer Lewis (Dean Davenport).
| 121 | 2 | "Honeymoon in L.A. (part 2)" | Debbie Allen | Glenn Berenbeim | October 1, 1992 | 602 | 13.7 | 9.9/17 |
Tempers flair, anxiety increases, and Dwayne and Whitley are separated as the Los Angeles riots begin around them. Freddie's summer transformation from a peace-loving hippie into a suit-wearing law school student impresses Ron but shocks Shazza. Guest stars: Gilbert Gottfried, Rondell Sheridan and Kenneth Mars. Roseanne and Tom Arnold make uncredited cameos.
| 122 | 3 | "Interior Desecration" | Debbie Allen | Jeannette Collins & Mimi Friedman | October 8, 1992 | 603 | 14.0 | 10.2/17 |
Ron mediates Dwayne and Whitley's conflict over whose belongings will go and whose will stay in their new apartment—and gets his own room downstairs. The underclassmen engage in a stepping challenge, hoping to promote unity. Guest star: Josephine Premice
| 123 | 4 | "Somebody Say Ho!" | Debbie Allen | Reggie Rock Bythewood | October 15, 1992 | 604 | 15.3 | 10.3/17 |
After Terrell is accused of taping a "digit ho" sign onto Charmaine's back during math class, a mock trial tests the students' attitudes on gender harassment and threatens Terrell's future at Hillman. At the end, Gina confesses that she, not Terrell, was the one who taped digit ho on Charmaine's back and is put on academic probation as a result. Absent: Glynn Turman.
| 124 | 5 | "Really Gross Anatomy" | Jasmine Guy | Scott Sanders | October 22, 1992 | 605 | 13.4 | 9.4/16 |
Kim has trouble dissecting her first cadaver in anatomy class, but fellow medical student Spencer Boyer helps her regain her confidence. Ron offers Kim support at home, but can't shake off his attraction to Freddie. Whitley goes on an overnight business trip, leaving Dwayne home alone for the first time. Guest star: Robert Guillaume
| 125 | 6 | "Don't Count Your Chickens Before They're Axed" | Debbie Allen | Gina Prince | October 29, 1992 | 606 | 14.6 | 9.7/15 |
Whitley convinces Dwayne to spend their savings on an expensive painting, but her professional life takes a wrong turn and the painting is later stolen in a home invasion. During a couples dinner Ron, Kim, Freddie, and Shazza try to work out their differences with each other. Guest star: Tom Wright Absent: Jada Pinkett, Ajai Sanders, and Glynn Turman.
| 126 | 7 | "The Little Mister" | Debbie Allen | Glenn Berenbeim | October 29, 1992 | 607 | 14.1 | 9.4/15 |
Dwayne scoffs at the idea of the "Year of the Woman". He then falls asleep on the couch and dreams that all of the candidates in the 1992 presidential election are women, with Whitley as "Jill Blinton", and Dwayne as her husband "Hilliard" (parodying Bill and Hillary Clinton).
| 127 | 8 | "Baby, It's Cold Outside" | Glynn Turman | Jasmine Guy | November 5, 1992 | 610 | 15.5 | 10.8/16 |
Work pressures have Dwayne showing less romantic interest in Whitley, who calls in her problem to The Montel Williams Show — unaware that Gina has organized a dorm-wide viewing party. Freddie also struggles with the need to reveal to Kim her relationship with Ron. Guest star: Montel Williams
| 128 | 9 | "Faith, Hope and Charity" | Debbie Allen | Susan Fales | November 12, 1992 | 608 | 16.9 | 11.6/18 |
| 129 | 10 | "Faith, Hope and Charity" | Debbie Allen | Susan Fales | November 12, 1992 | 609 | 16.9 | 11.6/18 |
Whitley's mother shows up for Thanksgiving with an apparent new fiancé, whose motives Whitley doubts, while Dwayne's mother likewise shows up unannounced; the fighting that ensues leads to the mothers being embroiled in a local protest for Haitian rights and being hauled off to jail. Waiting for their children to show up with bail money, the jailed mothers-in-law are shocked to learn of the recent blows to the family finances; each makes up with her child after expressing the grief she had felt over the circumstances of her only child's wedding. Revealing that he knows Freddie is cheating on him with Ron, Shazza breaks up with her. Guest stars: Diahann Carroll and Patti LaBelle Note: Carroll and LaBelle perform a duet during the closing credits.
| 130 | 11 | "Original Teacher" | Debbie Allen | Reggie Rock Bythewood | November 19, 1992 | 611 | 15.0 | 10.5/17 |
Dwayne takes on the difficult task of mentoring two teenagers from rival gangs. Guest stars: the rap duo Kris Kross, who also perform the song "It's a Shame". Absent: Charnele Brown, Ajai Sanders and Karen Malina White.
| 131 | 12 | "Occupational Hazards" | Kadeem Hardison | Jeannett Collins & Mimi Friedman | December 3, 1992 | 612 | 13.7 | 9.7/15 |
After her clothes were stolen in the home invasion, Whitley buys an expensive suit for a job interview with the intention of returning it. But she stains the suit before she can, does not get the job, and is forced to file for unemployment. Charmaine's long-distance relationship with Lance ends with a missed train and a phone call. Guest star: Alaina Reed Hall Absent: Charnele Brown and Glynn Turman.
| 132 | 13 | "White Christmas" | Debbie Allen | Glenn Berenbeim | December 17, 1992 | 613 | 12.5 | 8.4/14 |
Freddie's mother, a counselor, arrives at Christmas and immediately involves herself in everyone's personal problems, to her daughter's discomfort but others' relief; Shazza tries to woo Freddie back from Ron.
| 133 | 14 | "To Whit, with Love" | Debbie Allen | Gina Prince | January 7, 1993 | 614 | 16.3 | 10.7/17 |
Whitley takes a position teaching rebellious students at a school in a low-income neighborhood, eventually breaking through to them by teaching them African-American history not contained in their outdated textbooks. Lena's burgeoning relationship with Dorian may be threatened when he reveals that he is practicing abstinence. Guest stars: Marla Gibbs, Marques Houston, Romeo Jones, and Marquise Wilson Absent: Charnele Brown, Lou Myers, Cree Summer, and Glynn Turman
| 134 | 15 | "Happy Birthday to Moi" | Debbie Allen | Thomas Perry Dance | January 14, 1993 | 615 | 13.4 | 9.0/14 |
Disappointed with how her year has gone, Whitley determines to plan herself the best surprise birthday party ever by prying Dwayne's plans out of Kim. Meanwhile, Charmaine and Terrell take desperate measures to pass their French midterm exam. Guest stars: Josephine Premice and Edafe Blackmon
| 135 | 16 | "Mind Your Own Business" | Debbie Allen | Jeanette Collins & Mimi Friedman | January 21, 1993 | 616 | 14.3 | 9.8/15 |
Ron and Mr. Gaines purchase a nightclub together, but the cancellation of the opening night act threatens to send Ron into financial ruin. To save the day, Mr. Gaines calls in his four nerdy but talented grandnieces—Faith, Hope, Charity, and Henrietta. Guest stars: Bebe Drake-Massey, Aries Spears, and the original members of the R&B quartet En Vogue, who also perform the song "Free Your Mind". Absent: Charnele Brown and Glynn Turman.
| 136 | 17 | "Cabin in the Sky" | Henry Chan | Reggie Rock Bythewood | June 10, 1993 | 617 | 6.8 | 5.5/11 |
Strapped for cash, Whitley and Dwayne opt to share a cabin with Mr. Gaines and his wife, in an attempt at a long-delayed honeymoon. The Gaineses have a major fight over Vernon's distant relationship with their son—whom he left in charge of The Pit in his absence—and refuse to share a room, throwing a major curve into the Wayneses' plans for a romantic weekend. Guest stars: Bebe Drake-Massey and T.K. Carter Absent: Cree Summer and Glynn Turman.
| 137 | 18 | "Lean on Me" | Henry Chan | Gina Prince | May 27, 1993 | 618 | 8.9 | 6.9/14 |
Dwayne is convinced to apply for a summer job at Kinishewa...and is surprised when his ex-girlfriend Kinu shows up as the interviewer. But when he doesn't get the position Dwayne wonders is his breakup with Kinu was the root cause. Guest star: Alisa Gyse Dickens Absent: Cree Summer, Lou Myers, and Jada Pinkett.
| 138 | 19 | "Dancing Machines" | Bruce Kerner | Scott Sanders | June 3, 1993 | 619 | 9.1 | 6.6/13 |
Gina, Dorian, Lena, Charmaine and Terrell participate in a dance marathon fundraiser for Amnesty International. Ron offers his nightclub to host the event, but organizer Freddie is unconvinced that his materialistic approach to promoting is the right means to achieve her ends. Whitley agrees to look after one of her students for the weekend, and she proves to be as much of a handful at home as she is in the classroom. Guest stars: Aries Spears and John Marshall Jones Absent: Glynn Turman.
| 139 | 20 | "Great X-Pectations" | Glynn Turman | Jeanette Collins & Mimi Friedman | July 9, 1993 | 620 | 4.3 | 3.5/8 |
While preparing for a history assignment on the only meeting (March 26, 1964) between Martin Luther King Jr. and Malcolm X, Terrell and Charmaine are physically threatened by several local residents, causing Terrell to take drastic measures that could spell the end of his matriculation at Hillman; Spencer proposes marriage to Kim as often as four times a day without receiving a clear "yes". Absent: Darryl M. Bell, Cree Summer, Lou Myers, and Glynn Turman.
| 140 | 21 | "Homie, Don't Ya Know Me?" | Kadeem Hardison | Story by : Kadeem Hardison and Ron Moseley; Teleplay by : Ron Moseley | June 24, 1993 (Aired in syndication) | 621 | N/A | N/A |
Lena receives a visit by her friends from Baltimore, including ex-boyfriend Piccolo, which causes a rivalry with Dorian and a rift in Lena's other relationships. Guest stars: Shaun Baker, Monica Calhoun, and Tupac Shakur Absent: Darryl M. Bell, Cree Summer, and Glynn Turman.
| 141 | 22 | "A Rock, a River, a Lena" | David Blackwell | Glenn Berenbeim | July 2, 1993 (Aired in syndication) | 622 | N/A | N/A |
When famed singer-actress Lena Horne comes to campus, Whitley mounts an elaborate tribute with her students, but Kim is struck by Whitley's inability to pay similar respect to Ms. Horne's contemporary, Mr. Gaines. Guest stars: Lena Horne, Marques Houston, and Romeo Jones Absent: Glynn Turman.
| 142 | 23 | "College Kid" | Debbie Allen | Reggie Rock Bythewood & Gina Prince | July 10, 1993 (Aired in syndication) | 623 | N/A | N/A |
Gina, Lena, Charmaine, Dorian, and Terrell rent an off-campus apartment from a grumpy older man who turns out to be a reclusive, former professional baseball star. He is inspired to consider attending college, particularly after seeing an old flame who is now a professor. Gina's abusive ex-boyfriend returns to try to establish contact anew, frightening her and infuriating her friends. Guest stars: Billy Dee Williams, Leslie Uggams, and Edafe Blackmon Absent: Darryl M. Bell, Charnele Brown, Jasmine Guy, Kadeem Hardison, Lou Myers, Cree Summer, and Glynn Turman.
| 143 | 24 | "When One Door Closes..." | David Blackwell | Karen Kennedy | May 8, 1993 | 624 | 9.3 | 6.6/14 |
| 144 | 25 | "When One Door Closes..." | Debbie Allen | Susan Fales | May 8, 1993 | 625 | 9.3 | 6.6/14 |
Dwayne develops a grammar-baseball video game and sells it to Kinishewa, who not only buys the concept but offers Dwayne a job in Tokyo. Whitley finds out she is pregnant. The mothers-in-law and Mr. Wayne come to prepare Dwayne and Whitley for the move, then proceed to get drunk after discovering their first grandchild will be born in Japan. Ron and Dwayne have a falling out over Ron's input in creating the video game. When Ron contemplates suing Dwayne, it causes Freddie to question their relationship. Freddie gets her articles published in the Hillman legal journal and, after many tries, Kim finally says "yes" to Spencer's marriage proposal. Everyone gathers together at The Pit to give the Waynes a surprise farewell party the night before their departure. Ron and Dwayne reconcile in the final scene of the series. Guest stars: Diahann Carroll, Bebe Drake-Massey, Patti LaBelle, Josephine Premice, and Harold Sylvester Note: This hour-long episode was the series finale. Chronologically, the final events of A Different World occur here.
