= Funny or Die Presents: America's Next Weatherman =

2015 American TV series

- Genre: Reality competition
- Presented by: Matt Oberg
- Judges: Johnny Mountain; Jillian Barberie
- No. of seasons: 1
- No. of episodes: 8

Production
- Running time: 41 minutes
- Production companies: Funny or Die; United Artists Media Group

Original release
- Network: TBS
- Release: August 8 – September 26, 2015

Funny or Die Presents: America's Next Weatherman is an American reality competition hosted by Matt Oberg on TBS. Contestants compete in various challenges based on weather forecasting, in an attempt to win $100,000, an agent, and an appearance forecasting the weather on CNN's New Day. It is produced by Funny or Die and premiered on August 8, 2015.

== Episodes ==
| No. | Title | Original release date | US viewers (millions) |
|---|---|---|---|
| 1 | "Into the Storm" | August 8, 2015 | 0.73 |
| 2 | "Hang on, It's a Hurricane!" | August 15, 2015 | N/A |
| 3 | "Breaking News" | August 22, 2015 | N/A |
| 4 | "Screaming Producer" | August 29, 2015 | N/A |
| 5 | "Image is Everything" | September 5, 2015 | N/A |
| 6 | "Snownado!" | September 12, 2015 | N/A |
| 7 | "Adopt a Pet" | September 19, 2015 | N/A |
| 8 | "The Ultimate Cast Off" | September 26, 2015 | N/A |
