= Jillian Barberie =

Canadian-born American television hostess, sportscaster, radio personality and actress

- Barberie at the Red Carpet of the American Idol season 5 finale in May 2006
- Born: Jillian Marie Warry; September 26, 1966 (age 60); Burlington, Ontario, Canada
- Other name: Jillian Reynolds
- Occupations: Actress, television host, sportscaster, radio personality, model
- Years active: 1993–present
- Known for: Skating with Celebrities Sharknado: The 4th Awakens
- Television: Good Day L.A.
- Height: 5 ft 3 in (160 cm)
- Spouses: Bret Barberie (m. 1996; div. 2002) Grant Reynolds (m. 2006; div. 2014)
- Children: 2

Jillian Marie Barberie (née Warry; born September 26, 1966) is a Canadian television hostess, sportscaster, radio personality and actress. From 1995 to 2012, she was a co-host on the Los Angeles television morning news and entertainment program Good Day L.A. on Fox owned-and-operated station KTTV. From 2000 to 2005, she appeared on Fox Sports as the weather host for Fox NFL Sunday. From 2006 to 2013, she was known as Jillian Reynolds, from her second marriage.

== Early life ==
Barberie was born Jillian Warry in Burlington, Ontario, and was adopted soon after her birth. Later in life after finding her biological parents, she learned they had later married and raised two daughters. Barberie suffered some kind of abuse as a child. She graduated from Mohawk College in Hamilton, Ontario, with a diploma from its two-year program in broadcast journalism. After completing her diploma, she worked for several television stations, including The Weather Network in Montreal, Quebec, WSVN in Miami, Florida, and KTTV in Los Angeles, California.

== Career ==
Barberie has appeared on several television series including Clueless, V.I.P., and Melrose Place, as well as several comedies in the CBS comedy series Yes, Dear and the Fox sketch comedy series MADtv. She hosted the syndicated reality series EX-treme Dating. In 2000, she was hired to present the national weather segment of Fox Sports Fox NFL Sunday pre-game show, working alongside James Brown, Howie Long, and Terry Bradshaw. She became a national figure and earned significant fan interest in the male-dominated sports demographic, and several spots for Prestone antifreeze that aired during NFL game broadcasts.

In addition to Barberie's work on Good Day L.A., she worked on the national version of the show Good Day Live. However, she was ultimately fired from that show, ending her tenure on June 4, 2004.

She served as a weather and entertainment reporter for Fox Sports during the 2002 Super Bowl, the 2005 Super Bowl, and the 2008 Super Bowl. In 2005, she was Regis Philbin's co-host for his New Year's Eve special on Fox. She has appeared on the cover of Maxim magazine twice. In 2006, she participated as a contestant on the Fox reality television series Skating with Celebrities, partnered with professional skater John Zimmerman and came in second place. She was an ice skater in her childhood. Beginning in November 2006, she became the co-host of KTTV's That's So Hollywood with fellow KTTV/KCOP-TV personality, Mark Thompson.

Barberie is a former NutriSystem spokesperson appearing in commercials alongside former NFL players Dan Marino and Terry Bradshaw.

In March 2009, Barberie was also the host of American Idol Extra on Fox Reality Channel. She interviewed the eliminated participant each week and other guests who appear on the show. She has appeared alongside her then-husband, Grant Reynolds, in the Fox Reality Channel original series, Househusbands of Hollywood.

Beginning in February 2014, she co-hosted Midday Live with John Phillips on 790 KABC in Los Angeles. In January 2015, she also co-hosted The Drive Home with John Phillips on KABC until December 2018. On January 7, 2019, she co-hosted The Morning Drive with John Phillips and Randy Wang on KABC. By Mid-December 2019, KABC moved both Phillips and Wang to middays, but did not renew Barberie's contract. She has also hosted the short-lived entertainment program Hollywood Mix on KTLA.

== Personal life ==
Barberie was married to former Major League Baseball player Bret Barberie from 1996 to 2002.

She married former Marine sniper turned actor Grant Reynolds in a private ceremony on July 8, 2006. She initially stated that she was legally changing her name to Jillian Reynolds, but keeping Barberie as her professional surname.

In December 2006, People magazine said Reynolds was pregnant with her first child, due July 7. She officially announced her pregnancy the morning of December 18, 2006, during the broadcast of Good Day L.A. Barberie took a three-month maternity leave from the show beginning on June 22, 2007. On July 9, an announcement on Good Day L.A. stated that she had given birth to a girl, Ruby Raven Reynolds, on July 6, 2007. On July 6, 2009, she announced on Good Day LA that she was pregnant with her second child. She gave birth to a boy, Rocco Rio Reynolds, on January 11, 2010.

In 2011, Barberie became a naturalized citizen of the United States.

On March 15, 2013, Barberie announced that she and her husband Grant Reynolds were divorcing. The divorce was finalized on February 14, 2014.

In November 2018, Barberie announced that she has breast cancer that had spread to her lymph node. She received a double mastectomy within two weeks of the diagnosis.

Barberie and Debra Tate, sister of the late Sharon Tate and a prominent victims' advocate, have been close friends for over 21 years. Both women have publicly supported each other through their respective experiences and recoveries from breast cancer. Barberie has actively supported Tate through events, parole hearings related to the Manson Family murders, and public campaigns, including helping curate auctions of Sharon's items to assist with medical and cancer-related expenses. Barberie has hosted Tate on her podcast (Ask Jillian) to discuss Sharon's life, the Manson Family legacy, parole hearings, and the film Once Upon a Time in Hollywood.

== Filmography ==
=== Television ===
Year	Title	Role	Notes
1993-1995	Fox News at Seven	Self	
1993	Key West	Weather Reporter	
1994	Fox NFL Sunday	Jillian Warry	
1994	Beverly Hills, 90210	Jillian Warry	
1998	MTV Movie Awards	Self	
1998	Melrose Place	Self	
1999	The X Show	Self	
1999	Clueless	Jillian Barerie	
1999-2002	V.I.P.	Foxy Levin	
2000	Sexiest Bachelor in America Pageant	Self	
2002	Arli$$	Self	
2001	NASCAR on Fox	Self	
2001	The Test	Self	
2001	The Howard Stern Show	Self	
2001	Spyder Games	Reporter	
2002	EX-treme Dating	Self	
2002	The 2002 Billboard Music Awards	Self	
2002	I Love the '80s	Self	
2002	Pyramid	Self	
2003	The 28th Annual American Music Awards	Self	
2003	Stripperella	Sally Rose (voice)	
2003	Fastlane	Self	
2003	Yes, Dear	Lisa	
2003	The Jamie Kennedy Experiment	Self	
2003	MTV Icon: Metallica	Self	
2003	First Annual Miss Dog Beauty Pageant	Self	
2003	Mad TV	Mikayla	
2003	The New Tom Green Show	Self	
2003	Doggy Fizzle Televizzle	Self	
2003	The Teen Choice Awards 2003	Self	
2003	I Love the '70s	Self	
2003	The 55th Annual Primetime Emmy Awards	Self	
2003	Good Day Live	Co-Hostess	
2003	Hollywood Squares	Panelist	
2003	VH1 Big in 03	Announcer	
2003-2004	Good Morning, Miami	Joni	
2004	The 56th Annual Primetime Emmy Awards	Self	
2004	Quintuplets	Heather Daniels	
2004	Big Time	Self	
2004-2005	Eve	Shannon	
2005	Weekends at the DL	Self	
2005	Jimmy Kimmel Live!	Self	
2005	New Years Eve Live 2006	Co-Hostess	
2005	Hidden Howie: The Private Life of a Public Nuisance	Self	
2005	Related	Self	
2006	The Best Damn Sports Show Period	Self	
2006	The Big Idea with Donny Deutsch	Self	
2006	Skating with Celebrities	Self	
2006	The Tonight Show with Jay Leno	Self	
2006	Miss USA 2006	Judge	
2006	VH1 Rock Honors Pre-Show	Hostess	
2006	VH1 Rock Honors	Black Carpet Hostess	
2006	The Tyra Banks Show	Self	
2006	Gene Simmons: Family Jewels	Self	
2006	The Making of 'Scarface: The World Is Yours'	Self	
2006	That's So Hollywood	Jilian Reynolds	
2006-2012	Good Day L.A.	Self	
2007	Chelsea Lately	Guest	
2007	American Idol Red Carpet Spectacular	Self	
2008	Live from E!	Weather Guru	
2008	Fox Reality Really Awards	Hostess	
2009	23rd Annual Genesis Awards	Self	
2009	American Idol Extra	Self	
2009	Hannity	Panelist	
2009	Househusbands of Hollywood	Self	
2009	Super Dave's Spike Tacular	Self	
2009	Entertainment Tonight	Self	
2010	Tosh.0	Self	
2011	Toyota Pro/Celebrity Race	Self	
2011	The Scarface Phenomenon	Television Hostess	
2011	Keeping Up with the Kardashians	Self	
2012	Toyota Pro/Celebrity Race	Self	
2012	The Soup	Self	
2012	Hollywood Uncensored with Sam Rubin	Panelist	
2013	Hollywood Mix	Self	
2013	Interior Therapy with Jeff Lewis	Self	
2013	Celebrity Ghost Stories	Self	
2013	Hello Ross!	Correspondent	
2014	The Eric Andre Show	Self	
2015	Dinner at Tiffani's	Self	
2015	Home & Family	Self	
2015	America's Next Weatherman	Judge	
2016	Access Daily	Self	
2018	Celebrity Animal Encounters	Self	
2020-2022	Ask Jillian	Host	
2022-2023	House Hunters	Self	
2024	Still Here Hollywood Podcast	Guest	
2024	War Room: Battleground	Done with Debt Customer	
2025	The Armie Hammertime Podcast	Guest	
2025	The Adam Carolla Show	Guest	

=== Film ===
Year	Title	Role	Notes
1997	Volcano	Jillian Warry	
1998	Delivered	Fungahena Retardo	
2005	Popstar	Radio DJ	
2007	Alvin and the Chipmunks	Self	
2009	Discover	Self	
2012	Project X	Self	
2012	She Wants Me	Barbara Bernhardt	
2014	Reach Me	Anne	
2014	Catch Hell	Self	
2016	Sharknado 4: The 4th Awakens	Train Passenger	
2020	Jay Sebring.... Cutting to the Truth	Self	
2022	Without Ward	Lyra	

=== Stage ===
Year	Title	Role	Notes
2013	Flashdance On-Stage Segment	host of Hollywood Mix	
2018	KABC Subaru Live Stage		

=== Video game ===
Year	Title	Role	Notes
2006	Scarface: The World Is Yours	Femme Fatale Veronica	
