= Homeboys in Outer Space =

- Genre: Fantasy/Sitcom
- Created by: Ehrich Van Lowe
- Directed by: Albert Alarr; Gerry Cohen; Matthew Diamond; Patrick Maloney; Howard Ritter; Tony Singletary; Glynn Turman
- Starring: Flex; Darryl Bell
- Composer: Kevin Guillaume
- Country of origin: United States
- Original language: English
- No. of seasons: 1
- No. of episodes: 21 (+1 unaired pilot)

Production
- Executive producer: Ehrich Van Lowe
- Producers: Stan Foster; Lore Kimbrough; Richard G. King; Jeffrey Lampert; Miguel A. Núñez, Jr. Ted Schachter
- Running time: 22–24 minutes
- Production companies: Sweet Lorraine Productions; Touchstone Television

Original release
- Network: UPN
- Release: August 27, 1996 – May 13, 1997

Homeboys in Outer Space is an American science fiction/fantasy sitcom that aired on UPN from August 27, 1996 to May 13, 1997. The series stars comedian Flex Alexander and Darryl Bell.

== Plot ==
The plot centered around two astronauts, Tyberius "Ty" Walker (Flex) and Morris Clay (Bell), who flew around the universe in a winged car, nicknamed the "Space Hoopty", in the 23rd century. The duo's car, which was a cross between a lowrider and an 18 wheeler, was piloted by a talking female computer named Loquatia.

== Cast ==
- Flex as Tyberius "Ty" Walker
- Darryl M. Bell as Morris Clay
- Rhona Bennett as Loquatia
- Kevin Michael Richardson as Vashti
- Paulette Braxton as Amma
- Peter Mackenzie as Android Lloyd Wellington III
- Michael Colyar as Milky Ray
- James Doohan as Pippen

== Episodes ==
| No. | Title | Directed by | Written by | Original release date | Viewers (millions) |
|---|---|---|---|---|---|
| 1 | "There's No Space Like Home, or Return of the Jed Eye" | Gerry Cohen | Ehrich Van Lowe & Lore Kimbrough & Gary H. Miller | August 27, 1996 | 4.9 |
| 2 | "The Pleasure Planet Principle, or G Marks the Spot" | Gerry Cohen | Jim Bernstein & Michael Shipley | September 3, 1996 | 4.8 |
| 3 | "Papa's Got a Brand New Old Bag, or That's No Lady, That's My Grandma" | Gerry Cohen | Michael Barker & Matt Weitzman | September 10, 1996 | 4.8 |
| 4 | "Behold a Pale Planet, or What if God Was One of Us" | Matthew Diamond | Michael Price | September 17, 1996 | 4.1 |
| 5 | "Loquatia Unplugged, or Come Back, Little Cyber" | Matthew Diamond | Ehrich Van Lowe & Lore Kimbrough | September 24, 1996 | 4.1 |
| 6 | "House Party, or Play That Funky White Music Droid" | Matthew Diamond | Chuck Cummings | October 1, 1996 | 4.3 |
| 7 | "Dog Day Afternoon, or When the Going Gets Ruff" | Rae Kraus | Stu Kreisman & Chris Cluess | October 15, 1996 | 3.2 |
| 8 | "Devil in Miss Jones, or Dismember of the Wedding" | Matthew Diamond | Michael Price | October 29, 1996 | 4.5 |
| 9 | "Trading Faces, or All the King's Homeys" | Patrick Maloney | Stan Foster & Miguel A. Núñez Jr. | November 5, 1996 | 4.5 |
| 10 | "A Man's Place Is in the Homey, or The Stepford Guys" | Patrick Maloney | Gary H. Miller | November 12, 1996 | 5.0 |
| 11 | "Homeboys in Wonderland, or Hoopty Doopty" | Pat Maloney | Jeff Martin | November 19, 1996 | 3.6 |
| 12 | "Super Bad Foxy Lady Killer, or Ty and Morris Get the Shaft" | Matthew Diamond | Bernie Kukoff | November 26, 1996 | 4.3 |
| 13 | "Brother's Got No Soul, or I Love Lucifer" | Matthew Diamond | Mike Barker & Matt Weitzman | January 7, 1997 | 4.68 |
| 14 | "El Voyage Fantastico, or I've Got You Under My Skin" | Glynn Turman | Chris Cluess & Stu Kreisman | January 14, 1997 | 4.70 |
| 15 | "The Longest Yard and a Half, or The Shawshank Redemption Center" | Matthew Diamond | Ehrich Van Lowe & Gary H. Miller | January 28, 1997 | 3.64 |
| 16 | "An Officer and a Homeboy, or Full Metal Jackass" | Patrick Maloney | Michael Price & Chuck Cummings | February 4, 1997 | 4.84 |
| 17 | "Happy Happy, Droid Droid, or Amma Sees Red" | Tony Singletary | Michael Barker & Matt Weitzman | February 11, 1997 | 3.31 |
| 18 | "The Naked and the Dred, or The Toast of the Town" | Matthew Diamond | Lore Kimbrough | February 18, 1997 | 3.83 |
| 19 | "Tales from the Dark Side, or Ty Takes the Redeye" | Howard Ritter | Jim Bernstein & Michael Shipley | April 29, 1997 | 2.24 |
| 20 | "How the West Was Lost, or Daddy's Home" | Albert Alarr | Michael Price | May 6, 1997 | 3.18 |
| 21 | "The Adventures of Ratman and Gerbil, or Holy Homeboys in Outer Space" | Matthew Diamond | Ehrich Van Lowe & Gary H. Miller | May 13, 1997 | 2.81 |

== Reception ==
The series was panned by critics. Fredrick L. McKissack, Jr. of The Progressive, in an article on Black-focused television in the 1990s, described the show as "Star Trek meets Amos 'n' Andy." Keith Marder of the Daily News criticized the show for "predictable" jokes and sexual humor, rating it a "C−".
