= Househusbands of Hollywood =

Reality TV show

- Genre: Reality TV
- Starring: Billy Ashley; Danny Barclay; Darryl M. Bell; Charlie Mattera; Grant Reynolds
- No. of seasons: 1
- No. of episodes: 10

Production
- Executive producers: Marilyn Wilson; Scooter Pietsch; Lisa Bernstein; Charlie Mattera

Original release
- Network: Fox Reality Channel
- Release: August 15 – October 17, 2009

Househusbands of Hollywood is a Fox Reality Channel series that documented the lives of five househusbands and their wives and families.

== Cast ==
- Billy Ashley, a former major league baseball player who is married to a celebrity makeup artist.
- Danny Barclay, an unemployed actor whose wife is an attorney.
- Darryl M. Bell, an actor from the television series A Different World whose girlfriend is actress Tempestt Bledsoe.
- Charlie Mattera, an actor/screenwriter and "gentlemen bandit" is married to a celebrity psychologist.
- Grant Reynolds a former United States Marine Corps sniper married to TV personality Jillian Reynolds.

== Episodes ==
No.	Title	Original release date
1	"What is Househusband?"	August 15, 2009
2	"Househusbands and the Kids"	August 22, 2009
3	"Househusbands on the Weekend"	August 29, 2009
4	"Househusbands and Money"	September 5, 2009
5	"Househusbands and Sex/Romance"	September 12, 2009
6	"Househusbands and Pets"	September 19, 2009
7	"Househusbands and Hollywood"	September 26, 2009
8	"Field of Househusband Dreams"	October 3, 2009
9	"Househusbands and The Launch Party"	October 10, 2009
10	"Househusbands Reunion"	October 17, 2009
