= A Different World =

American sitcom (1987–1993)

- Genre: Sitcom
- Created by: Bill Cosby
- Starring: Lisa Bonet; Marisa Tomei; Dawnn Lewis; Jasmine Guy; Kadeem Hardison; Mary Alice; Loretta Devine; Darryl M. Bell; Sinbad; Charnele Brown; Cree Summer; Glynn Turman; Lou Myers; Ajai Sanders; Jada Pinkett; Karen Malina White
- Theme music composer: Stu Gardner; Bill Cosby; Dawnn Lewis
- Opening theme: Performed by: Phoebe Snow (season 1); Aretha Franklin (seasons 2–5); Boyz II Men and Terrence Forsythe (season 6)
- Composers: Stu Gardner; Art Lisi
- Country of origin: United States
- Original language: English
- No. of seasons: 6
- No. of episodes: 144 (list of episodes)

Production
- Executive producers: Marcy Carsey; Tom Werner; Caryn Mandabach; Susan Fales
- Camera setup: Videotape; Multi-camera
- Running time: 23–25 minutes
- Production company: Carsey-Werner Productions

Original release
- Network: NBC
- Release: September 24, 1987 – July 9, 1993

Related
- The Cosby Show; A Different World (2026)

A Different World is an American sitcom television series and a spin-off of The Cosby Show. It aired for six seasons on NBC from September 24, 1987 to July 9, 1993. The series originally centered on Denise Huxtable (Lisa Bonet) and the life of students at Hillman College, a fictional historically black college in Virginia. It was inspired by student life at historically black colleges and universities.

After Bonet's departure in the first season, the remainder of the series primarily focused more on Southern belle Whitley Gilbert-Wayne, played by Jasmine Guy, and math whiz Dwayne Wayne, played by Kadeem Hardison.

== Concept ==
While it was a spin-off from The Cosby Show, A Different World typically addressed issues that were avoided by The Cosby Show writers (race and class relations, sexual assault, or the Equal Rights Amendment). One episode that aired in 1990 was one of the first American network television episodes to address the epidemiology of HIV/AIDS.

The original premise was to focus on a white student at a historically black university and feature Lena Horne as an acting teacher, but in production, the premise changed from being a story about a white student in a black college to a black student (Denise Huxtable) in a black college with a white friend. It was ultimately decided that Denise, who was of college age, would be spun off and have a white roommate in order to show the dynamic of a white girl in predominantly black surroundings. Meg Ryan was originally cast for this role, but she decided to pursue a film career, so Marisa Tomei was cast.

=== Season two changes ===
After the first season, it came to Cosby's and the producers' attention that the series was not accurately portraying a historically black college and life on campus, so Debbie Allen, an alumna of Howard University, was hired as the chief creative officer to revamp the show. During the summer of 1988, Lisa Bonet announced that she and her husband Lenny Kravitz were having a baby. Allen was in favor of having a young pregnant student in the show, but Cosby said that Lisa Bonet could be pregnant but not Denise Huxtable.

It was felt that viewers would not accept Denise as an unwed mother, having grown to know her as a "good girl" after four seasons of The Cosby Show. Thus it was decided that Denise would drop out of Hillman, return home to her family, and eventually travel to Africa throughout the fifth season of The Cosby Show, ensuring that viewers would not see a pregnant Denise. Allen was also in favor of keeping Tomei, as she herself recalled a white student at Howard and wanted to relate that in the show and even had possible premises for her character, such as meeting Dwayne's parents and seeing the other side of racism.

However, the network rejected this storyline and the producers released Tomei from the show, and she and Marie-Alise Recasner were replaced by Cree Summer and Charnele Brown, respectively. Darryl M. Bell and Sinbad were promoted to the principal cast, and Glynn Turman and Lou Myers were added as supporting cast members. These changes led to the placement of Whitley and Dwayne at the center of a wider ensemble.

== Cast and characters ==
=== Main ===
Actor	Character	Seasons					
Actor	Character	1	2	3	4	5	6
Lisa Bonet	Denise Huxtable	Main		Guest			
Marisa Tomei	Maggie Lauten	Main					
Dawnn Lewis	Jaleesa Vinson-Taylor	Main	Main	Main	Main	Main	
Jasmine Guy	Whitley Gilbert-Wayne	Main	Main	Main	Main	Main	Main
Kadeem Hardison	Dwayne Cleofis Wayne	Main	Main	Main	Main	Main	Main
Mary Alice	Leticia "Lettie" Bostic	Main	Main				
Loretta Devine	Stevie Rallen	Main					
Darryl M. Bell	Ronald "Ron" Marlon Johnson	Recurring	Main	Main	Main	Main	Main
Sinbad	Coach Walter Oakes	Recurring	Main	Main	Main		
Charnele Brown	Kimberly Reese		Main	Main	Main	Main	Main
Cree Summer	Winifred "Freddie" Brooks		Main	Main	Main	Main	Main
Glynn Turman	Colonel Bradford Taylor		Main	Main	Main	Main	Main
Lou Myers	Vernon Gaines		Main	Main	Main	Main	Main
Ajai Sanders	Gina Deveaux				Recurring	Recurring	Main
Jada Pinkett Smith	Lena James					Recurring	Main
Karen Malina White	Charmaine Tyesha Brown					Guest	Main

=== Recurring ===
- Phill Lewis as Sam Lee (4 episodes)
- Joe Morton as Byron Douglas III (season 5)
- Cory Tyler as Terrence Taylor (seasons 4 and 5)
- Patrick Malone as Terrell Walker (season 6)
- Bumper Robinson as Dorian Heywood (season 6)
- Michael Ralph as Spencer Boyer (season 6), various characters (seasons 4 and 5)
- Gary Dourdan as Shazza Zulu (seasons 5 and 6, guest starring in episode 86)
- Marie-Alise Recasner as Millie (season 1)
- Andrew Lowery as Matthew (Freddie's cousin/Kim's boyfriend; season 4)
- Kim Wayans as Allison (season 1)
- Dominic Hoffman as Ken Souje (Season 1), Julian Day (Whitley's boyfriend, 8 episodes)
- Alisa Gyse Dickens as Kinu Owens (Dwayne's girlfriend; 9 episodes)
- Jenifer Lewis as Dean Dorothy Dandridge Davenport (9 episodes)
- Diahann Carroll as Marion Gilbert (Whitley's mother; 7 episodes)
- Patti LaBelle as Adele Wayne (Dwayne's mother; 7 episodes)
- Roger Guenveur Smith as Prof. Howard Randolph (season 4)
- Rosalind Cash as Dean Hughes (4 episodes)
- Ron O'Neal as Mercer Gilbert (Whitley's father; 4 episodes)
- Phylicia Rashad as Clair Huxtable (4 episodes)
- Jonell Green as Dashawn Curtis (4 episodes)
- Bill Cosby as Cliff Huxtable (3 episodes)
- Keshia Knight Pulliam as Rudy Huxtable (3 episodes)
- Robert Guillaume as Dean Winston and Professor Murphy (history professor/Kim's medical professor; 3 episodes)
- Harold Sylvester as Woodson Wayne (Dwayne's father; 3 episodes)
- Malcolm-Jamal Warner as Theodore Huxtable (2 episodes)

=== Guest stars ===
- Vanessa Bell Calloway as Lily Connors (season 3, episode 18) & Jaleesa's sister (Danielle; season 4, episode 18)
- Tisha Campbell as Josie Webb (2 episodes)
- Nestor Carbonell as Malik Velasquez (Whitley's mother's hired "boyfriend"; 2 episodes)
- Art Evans as Mr. Johnson (Ron's father; 2 episodes)
- IMx as Whitley's students (2 episodes)
- Richard Roundtree as Clinton Reese (Kim's father; Season 3 episodes 8 & 9)
- Halle Berry as Jaclyn (Ron's girlfriend; season 4, episode 15)
- The Boys as Mice 2 Men (singing group; season 5, episode 13)
- Dean Cain as Eddie (A&M University student; season 5, episode 14)
- Wayne Federman as A&M Wolf (season 5, episode 14)
- Ernie Sabella as Campus Security (season 5, episode 14)
- En Vogue as Faith, Hope, Charity, and Henrietta (Mr. Gaines' grandnieces; season 6, episode 16)
- Whoopi Goldberg as Dr. Jordan (professor; season 4, episode 24)
- David Alan Grier as Professor Byron Walcott (season 1, episode 9)
- James Avery as bowler (season 3, episode 4)
- Alfonso Ribeiro as Zach Duncan (prospective freshman; season 3, episode 19)
- Kristoff St. John as E.Z. Brooks, school counselor, recently transferred from California (season 1, episode 12)
- Heavy D as himself (season 3, episode 6)
- Lena Horne as herself (season 6, episode 25)
- Jesse Jackson as himself (season 2, episode 21)
- Trina McGee as Gennifer (season 5, episode 18)
- Khandi Alexander as Theressa Stone (season 2, episode 21)
- Gladys Knight as herself (season 2, episode 5)
- Kris Kross as Dwayne's juvenile mentees (season 6, episode 11)
- Tupac Shakur as Piccolo (season 6, episode 21)
- Obba Babatundé as Frank (season 3, episode 22)
- Blair Underwood as Zelmer Collier (season 4, episode 14)
- Billy Dee Williams as Langston Paige (landlord; season 6, episode 23)
- Thomas Mikal Ford as Lamar Vinson (Jaleesa's ex-husband, season 2, episode 17)
- Raven-Symoné as Olivia Kendall (Denise's step-daughter, season 3, episode 5)
- Joseph C. Phillips as Lt. Martin Kendall (Denise's husband, season 3 episode 5)

== Episodes ==
Season	Episodes	Originally released		Rank	Rating
Season	Episodes	First released	Last released	Rank	Rating
1	22	September 24, 1987	July 7, 1988	2	25.0
2	22	October 6, 1988	May 4, 1989	3	23.0
3	25	September 28, 1989	May 3, 1990	4	21.1
4	25	September 20, 1990	May 2, 1991	4	17.5
5	25	September 19, 1991	May 14, 1992	17	15.2
6	25	September 24, 1992	July 9, 1993	71	9.6

== Connections to The Cosby Show ==
As a show developed by Bill Cosby for a character from The Cosby Show, A Different World had many connections to its parent program, even before the latter program was created. The third season finale of The Cosby Show, entitled "Hillman", was essentially a pilot episode for the new show.

The theme song was co-written by Stu Gardner, Bill Cosby, and Dawnn Lewis – who was also a cast member. In the online interviews related to the 2006 "Hillman College Reunion", Lewis revealed that her being approached to write the song and to audition were two separate events that occurred within a short time of each other, such that she thought it was a practical joke by her friends.

The spin-off program featured many appearances by characters from the parent program, especially in the initial season, in which Denise's father Cliff Huxtable (Bill Cosby), mother Clair Huxtable (Phylicia Rashad), younger sisters Vanessa Huxtable (Tempestt Bledsoe) and Rudy Huxtable (Keshia Knight-Pulliam), brother Theodore Huxtable (Malcolm-Jamal Warner), and grandfather Russell (Earle Hyman) all appeared on the show, either at Hillman or at the other end of a phone call. Denise's departure from Hillman after Season 1 did not stop her mother from reappearing on the show.

Three of Phylicia Rashad's four appearances as Hillman alumna Clair Huxtable took place after season one, and in one of these, she brought her younger daughter Vanessa to tour the college. Sondra (played by Sabrina Le Beauf in the parent series) was the only Huxtable child not to appear on the show. Martin (Joseph C. Phillips) and Olivia (Raven-Symoné) appear in season 3 episode "Forever Hold Your Peace", along with Phylicia Rashad and Lisa Bonet. Elvin (Geoffrey Owens) and Pam (Erika Alexander) also never appeared on the show.

Producer/director Debbie Allen is the real-life sister of Phylicia Rashad. Allen made one guest appearance on The Cosby Show, playing an aggressive aerobics instructor who helps Clair slim down for a special occasion. Allen appeared in later seasons in a recurring role as Whitley's psychiatrist. Dwayne and Whitley also visited the Huxtable home in an episode featuring the revelation that Denise had married and would not return to Hillman.

A young Kadeem Hardison appeared on The Cosby Show as one of Theo Huxtable's friends in the first-season episode "A Shirt Story", though not playing Dwayne.

Sinbad also appeared on The Cosby Show as a car salesman in third-season episode "Say Hello to a Good Buy".

A Hillman alumna by the name of "Louise Sujay" was mentioned on both Cosby and A Different World by Clair Huxtable, Whitley Gilbert and her mother Marion.

Like Lisa Bonet, Karen Malina White brought her The Cosby Show character to Hillman. Charmaine was the best friend of Clair Huxtable's cousin Pam Tucker. White's Cosby Show costar Allen Payne turned down an offer to bring his role as Charmaine's boyfriend Lance Rodman to A Different World as a regular during Season 6, preferring instead to pursue a movie career; he and Jada Pinkett Smith starred in the 1994 film Jason's Lyric, which is considered to be a milestone in both their careers.

Payne appeared in one episode during season five in which Charmaine visits Hillman as a prospective student, bringing Lance along to see if he can gain admission as well. When Charmaine arrives at Hillman, she and Lance are maintaining a long-distance relationship and he is mentioned in multiple episodes. Lance and Charmaine later break up over the phone.

Years later, Tempestt Bledsoe (who played Vanessa on Cosby) and Darryl M. Bell (who played Ron on A Different World) became a real-life couple and co-starred on the 2009 Fox Reality Channel series Househusbands of Hollywood.

=== Hillman College ===
Hillman College is a fictional historically black college, founded in 1881 and located in the commonwealth of Virginia. The exact locality of the school is never revealed, but several geographic references are made which allude to the campus either being located somewhere in the Hampton Roads area or in the Roanoke Metropolitan Area. The school's motto is Deus Nondum Te Confecit, which literally translates from Latin to: God has not yet finished you. The school colors are maroon and white. Visual shots of the Hillman campus that were used in the series were actually filmed at two real-life Black colleges, Spelman College and Clark Atlanta University, both in Atlanta, Georgia.

The first references to Hillman on The Cosby Show were made during season one, when it is mentioned as the place where Cliff Huxtable and Clair Hanks went to school while they were engaged. Cliff's father Russell is also a Hillman alumnus. The school made its first on-screen appearance in the third-season finale of The Cosby Show, titled "Hillman", when Cliff and Clair and their family attend a Hillman commencement ceremony which also honored a retiring professor.

Monica Calhoun, who appeared as a guest star on season six episode "Homey Don't You Know Me" co-starred with Patrick Y. Malone (Terrell) on Sister Act 2: Back in the Habit and with Bumper Robinson (Dorian) in the miniseries The Jacksons: An American Dream.

Other notable connections:

Glynn Turman (Colonel Bradford Taylor) was once married to Aretha Franklin (who sang the theme from seasons 2-5) from 1978 to 1984.

== Home media ==
Urban Works released Season 1 of A Different World on DVD in Region 1 on November 8, 2005. However, this release utilizes the syndicated edits. Several release dates for a Season 2 DVD were announced (May 2006, July 2006, and September 2006), but the DVD was never released. Urban Works was acquired by First Look Studios in early 2006. The distribution rights for the series have since reverted to the production company, Carsey-Werner Productions. FilmRise has currently made the series available on streaming services, especially Amazon Prime and Netflix.

DVD title	Release date	No. of Episodes	Additional information
Season 1	November 8, 2005	22	cast interviews; out-takes; a retrospective overview of the series with cast members; an un-aired, "lost" episode featuring Tupac Shakur and Jada Pinkett-Smith

== Reception ==
=== Critical response ===
Despite strong viewership due to its timeslot, A Different World initially received negative reviews from television critics, who found it juvenile, unrealistic, humorless, boring, and overly reliant on its parent show. The first season holds an approval rating of 11% on Rotten Tomatoes, based on 19 reviews; its critical consensus reads: "Relying too heavily on the success of The Cosby Show, A Different World lacks the charisma of its predecessor, while managing to make the collegiate setting predictable and monotonous". Journalist Mark Harris reported that the show "drew one of the most concentrated doses of critical vituperation ever to greet an instant ratings hit". The Pittsburgh Post-Gazette's Ron Weiskind said the show is "at best, an average, mediocre situation comedy". Several reviewers blamed Denise's characterization and Bonet's performance for making the series' early episodes uninteresting. The Chicago Tribune wrote "it doesn't seem that Bonet is a compelling enough actress to carry a show by herself, but A Different World probably will do well because of its fortuitous time slot, and whoever said that life on television was fair?". Other reviews compared it unfavorably to The Facts of Life, including the South Florida Sun Sentinel's Bill Kelley who dismissed the show as "a greed-motivated sitcom that doesn't serve any function beyond milking a few million extra dollars from TV's most popular comedy franchise". On the contrary, television critic Marvin Kitman admitted to having been secretly enjoying the season, praising its simplicity and the performances of Bonet and Tomei in particular. Additionally, radio personalities Howard Stern and Robin Quivers lambasted the show on their talk radio program.

Critics and journalists agree that Allen's involvement and extensive revisions strengthened the quality of the show, and reviews improved from season two onward. Her direction was praised for incorporating elements such as dance and fashion, as well as raising awareness about topics particularly significant to the Black community. Dino-Ray Ramos of Entertainment Tonight said the sitcom evolved into "a fresh balance of comedy and drama that spoke true to the experiences of young black adults in the early-'90s". The series also drew acclaim for broaching topics rarely discussed on similar programs at the time, such as HIV, racism, and sexual and physical abuse. The sixth and final season has a 100% approval rating on Rotten Tomatoes.

=== Ratings ===
Critics say that A Different World benefited from airing between The Cosby Show and Cheers on Thursday night. The show consistently ranked first or second among African American viewers during most of its run.

Viewership and ratings per season of A Different World
Season	Time slot (ET)	Episodes	First aired			Last aired			TV season	Rank	Avg. HH rating
Season	Time slot (ET)	Episodes	Date	HH rating	Viewers (millions)	Date	HH rating	Viewers (millions)	TV season	Rank	Avg. HH rating
1	Thursday 8:30 p.m.	22	September 24, 1987	31.3	—N/a	July 7, 1988	17.0	—N/a	1987–88	2	25.0
2	Thursday 8:30 p.m.	22	October 6, 1988	22.7	34.3	May 4, 1989	20.7	30.8	1988–89	3	23.0
3	Thursday 8:30 p.m.	25	September 28, 1989	23.4	36.6	May 3, 1990	18.1	27.6	1989–90	4	21.1
4	Thursday 8:30 p.m.	25	September 20, 1990	18.6	28.6	May 2, 1991	16.3	24.1	1990–91	4	17.5
5	Thursday 8:30 p.m.	25	September 19, 1991	18.9	29.0	May 14, 1992	16.2	23.6	1991–92	17	15.2
6	Thursday 8:00 p.m. (Note: Episodes 1–9 and 19–21 aired on Thursday at 8:00 p.m., episodes 10–16 aired on Thursday at 8:30 p.m., and other episodes aired in various time slots.); Thursday 8:30 p.m.	25	September 24, 1992	11.1	15.3	July 9, 1993	3.5	4.3	1992–93	71	9.6

=== Media reaction ===
The Hollywood Reporter is quoted as stating that when Debbie Allen became the producer (and usually director) of A Different World after the first season, she transformed it "from a bland Cosby spin-off into a lively, socially responsible, ensemble situation comedy."

The Museum of Broadcast Communications states that Debbie Allen:

a graduate of historically black Howard University – drew from her college experiences in an effort to accurately reflect in the show the social and political life on black campuses. Moreover, Allen instituted a yearly spring trip to Atlanta where series writers visited three of the nation's leading black colleges, Clark Atlanta, Morehouse and Spelman. During these visits, ideas for several of the episodes emerged from meetings with students and faculty.

=== Impact on African-American culture ===
Because of Debbie Allen's influence as the producer (and usually director) of A Different World after the first season, African-American youth who watched the show often cite it as a defining reason why many of them decided to attend a historically Black college or university. During the show's original run between the years 1987 to 1993, there was a 24% increase in HBCU enrollment.

== Hillman College Reunion ==
In August 2006, Nick at Nite aired a week-long marathon showing episodes of A Different World. Lisa Bonet, Dawnn Lewis, Jasmine Guy, Kadeem Hardison, Darryl M. Bell, Cree Summer, and Sinbad reunited for short vignettes that provided a glimpse of the current state of their characters. Nick at Nite's "Hillman College Reunion" website added details beyond those shown on television.

== Sequel ==
On August 23 and 24, 2012, Debbie Allen, the former chief creative force of A Different World from 1988 to 1993, wrote on Twitter that she wanted to reboot the series. Over a million people on Facebook, Twitter and blogs reacted to the tweet and approved of the potential reboot.

The original cast reunited early 2024 on Today and The View to celebrate A Different World's ongoing impact and legacy. In February, they kicked off a 10-city tour stopping at many HBCUs to encourage student enrollment.

On August 7, 2024, Deadline reported that a sequel to the series was in the works at Netflix: a single-camera half-hour comedy focusing on original cast characters Whitley & Dwayne's daughter, who also attends Hillman College. Deadline indicated that the series would be written and produced by Felicia Pride, who has worked on Bel-Air and Grey's Anatomy, and that Debbie Allen, who directed the original series, would be an executive producer, along with Mandy Summers, Tom Werner, Gina Prince-Bythewood and Reggie Bythewood. On March 28, 2025, Netflix ordered a pilot of the sequel series.

In December 2025, Netflix announced that original "A Different World" stars Jasmine Guy, Kadeem Hardison, Cree Summer, and Darryl M. Bell would reprise their original roles in the sequel series. Netflix also confirmed that American singer and actress Maleah Joi Moon had been cast as Dwayne and Whitley's daughter, who would take on her college experience at the same college her parents attended, alongside new cast members Jordan Aaron Hall, Alijah Kai, and Kennedi Reece.

On May 29, 2026, Deadline reported that the sequel would premiere on September 24, 39 years to the day of the original series' premiere.

== See also ==
- Historically black colleges and universities
- List of highest-rated television pilots – On September 24, 1987, the pilot episode of A Different World became the highest-rated television pilot in history.
