= The Tempestt Bledsoe Show =

- Starring: Tempestt Bledsoe
- Country of origin: United States

Production
- Running time: 60 minutes
- Production companies: Dick Clark Productions; Columbia TriStar Television Distribution

Original release
- Network: Broadcast syndication
- Release: September 7, 1995 – June 5, 1996

The Tempestt Bledsoe Show (also called Tempestt) is an American daytime talk show presented by Tempestt Bledsoe which aired from 1995 to 1996.

== Background ==
The series was a lighter take on another talk show that was produced by Columbia/Tri-Star at the time, Ricki Lake, and as such focused on issues such as relationships, family issues, and the topics of the day. The series also aired on a majority of stations that also aired Ricki as a way to capitalize on attracting young adult and urban viewers, given Bledsoe and Lake being in their 20s. However, even with or without Lake's program as a lead-in or lead-out, Tempestt failed to win viewers over and was cancelled by June 1996.

== Reception ==
Amy Harrington of Fox News labeled it as one of the worst talk shows in (American) television history, explaining that Bledsoe lacked any sort of hook to engage viewers: "She didn't have the white trash appeal of Jerry Springer, the controversy of Rush Limbaugh, the sensationalism of Ricky Lake [sic], the hard-hitting edge of Geraldo, the red glasses of Sally Jesse Raphael, or the Oprahness of Oprah. Tempestt was relegated to the same fate as her character on Cosby — the forgotten middle child."
