= Ex-treme Dating =

- Genre: Reality television
- Directed by: Dan Riley; Daniel Adam Smith
- Presented by: Jillian Barberie
- Country of origin: United States
- Original language: English
- No. of seasons: 2
- No. of episodes: 191

Production
- Production locations: Los Angeles, California, United States
- Running time: 30 minutes
- Production companies: Small Cases Productions; Wheeler-Sussman Productions; 20th Television

Original release
- Network: Syndication
- Release: July 8, 2002 – June 4, 2004

Ex-treme Dating (styled EX-treme Dating) is an American reality television show that paired two people (one man and one woman) on a blind date. The couple was chaperoned on the date by two of the person's ex-partners. They talked to the other person via an earpiece, feeding hints for conversation topics and comments on the date itself. At the end of the date, one person waited for a limousine. If the other person was in the car, the couple got a second date paid for by the show. If the person's ex-partners were in the car, the ex-partners themselves won a prize.

The show was hosted by Jillian Barberie and premiered on July 8, 2002. The series ended on June 4, 2004 after two seasons.

The series has previously been in reruns on the now-defunct Fox Reality Channel.
