= Billy Ashley =

American baseball player (born 1970)

- Left fielder
- Born: July 11, 1970 (age 56); Trenton, Michigan, U.S.
- Batted: Right Threw: Right

MLB debut
- September 1, 1992, for the Los Angeles Dodgers

Last MLB appearance
- July 30, 1998, for the Boston Red Sox

MLB statistics
- Batting average: .233
- Home runs: 28
- Runs batted in: 84
- Stats at Baseball Reference

Teams
- Los Angeles Dodgers (1992–1997); Boston Red Sox (1998)

Billy Manual Ashley (born July 11, 1970) is an American former professional baseball outfielder. He played in Major League Baseball for the Los Angeles Dodgers and Boston Red Sox.

== Minor leagues ==
Ashley was drafted by the Los Angeles Dodgers in the 3rd round of the 1988 MLB draft. He started his professional career with the Gulf Coast Dodgers in 1988 and 1989. He played with the Bakersfield Dodgers in 1990, the Vero Beach Dodgers in 1991, the San Antonio Missions in 1992 and the Albuquerque Dukes for most of 1992–1994. Ashley hit 24 home runs with San Antonio in 1992, 26 with the Dukes in 1993 and 37 in 1994.

He was a Triple-A All-Star and Pacific Coast League All-Star in 1993 and 1994. Also in 1994, he was selected a Baseball America first team Minor League All-Star, the Pacific Coast League MVP, Los Angeles Dodgers Minor League Player of the Year in and Triple-A Player of the Year. He is one of three Dodgers position players to have been twice selected as the organization's Minor League Player of the Year, along with Joc Pederson and Paul Konerko.

== Major leagues ==
Ashley made his major league debut on September 1, 1992, against the Chicago Cubs and recorded his first major league hit on September 6 against the Pittsburgh Pirates. Ashley made the Dodgers Opening Day roster for the 1995 season and for the next three seasons was a spot starter/pinch hitter for the Dodgers. He tied the Dodgers single-season record for pinch-hit homers in 1996. The Dodgers released him before the beginning of the 1998 season.

Ae was signed as a free agent by the Boston Red Sox. He spent most of the season with the Triple-A Pawtucket Red Sox but played in 13 games with the major league team. His most productive day with the Red Sox was on July 3, 1998, when went 3 for 4 and hit a grand slam home run against the Chicago White Sox.He spent 1999 with the Toledo Mud Hens in the Detroit Tigers farm system and then retired from baseball.

Throughout his Minor League career, Ashley was a highly touted power-hitting prospect. His success in the minors did not transfer to the big league level, however, and he did not accumulate a batting average higher than .237 or hit more than 9 home runs in a season. His career concluded with 144 total hits and 236 total strikeouts. He did, however, achieve a measure of notoriety for a time as a pinch-hitter.

== Miscellaneous ==
Ashley was featured in the Fox Reality Channel's original series Househusbands of Hollywood. As of 2015, he is the baseball head coach for Malibu High School in Malibu, California. As of 2015, Ashley is also serving as an Alumni member of the Los Angeles Dodgers Community Relations team.
