= Darryl M. Bell =

American actor

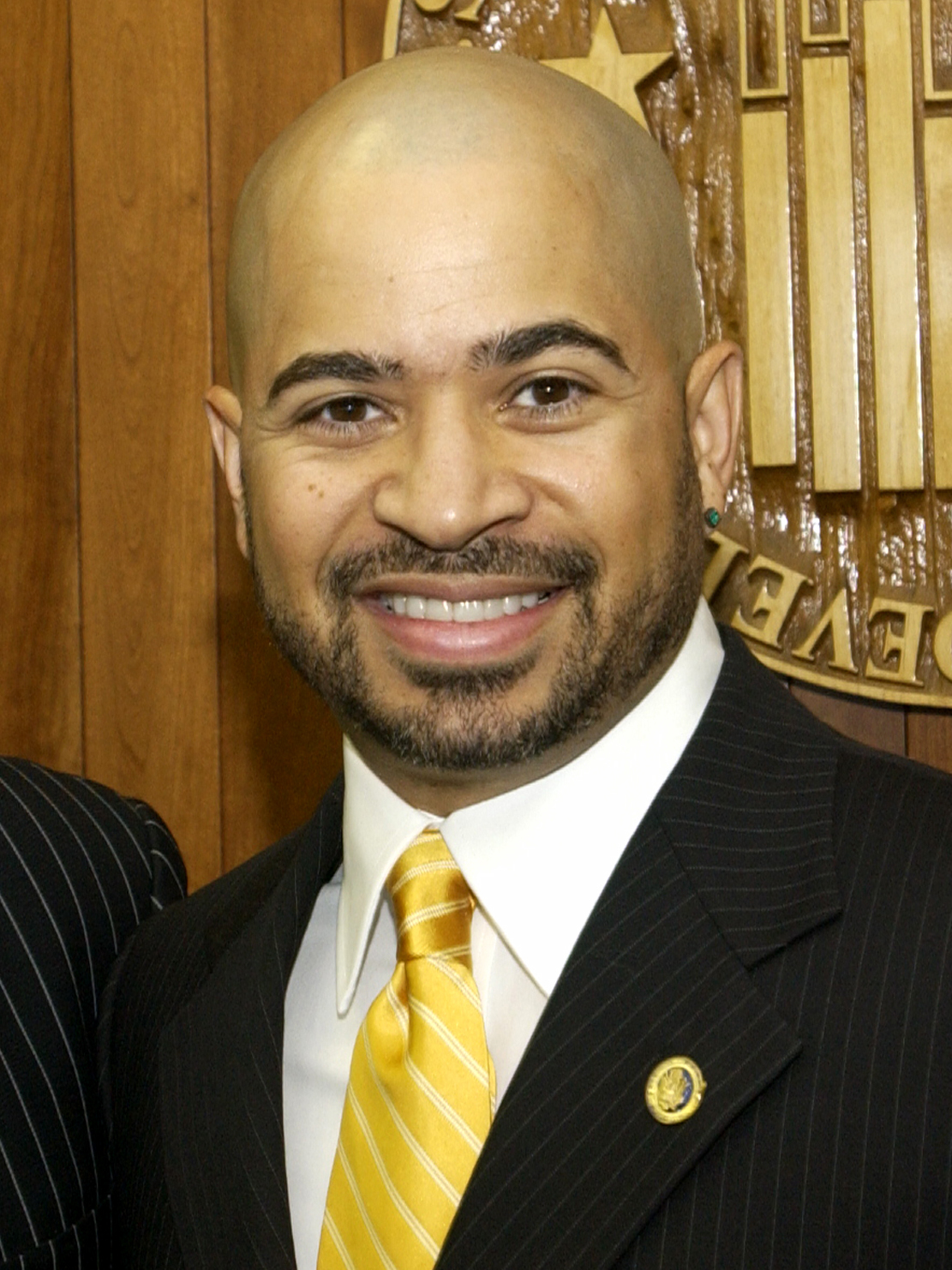
- Bell in 2006
- Born: May 10, 1963 (age 63); Chicago, Illinois, U.S.
- Other name: Daryl Bell
- Education: Delbarton School; Syracuse University
- Occupation: Actor
- Years active: 1987–present
- Partner: Tempestt Bledsoe (1993–present)

Darryl M. Bell (born May 10, 1963) sometimes credited as Daryl Bell; is an American actor. He is best known for his roles as Big Brother X-Ray Vision in the 1988 Spike Lee film School Daze and as Ron Johnson Jr. in the NBC sitcom A Different World (1987–1993).

Bell also starred in the UPN sitcom Homeboys in Outer Space (1996–1997) as Morris Clay and in the 2009 Fox Reality Channel show Househusbands of Hollywood with his wife Tempestt Bledsoe.

== Early and personal life ==
Bell was born as the son of Travers J. Bell Jr., the founder of the first black firm on the New York Stock Exchange. Bell graduated from Delbarton School in Morristown, New Jersey in May 1981, where he was one of four African American students, accounting for 1% of the school's enrollment. Bell also attended Syracuse University. Bell is a member of Alpha Phi Alpha, having pledged the fraternity through the Delta Zeta chapter in Spring 1982. He is in a 30 year-long committed relationship with actress Tempestt Bledsoe, who co-starred in the NBC TV comedy The Cosby Show. The couple appeared together in the Fox reality TV series Househusbands of Hollywood, that debuted in August 2009.

== Filmography ==
=== Film ===
Year	Title	Role	Notes
1988	School Daze	Big Brother X-Ray Vision	
1994	Mr. Write	Lawrence	
2000	Brother	Yamomoto's Henchman	
2013	The Dark Party	Danny	

=== Television ===
Year	Title	Role	Notes
1987–93	A Different World	Ron Johnson	103 episodes
1995	Black Scorpion	E-Z Street	
1996	Living Single	John	Season 3, Dear John
1996–97	Homeboys in Outer Space	Morris Clay	21 episodes
1997	Cosby	Julius	3 Episodes
1999	For Your Love	Floyd Huxtable III	Seasons 2, Van For All Seasons
2004	Beverly Hills S.U.V.		TV movie
2009	Househusbands of Hollywood	Himself	TV Reality Show
2026	A Different World (2026)	Ron Johnson	A Different World revival
