= Tempestt Bledsoe =

American actress (born 1973)

- Born: August 1, 1973 (age 53); Chicago, Illinois, U.S.
- Education: New York University
- Occupation: Actress
- Years active: 1984–present
- Partner: Darryl M. Bell

Tempestt Bledsoe (born August 1, 1973) is an American actress. She is best known for her childhood role as Vanessa Huxtable, the fourth child of Cliff and Clair Huxtable on the NBC sitcom The Cosby Show (1984–92). In December 2010, it was announced that Bledsoe would be the host of Clean House on the Style Network, replacing Niecy Nash. From September 2012 to February 2013, she was one of the stars of the NBC TV sitcom Guys with Kids, portraying Marny.

== Career ==
In 1984, Bledsoe was cast in the role of Vanessa Huxtable on the sitcom The Cosby Show. She was a regular until its final season in 1992. She also made a one-time appearance as Vanessa on A Different World. In 1986, Tempestt played the role of Grace Wheeler in season 15, episode 4 "(The Gift of Amazing Grace)", of the ABC Afterschool Special program. In 1989 she was a national spokesperson for DARE.

In the mid-1990s, from 1995 to 1996, Bledsoe hosted a daytime talk show, The Tempestt Bledsoe Show, produced by Columbia TriStar Television and Dick Clark. She made a brief appearance in the sitcom The Parkers, and has been featured in the recurring role of a single mother on the ABC show The Practice.

She also appeared in the Lifetime show Strong Medicine, and South of Nowhere. Her most recent credits include the role of Nina in the Oxygen's original television movie Husband for Hire, Steven Bochco's Raising the Bar, and the role of Abby in the second season of Disney Channel's animated series The Replacements. She appeared on VH1's Celebrity Fit Club and NBC's Fear Factor.

It was announced on December 1, 2010 that Bledsoe would return to TV, replacing Niecy Nash as the host of Clean House on Style Network. Her first episode aired on January 26, 2011. In 2012, Bledsoe was heard as the voice of Sheriff Hooper in the Laika animated film ParaNorman.

From September 2012 to February 2013, she portrayed Marny in the NBC TV sitcom Guys with Kids.

In 2014, Bledsoe appeared in the Instant Mom episode "Not Your Mother's Day" in which she reprised her role as Vanessa Huxtable. In July 2019 Bledsoe appeared in the Netflix show Family Reunion episode 10 "Remember When Our Boys Became Men?".

== Filmography ==
Film
Year	Title	Role	Notes
1987	Looking Good!	Herself	Exercise Video
1988	Dance til' Dawn	Margaret	
1998	Johnny B Good		
2003	BachelorMan	Janey	
2010	N-Secure	Jill	
2012	ParaNorman	Sheriff Hooper	Voice
2018	Jingle Belle	Jackie	

Television
Year	Title	Role	Notes
1984–1992	The Cosby Show	Vanessa Huxtable	Main role – 157 episodes
1985	NBC Special Treat	Herself / Interviewee	Season 9 episode 4: "Kids Just Kids"
1985	Andy Williams and the NBC Kids Search for Santa	Herself	Christmas special
1985	One to Grow On	Herself	Episode: "Making Money"
1986	Sesame Street	Herself	Recurring Guest
1986–1988	Hollywood Squares	Herself / Panelist	2 episodes
1986–1994	ABC Afterschool Special	Grace Williams / Herself	3 episodes
1988	Dance 'til Dawn	Margaret	TV movie
1988	Monsters	Dottie	Season 1 episode 5: "My Zombie Lover"
1989	A Different World	Vanessa Huxtable	Season 2 episode 13: "Risky Business"
1989	Dream Date	Danni Fairview	TV movie
1990	The Earth Day Special	Vanessa Huxtable	
1995	The Fresh Prince of Bel-Air	Herself	Season 5 episode 25: "For Whom the Wedding Bells Toll"
1995–1996	The Tempestt Bledsoe Show	Host	Also known as Tempestt
1997	Jenny	Kaylene	Episode 5: "A Girl's Gotta Live in the Real World"
1998	The Practice	Roberta Baylor	3 episodes
1999	The Parkers	Neena Davis	Season 1 episode 9: "And the Band Plays On"
1999	Santa and Pete	Maria Dangola	TV movie
2000	The Expendables	Tanika	TV movie
2001	Fire & Ice	Pam Moore	TV movie
2002	The Cosby Show: A Look Back	Herself / Vanessa Huxtable	
2003	Pet Star	Herself / Celebrity Judge	3 episodes
2004	Rock Me Baby	Chloe	Episode 13: "Pretty Baby"
2005	Strong Medicine		Season 6 episode 3: "Clinical Risk"
2006	South of Nowhere	Cecily	3 episodes
2008	Husband for Hire	Nina	TV movie
2008	Raising the Bar	Camilla Hansen	Season 1 episode 7: "A Leg to Stand On"
2008–2009	The Replacements	Abbey / Claudia / Abbey-clone	Voice; 21 episodes Replaced Erica Hubbard for season 2
2009	Househusbands of Hollywood	Herself	9 episodes
2009	The Wishing Well	Enid	Aired in the United Kingdom in 2009 and the United States in 2010
2010–2011	Clean House	Host	12 episodes
2011	Vietnam in HD	Elizabeth Allen	Also known as Vietnam Lost Films; 6 episodes
2012–2013	Guys with Kids	Marny	
2014	Instant Mom	Vanessa Huxtable	Season 1 episode 20: "Not Your Mother's Day"
2019	Family Reunion	Katrina	Episode 10: "Remember When Our Boys Became Men?"

== Personal life ==
Bledsoe earned a bachelor's degree in finance from New York University. Since 1993 she has been in a relationship with actor Darryl M. Bell, who co-starred in the NBC TV comedy A Different World, a spinoff of The Cosby Show. The couple appeared together in the Fox Reality Channel series Househusbands of Hollywood, which debuted August 2009. Bledsoe is a vegetarian.
