= Marie-Alise Recasner =

American soap opera actress

- Born: USA
- Occupation: Actress
- Years active: 1982-1999

Marie-Alise Recasner is an American former actress, best known as Alice Jackson on Santa Barbara from 1986 to 1987. She also had a recurring role as Millie on the sitcom A Different World.

In 1998, Recasner became the second actress to portray Ellen Burgess on Port Charles. She also played Lynne Burke on Days of Our Lives. She appeared on the sitcom Benson in 1986 as LaToya season 7 episode 12 "Summer of Discontent" playing the part of Benson's nephew's girlfriend. She appeared on Gimme a Break! in 1985 as Tammy season 5 episode 2 “Ship of Fools: Part 1 & 2” playing the part of Nell’s ex-husband‘s 18-year-old wife.

== Personal life ==
As of 1998, Recasner was a divorced mother of two children.
