= List of Morehouse College alumni =

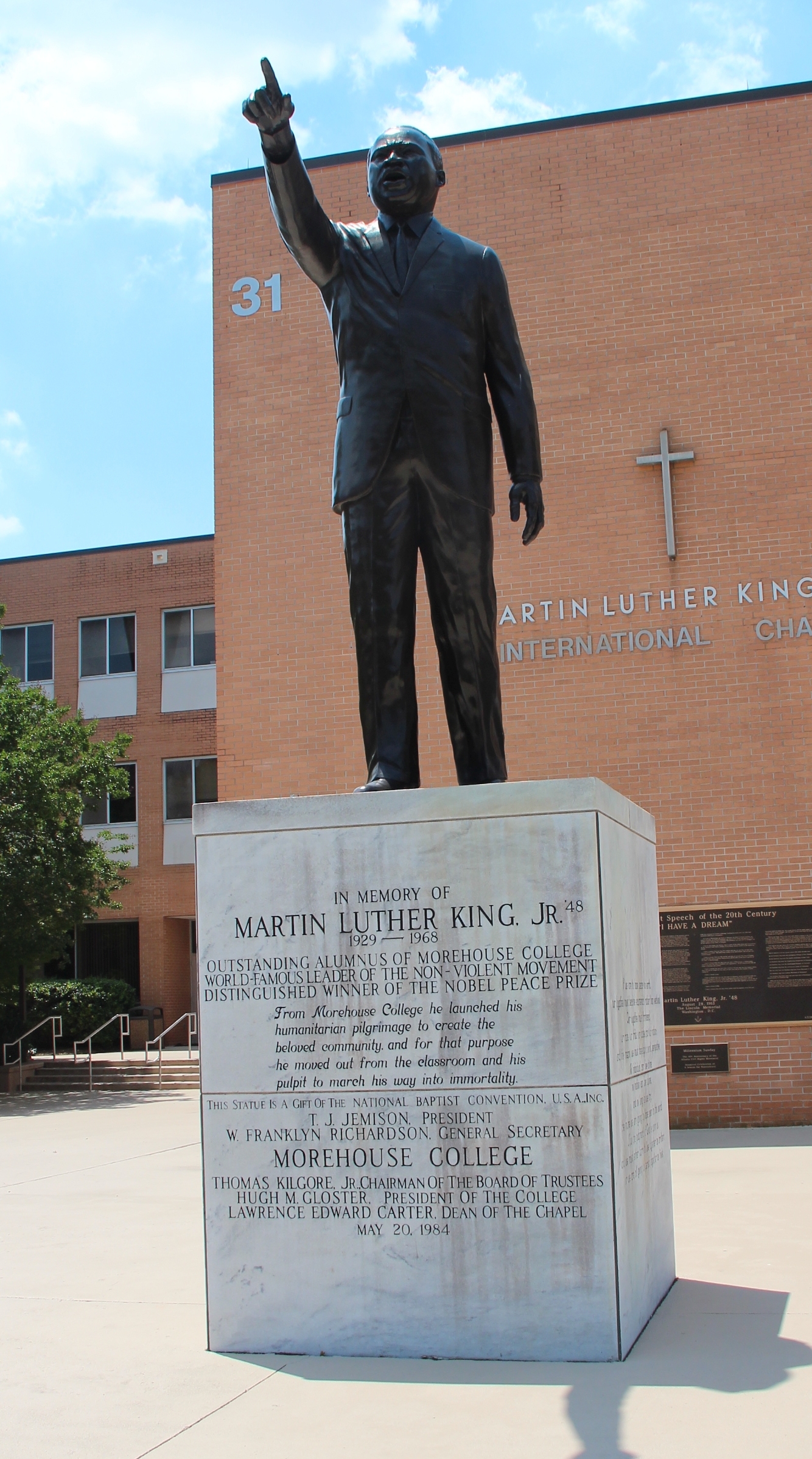
Statue of Martin Luther King Jr. on the Morehouse campus

This is a list of notable alumni including currently matriculating students and alumni who are graduates or non-matriculating students of Morehouse College.

Morehouse College is a private, four-year, all-male, historically black college in Atlanta, Georgia. During enrollment, students are known as "Men of Morehouse." Upon graduation, alumni are ceremoniously initiated as lifetime "Morehouse Men." There are over 20,000 alumni of Morehouse College, and dozens of alumni chapters established across the U.S. and a few foreign countries.

See also Morehouse College alumni.

== Academia ==
Name	Class year	Notability	Reference(s)
Russell L. Adams	1952	chair, Department Afro-American Studies, Howard University (1971–2005); professor emeritus, Howard University	
Benjamin G. Brawley	1901	first dean of Morehouse College	
Calvin O. Butts	1972	president, SUNY College at Old Westbury; pastor, Abyssinian Baptist Church	
James A. Colston	1932	2nd president, Bethune-Cookman University; president, Knoxville College; president, Savannah State University; 2nd president, Bronx Community College	
John W. Davis	1911	president of West Virginia State College (1919–1953)	
Albert W. Dent	1926	president of Dillard University, chief executive of Flint-Goodridge Hospital, advocate for education and healthcare of impoverished people	
Marvin Dunn	1961	historian, psychologist, professor emeritus at Florida International University	
Eddie Glaude	1989	chair, Center for African American Studies and Professor at Princeton University; guest contributor on The Tavis Smiley Show	
William E. Holmes		former president of Central City College, faculty of the Atlanta Baptist Institute for 25 years	
John Hopps Jr.	1958	former director of the Charles Stark Draper Laboratory and Distinguished Physics Professor at the Massachusetts Institute of Technology; recipient of the Materials Advancement Award	
William M. Jackson	1956	founder of National Organization for the Professional Advancement of Black Chemists and Chemical Engineers and Emile A. Dickenson Professor at the University of California, Davis; fellow of the American Association for the Advancement of Science	
Mordecai Wyatt Johnson	1911	first African-American president of Howard University	
Michael A. Lindsey	1994	dean of New York University Silver School of Social Work (2022–present)	
Calvin Mackie	1990	former professor of Engineering, Tulane University; winner of the 2003 Presidential Award for Excellence in Science, Mathematics and Engineering; Black Engineer of the Year for College Level Educators	
Walter E. Massey	1958	president, School of the Art Institute of Chicago; former professor of Physics at the University of Chicago; former dean of the College of Physics at Brown University; former provost of the University of California System; president emeritus at Morehouse College	
James Nabrit Jr.	1923	second African-American president of Howard University and former Deputy United Nations Ambassador	
Kevin D. Rome	1989	former president of Lincoln University (2013–2017); former president of Fisk University (June 2017–August 2020)	
A. Benjamin Spencer	1996	first black dean of William & Mary Law School (2020–present)	
Ronald S. Sullivan Jr.	1989	first African American faculty dean, Harvard College; professor, Harvard Law School and director of the Criminal Justice Inst. at Harvard Law; legal analyst for CNN, Fox News; legal representative for Harvey Weinstein	
James F. Williams	1966	dean of Libraries at University of Colorado at Boulder, 2002 Melvil Dewey Medal recipient	
Charles V. Willie	1948	distinguished professor emeritus, Harvard University Graduate School of Education	
John Silvanus Wilson	1979	Ph.D, 11th president of Morehouse College, former executive director, White House Initiative on HBCUs	

== Business ==
Name	Class year	Notability	Reference(s)
Herman Cain	1967	former CEO of Godfather's Pizza and 2012 Republican presidential candidate	
James Compton	1961	board of directors, Ariel Investments, Inc.; retired president and CEO, Chicago Urban League	
Walter E. Massey	1958	former chairman, Bank of America; former director of the National Science Foundation	
Karim Webb		restaurateur	

== Entertainment, media, and literature ==
Name	Class year	Notability	Reference(s)
Lerone Bennett Jr.	1949	senior editor for the Johnson Publishing Group (JET, Ebony); author of Before the Mayflower	
Fonzworth Bentley	1997	media personality	
Sanford Biggers	1992	artist, professor at Columbia University School of the Arts	
Byron Cage	1987	Grammy-nominated gospel singer; NAACP Image Award nominee; winner of six Stellar Awards	
Michael DeMond Davis	1961		
Thomas Dent	1952	writer and poet; author of Magnolia Street	
Rockmond Dunbar	1991	actor, Soul Food, Girlfriends	
John Warren Davis	1911	president of West Virginia State College (1919–1953)	
Tope Folarin	2004	Nigerian-American writer	
Guru (born Keith Elam)	1983	rapper, founder of Gang Starr	
Brian Tyree Henry	2004	actor, Atlanta	
Wendell Holland	2006	winner of the thirty-sixth season of Survivor	
Samuel L. Jackson	1972	actor	
Edmund Jenkins	1914	Harlem Renaissance composer, studied under Kemper Harreld	
Robert E. Johnson	1948	former executive editor and associate publisher, Jet Magazine	
Canton Jones	1985	Grammy-nominated gospel singer	
Erik King	1985	actor, Dexter	
Spike Lee	1979	film director and producer	
Miles Marshall Lewis	1993	pop culture critic, essayist, and author	
Seith Mann	1995	television director: The Wire, Grey's Anatomy; winner of the NAACP Image Award	
Martin Luther McCoy	1992	musician and actor	
PJ Morton	2003	Grammy Award-winning Maroon 5 keyboardist and artist	
Bill G. Nunn III	1976	actor, School Daze, Mo' Better Blues, New Jack City	
Babatunde Olatunji	1954	Grammy Award-winning Nigerian drummer, social activist and recording artist; Drums of Passion	
Kevin A. Ross	1985	host/executive producer of daytime syndicated legal show America's Court with Judge Ross	
Shakir Stewart	1996	senior vice president of Island Def Jam Music Group, executive vice president of Def Jam	
Vincent Tubbs	c.1938	co-founder of National Negro Newspaper Week and first African American to head a motion picture industry union	
John David Washington	2006	actor, BlacKkKlansman, Tenet	
Saul Williams	1994	performing artist and actor	

== Government, law, and public policy ==
Name	Class year	Notability	Reference(s)
Sanford Bishop	1968	U.S. congressman (Georgia)	
Claude Black Jr.	1937	first Black mayor pro tem San Antonio, Texas; civil rights leader; pastor of Mt. Zion Baptist Church, San Antonio, Texas	
A. Scott Bolden	1984	attorney and television political commentator	
Julian Bond	1971	civil rights leader, former Georgia state representative and chairman of the NAACP	
Nicholas W. Brown	1999	President Joe Biden-appointed United States attorney for the Western District of Washington	
Terrance Carroll	1992	speaker, Colorado House of Representatives	
Julius E. Coles	1964	former U.S. ambassador to Senegal; former president of Africare	
George Crockett III	1961	judge, Recorder's Court (Detroit); served on the same bench as his father, Judge George Crockett Jr.	
George W. Crockett Jr.	1931	former U.S. congressman; founding member of the National Lawyer's Guild; civil rights activist; co-founded the first racially integrated law firm in the U.S.; first Black attorney in the U.S. Department of Labor	
John Wesley Dobbs	1897	unofficial "mayor" of Sweet Auburn Avenue (1937–1949); civic leader and co-founder of the Atlanta Negro Voters League	
Kenneth Dunkin	1989	member, Illinois House of Representatives	
Lee Harris	2000	7th mayor of Shelby County, Tennessee	
Ralph B. Everett	1973	president and CEO, Joint Center for Political and Economic Studies	
Joseph Jerome Farris	1951	judge, United States Court of Appeals 9th Circuit	
George Haley	1949	former chair of U.S. Postal Rate Commission and ambassador to the Republic of Ghana; brother of Alex Haley	
David Haley	1981	State of Kansas Senator and son of George Haley	
James R. Hall	1957	retired United States Army lieutenant general, final commander of the Fourth United States Army	
Marqueece Harris-Dawson	1995	president of the Los Angeles City Council	
Kirk Hatcher	1988	Alabama senator for the 26th district	
Earl F. Hilliard	1964	former U.S. congressman (Alabama)	
El-Mahdi Holly	1998	member, Georgia House of Representatives	
Edward S. Hope	1923	engineer, educator, first African American lt. commander in the United States Navy	
John Hopps Jr.	1958	former deputy undersecretary, United States Department of Defense	
Odell Horton	1951	judge, U.S. District Court W. Tenn.	
Maynard Jackson	1956	first Black mayor of Atlanta, Georgia; served three terms as mayor; founder and CEO of Jackson Securities Inc.; National Development Chair, Democratic National Committee	
Jeh Johnson	1979	secretary of Homeland Security; first black partner, Paul, Weiss, Rifkind, Wharton & Garrison LLP, named to the National Law Journal's 50 Most Influential Minority Lawyers; appointed general counsel for the Defense Department by President Barack Obama; former general counsel for U.S. Air Force	
Marlon Kimpson	1991	South Carolina Senate member and attorney	
Reginald C. Lindsay	1967	judge, United States Court of Appeals 7th Circuit	
C. Vernon Mason	1967	former lawyer, Tawana Brawley case, Howard Beach incident	
Rich McCormick	2010	U.S. representative from Georgia (2023–present)	
Ed McIntyre	1956	first African-American mayor of Augusta, Georgia	
John Monds	1987	received highest number of votes received by any Libertarian candidate ever	
James Nabrit Jr.	1923	former deputy U.S. ambassador to the United Nations; second African American president of Howard University	
Julien Xavier Neals	1986	first U.S. federal judge confirmed during Joe Biden's presidency	
Major Owens	1956	U.S. congressman (New York)	
Ernest Page	1964	first Black mayor of Orlando, Florida	
Graham T. Perry	1923	first African American assistant attorney-general for State of Illinois	
Frank Peterman	1985	member, Florida House of Representatives	
Steven Reed	1998	first African-American mayor of Montgomery, Alabama	
Cedric Richmond	1995	U.S. congressman (Louisiana)	
Sebastian Ridley-Thomas	2009	member, California State Assembly	
David Satcher	1963	16th U.S. Surgeon General, former president of Morehouse School of Medicine	
Bakari Sellers	2005	youngest member elected to the South Carolina General Assembly and TV political comementator	
James H. Shelton III	1989	former deputy secretary of Education for the United States	
Jamal Simmons	1993	political advisor and communications director	
Louis W. Sullivan	1954	former U.S. Secretary of Health and Human Services and current president emeritus of Morehouse School of Medicine	
Andre Thapedi	1990	member, Illinois House of Representatives	
Perry Thurston	1982	member, Florida House of Representatives	
Horace T. Ward	1927	first African American to challenge the racially discriminatory practices at the UGA School of Law; first African-American appointed to the United States District Court for the Northern District of Georgia; former member of the Georgia Senate; inducted into the National Bar Association Hall of Fame; recipient of the Trumpet Award for Civil Rights Advocacy	
Raphael Warnock	1991	first Democratic U.S. African-American Senator elected in the South	
Randall Woodfin	2003	29th mayor of Birmingham, Alabama	
S. Howard Woodson	1942	Bachelor of Divinity, Morehouse School of Religion; former speaker, New Jersey General Assembly	

== Religion ==
Name	Class year	Notability	Reference(s)
J. Pius Barbour	1917	pastor of Calvary Baptist Church; executive director of National Baptist Association; editor of National Baptist Voice; mentor to Martin Luther King Jr.	
Harrison N. Bouey	1873	pastor and missionary	
Amos C. Brown	1964	pastor, Third Baptist Church of San Francisco; president, San Francisco branch of NAACP	
Calvin O. Butts	1972	pastor of Abyssinian Baptist Church in Harlem, New York; President of the State University of New York College at Old Westbury; chairman and founder of the Abyssinian Development Corporation, an engine for $500 million in housing and commercial development in Harlem	
W. Sterling Cary	1949	president of the National Council of Churches from 1972 to 1975	
A. D. King	1959	brother of Martin Luther King Jr. and served as pastor of several churches	
Martin Luther King Sr.	1931	father of Martin Luther King Jr. and senior pastor of Ebenezer Baptist Church	
Otis Moss III	1992	pastor, Trinity United Church of Christ; listed on the Root 100	
Kelly Miller Smith	1942	assistant dean, Vanderbilt University Divinity School (circa 1970s–1980s)	
Howard Thurman	1923	theologian; dean of chapel, Boston University	
Raphael Warnock	1991	senior pastor of Ebenezer Baptist Church in Atlanta and United States Senator (D-GA)	
Frederick B. Williams	1959	canon of the Church of the Intercession in Harlem, New York (1971–2005)	

== Science and medicine ==
Name	Class year	Notability	Reference(s)
Angela Doyinsola Aina	2011	co-founder and executive director of the Black Mamas Matter Alliance	
Dustin T. Duncan	2005	professor of Epidemiology, Columbia University;	
Henry W. Foster Jr.	1954	president emeritus, Meharry Medical College; clinical professor, Vanderbilt University; former nominee for post of U.S. Surgeon General; presidential advisor	
Corey Hébert	1991	celebrity physician, radio talk show host, Chief Medical Editor for National Broadcasting Company for the Gulf Coast, first Black Chief Resident of Pediatrics at Tulane University, chief executive officer of Community Health TV	
Donald Hopkins	1962	director and vice president, Health Programs, the Carter Center; a 1995 MacArthur Fellow; nominated for the Pulitzer Prize in 1983	
John Hopps Jr.	1958	physicist, former longtime director of the Charles Stark Draper Laboratory and distinguished professor at the Massachusetts Institute of Technology (MIT); recipient of the National Materials Advancement Award; former deputy under secretary for the United States Department of Defense	
Calvin B. Johnson	1989	24th secretary of Health for the Commonwealth of Pennsylvania of the Pennsylvania Department of Health	
Samuel M. Nabrit	1925	distinguished science professor; first African-American appointed to the U.S. Atomic Energy Commission; served on Dwight Eisenhower's National Science Board; first African-American to receive a doctoral degree from Brown University; first African-American to serve as Trustee at Brown University; second president of Texas Southern University	
Roderic I. Pettigrew	1972	cardiologist and renowned biomedical engineer; director, National Institute of Biomedical Imaging and Bioengineering; former director of Magnetic Resonance Research and professor of Radiology and Cardiology at Emory University School of Medicine; listed annually among the "Best Doctors in America"	
Charles DeWitt Watts	1938	first board-certified African-American surgeon in North Carolina; founder of Lincoln Community Health Center	
Asa G. Yancey Sr.	1937	first African-American professor and Professor Emeritus at Emory University School of Medicine, first African-American doctor and Medical Director at Grady Memorial Hospital	

== Service and social reform ==
Name	Class year	Notability	Reference(s)
Hamilton Holmes	1963	desegregated the University of Georgia (along with Charlayne Hunter); attended Morehouse before transferring to UGA	
Martin Luther King Jr.	1948	prominent leader of the Civil Rights Movement and Nobel Peace Prize Laureate; delivered the historic "I Have a Dream" speech during the March on Washington 1963	
Martin Luther King III	1979	eldest child of Martin Luther King Jr. and human rights activist	
Shaun King	2002	civil rights activist, entrepreneur and senior justice writer for the New York Daily News	
Floyd McKissick	1948	lawyer, civil rights activist, and national director of CORE (Congress of Racial Equality); first African-American admitted to University of North Carolina at Chapel Hill School of Law	
George H. Starke Jr.	1957	first African-American admitted to the University of Florida	
Howard Zehr	1965	grandfather of Restorative Justice; 2006 winner of the Community of Christ Peace Award; first white student to attend Morehouse	

== Sports ==
Name	Class year	Notability	Reference(s)
Donn Clendenon	1956	New York Mets outfielder and 1969 World Series MVP	
Harold Ellis	1992	former NBA player Los Angeles Clippers and Denver Nuggets; named Morehouse athletic director in 2023	
T.B. Ellis	1934	former Jackson State University head football coach (1946-51) and basketball coach (1949-50)	
Caesar "Zip" Gayles	1924	former head football coach and former head basketball coach at Langston University, member of SWAC Hall of Fame and NAIA Basketball Hall of Fame	
Ramon Harewood	2010	OL, Baltimore Ravens 2010–2012	
Issac Keys	2001	2001–2004 NFL LB	
Edwin Moses	1978	Olympic gold medalist	
John David Washington	2006	RB, St. Louis Rams 2006, all-time leading rusher at Morehouse; former RB in the UFL; actor; son of Pauletta Washington and Oscar Award-winning actor Denzel Washington	

== Others ==
Name	Class year	Notability	Reference(s)
Ennis Cosby	1992	son of comedian Bill Cosby	
Wilmer Angier Jennings	1933	printmaker, painter, and jeweler	
Joshua Packwood	2008	first white valedictorian of Morehouse	

== Notable faculty ==
Name	Department	Notability	Reference
Na'im Akbar	Psychology	author, Breaking the Chains and Images of Psychological Slavery	
Amalia Amaki	History	modern and contemporary artist	
Clayborne Carson	History	executive director, Martin Luther King Jr. Collection; professor, Stanford University	
Lawrence Edward Carter	Religion	dean, Martin Luther King Chapel; Fulbright Scholar; founder of the Gandhi, King, Ikeda Community Builders Prize	
Louis Delsarte	Fine Arts	painter, muralist	
Frank Forbes	Athletics	former Morehouse College athletic director and basketball coach; the 6,000 seat on-campus arena, Forbes Arena, is named after him	
E. Franklin Frazier	Sociology	author, Black Bourgeoisie	
Kemper Harreld	Music	established the Morehouse College Glee Club	
John Hope	president	first black president of Morehouse	
John Hopps Jr.	Physics	former director, Charles Stark Draper Laboratory, MIT	
Alton Hornsby Jr.	History	History department chair at Morehouse for 30 years, professor for 42 years, scholar of Black Southern history, and author; also an alumnus of Morehouse	
Edward A. Jones	Foreign Language	author, A Candle in the Dark: A History of Morehouse College	
Benjamin E. Mays	President	mentor to Martin Luther King Jr.; established the institutions international academic reputation and gave rise to the Morehouse Mystique	
Henry Cecil McBay	Chemistry	winner of the Norton Prize in Chemistry, the Norris Award, and the Herty Award for Outstanding Contributions in Chemistry; first MLK Visiting Scholar at MIT	
Charles Wilbert Snow	Political Science	diplomat	
Samuel Woodrow Williams	Philosophy and Religion	Baptist minister, civil rights activist	
