= Clair Huxtable =

Fictional character

- The Cosby Show character
- Clair Huxtable, portrayed by Phylicia Rashad, as she appears in an episode of The Cosby Show.
- First appearance: "Pilot" (September 20, 1984)
- Last appearance: "And So We Commence" (April 30, 1992)
- Created by: Bill Cosby
- Portrayed by: Phylicia Rashad

In-universe information
- Full name: Clair Olivia Hanks Huxtable
- Gender: Female
- Occupation: Lawyer
- Spouse: Cliff Huxtable
- Children: Sondra Huxtable; Denise Huxtable; Theodore Huxtable; Vanessa Huxtable; Rudy Huxtable
- Relatives: Al Hanks (father); Carrie Hanks (mother); Sarah Hanks (sister); Pamela Tucker (cousin); Ellis Wilson (great-uncle); Nelson Tibideaux (grandson); Winnie Tibideaux (granddaughter); Ellington Kendall (grandson)
- Nationality: American

Clair Olivia Hanks Huxtable is a fictional character from the American sitcom The Cosby Show (1984–1992). Portrayed by actress Phylicia Rashad, Clair, the wife of Cliff Huxtable and mother of their five children, is the matriarch of the show's central Huxtable family. Working as a lawyer, Clair values the importance of maintaining a successful career and strong household simultaneously. The character debuted alongside most of her family in the pilot episode, "Theo's Economic Lesson", which premiered on September 20, 1984.

Created by comedian Bill Cosby, Clair is based on Cosby's own wife, Camille. Cosby intended for the character to be a plumber, but the producers and Camille ultimately convinced him to rewrite her into a lawyer to reflect a family that closer resembled their own. At one point, Clair had also been envisioned as a Dominican housewife who speaks Spanish when frustrated, inspired by Ricky Ricardo from the sitcom I Love Lucy, but this idea was also abandoned. Rashad, credited as Phylicia Ayers-Allen, won the role by exhibiting a subtlety in her audition that other candidates lacked. After marrying husband Ahmad Rashad and adopting his surname, Rashad became pregnant with their child during the show's third season, thus requiring her to conceal her pregnancy during episode tapings.

Typically playing straight woman to Cosby's humorous Cliff, Rashad's character began to adopt more comedic material during the show's second season, although she maintains her disciplinarian status within her own household. Since The Cosby Show's inception, Cosby had always intended for Clair to reflect the ways in which women's roles have evolved in both the home and workplace. Clair is depicted as a hardworking career woman with strong feminist principles, most evident in the character's early confrontations with chauvinistic son-in-law Elvin. One particularly memorable interaction, dubbed Clair's "feminist rant" by the media, has become so popular that the scene continues to be heavily circulated on the Internet and social media, 30 years after its initial appearance.

Both Clair's role and Rashad's performance have garnered significant acclaim; Clair was the series' only main character who avoided criticisms that regularly plagued other aspects of The Cosby Show. Rashad was nominated for two Emmy Awards for Outstanding Lead Actress in a Comedy Series. Despite the actress' continued success, Clair remains the role for which Rashad is best known, credited with establishing her as a television icon. Clair is revered as one of television's most beloved mothers; as one of television's first working mothers, the character's profound influence on African-American women and female lawyers in television has been dubbed the "Clair Huxtable effect".

== Role and family ==
Born Clair Olivia Hanks, Clair is a graduate of the fictional Hillman College located in Virginia, the same school attended by her eventual husband Dr. Heathcliff "Cliff" Huxtable. Clair is the matriarch of the upper middle class Huxtable family. A lawyer, Clair is the mother of five children, Sondra, Denise, Theo, Vanessa and Rudy, whom she raises alongside husband Cliff, an obstetrician, in a brownstone in Brooklyn, New York. Clair's home address is 10 Stigwood Avenue, Brooklyn Heights, New York. Episodes typically revolve around Clair and Cliff dealing with everyday situations and problems as they pertain to a standard household during the 1980s. Although both Clair and Cliff counsel, admonish and oftentimes outwit their children together, dividing their parental responsibilities equally, Clair tends to serve as primary disciplinarian to her children – and occasionally to Cliff as well. Of the couple, Clair is typically the parent who offers advice and guidance to her children, in addition to administering suitable punishments for misbehavior.

Clair's family eventually expands to include Sondra's and Denise's love interests, husbands Elvin Tibideaux and Martin Kendall, respectively. Sondra and Elvin eventually have children of their own, twins Winnie and Nelson, named after South African activists Winnie and Nelson Mandela, making Clair a grandmother for the first time. Meanwhile, Martin brings with him Olivia, a young daughter from his previous marriage. Denise's stepdaughter, Olivia ultimately becomes Clair's step-granddaughter. Clair's teenage cousin Pam eventually moves in with her family in the show's seventh season. Also, Clair's in-laws, Russel and Anna Huxtable, make regular appearances throughout the series, as do her own parents Al and Carrie Hanks, albeit to a lesser extent.

Professionally, Clair works as an attorney at the Bradly, Greentree & Dexter law firm in New York City, and eventually makes partner. She mostly works in the areas of mergers and acquisitions, some corporate litigation, as well as a Legal Aid attorney. She occasionally represents her own children in legal disputes, for example helping Theo successfully obtain a refund for several unwearable T-shirts purchased from an untrustworthy salesman. Similarly, Clair defends Sondra when a dishonest mechanic attempts to scam her.

== Development ==
=== Creation and writing ===
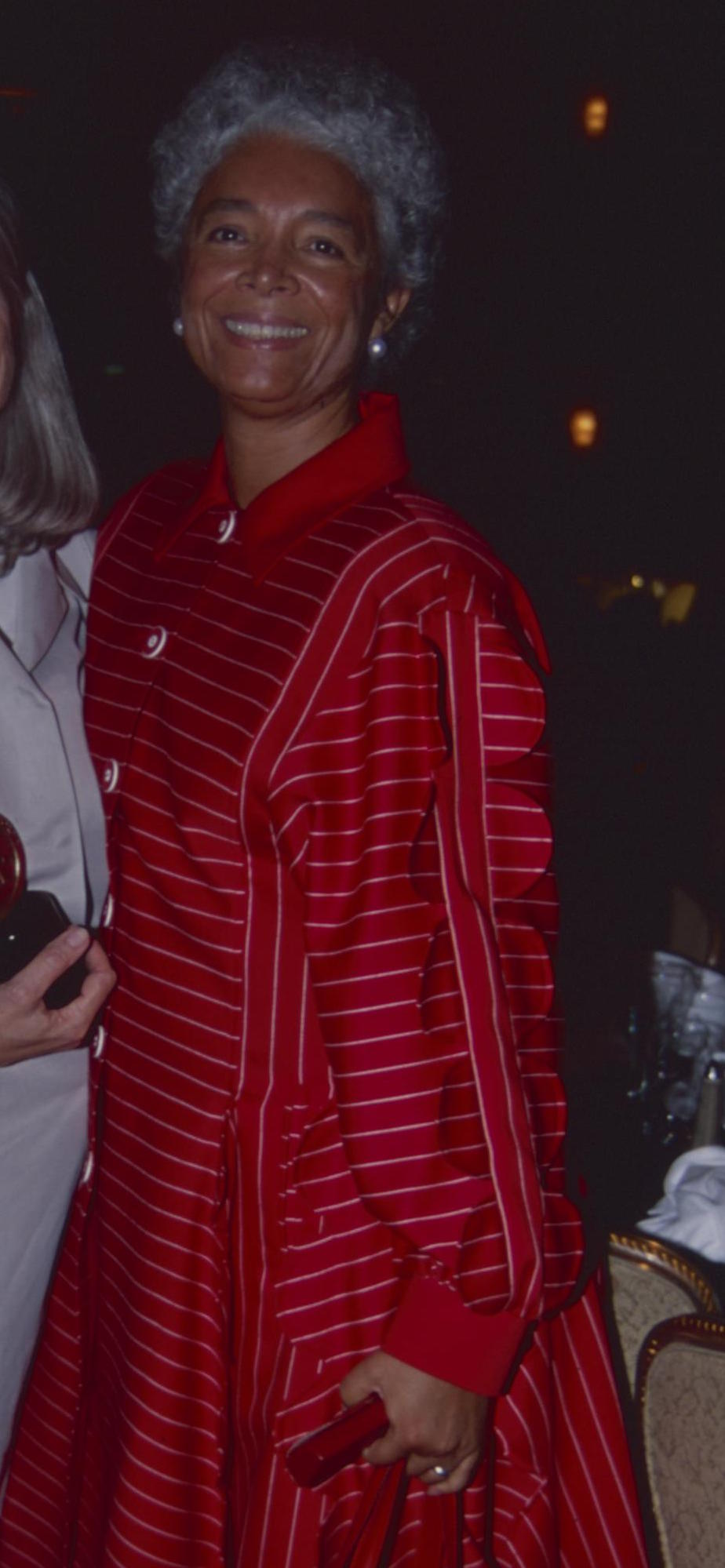
Clair is based on Camille Cosby, Cosby's real-life wife, who convinced Cosby to change Clair's profession from a plumber to a lawyer.

Clair was created for The Cosby Show by comedian Bill Cosby, one of the show's creators. Cosby had pitched a television series about a detective who solves crime using wit and humor; Clair's earliest incarnation resembled his character's girlfriend, who is depicted as "a strong woman with her own career". Networks were not interested in developing the program, prompting Cosby to pursue a more autobiographical idea. Cosby eventually based The Cosby Show on his stand-up comedy film Bill Cosby: Himself (1983), which heavily features jokes about his wife and children. Clair is based on Cosby's own wife, Camille. Although the role of the show's parents evolved dramatically from The Cosby Show's inception to production, the concept of a strong career woman was one of the few ideas retained from Cosby's detective series.

When Cosby first pitched The Cosby Show to NBC, it revolved around a blue-collar couple; Clair was described as a plumber and the character's husband Cliff, played by Cosby himself, was a limousine driver. Eventually, the idea of Clair working as a plumber was discarded and the character was briefly rewritten into a Dominican housewife. Inspired by Ricky Ricardo from the sitcom I Love Lucy, of which Cosby was a fan, much of the show's humor would have been derived from Clair's tendency to revert to her native language, Spanish, when upset or agitated. Describing the concept as "the reverse of [I Love] Lucy", Cosby explained that instead the husband "would be the person that didn’t understand when she spoke Spanish" as opposed to the wife.

Camille and executive producers Marcy Carsey and Tom Werner eventually convinced Cosby that the series should feature a family that resembled their own more closely, specifically headed by a pair of successful parents with white-collar professions. Thus, Cosby rewrote Clair and Cliff into a lawyer and doctor, respectively. Clair's Dominican heritage was abandoned before the pilot was filmed. However, the character still speaks some Spanish in the first episode and continues to speak the language periodically throughout the series, albeit not as frequently as Cosby had envisioned. Cosby borrowed several names from his real-life family for his fictional one; Clair's maiden name is Hanks, which she shares with Camille. The second season explores each character gaining more responsibility, none more-so than Clair, who is deliberately provided with more storylines and emotions to experience in terms of her relationship with her husband and children.

=== Casting and portrayal ===
Clair is portrayed by American actress Phylicia Rashad. In addition to appearances on both television and Broadway, Rashad had a recurring role as Courtney Wright on the soap opera One Life to Live before Cosby personally selected her to play his character's wife. Several actresses auditioned for the role, the majority of whom tended to resort to angrily yelling and gesturing when scolding the child actors auditioning to play the character's children. However, Rashad's subtle interpretation differed from her competition; when the actress screen tested opposite actor Malcolm Jamal-Warner, who would ultimately portray son Theo, Rashad simply paused, stared silently and offered him "a look" instead of immediately scolding the character that, according to Cosby, meant "four or five things ... and none of them were good." At the end of Rashad's audition, Cosby announced to Carsey "[Rashad is] Clair". Additionally, because Clair was still intended to be of Dominican heritage at the time, Rashad's own bilingualism and fluency in Spanish benefited her successful casting. Cosby told Rashad she won the role because she acted "with a knowing look in [her] eye."

Observing similarities between the character and herself, Rashad described Clair as "a warm, loving mother"; the actress is also similar in appearance and personality to Camille. Rashad's acting had always been more straight-faced to counter Cosby's humor, typically playing straight woman to Cosby's antics. In preparation for the second season, Cosby decided to offer Rashad more comedic material upon learning the actress is "capable of handling comedy on her own–without Cliff." Jet's Robert E. Johnson observed that Rashad portrays her character using "soft, sophisticated humor". The sixth season episode "Off to See the Wretched", in which Clair yells at Vanessa for traveling to Baltimore to see a rock concert against her parents' orders, features Rashad's most "uncontrolled" performance as the character. Speaking fondly of his co-star, Cosby said "There's nobody whom I can be more thankful about than Phylicia." In the aftermath of a highly publicized article published in TV Guide before the series premiered that labeled Cosby "one of the most arrogant celebrities", Rashad took over the majority of the show's promotional appearances herself. Rashad also defended Cosby against the accusations, calling him "one of the most intelligent people I have ever known." In addition to being a few years younger than Clair was intended to be, Rashad is only 10 years older than actress Sabrina LeBeauf, who portrays eldest child Sondra. Meanwhile, actress Ethel Ayler, who portrays Clair's mother Carrie, is only 14 years her senior. Actress Clarice Taylor auditioned for the role of Carrie, deliberately making herself over in attempt to look young enough to play Rashad's mother before Cosby ultimately cast her as his own character's.

Credited as Phylicia Ayers-Allen, Rashad eventually adopted the surname of her third husband, sportscaster Ahmad Rashad, whom she married during the show's third season. During the wedding ceremony, Rashad was "given away" to Ahmad by television husband Cosby, by whom the couple had first been introduced. Cosby assured Rashad that she would be allowed to remain on the show should she and Ahmad decide to have a baby, joking, "We'll just add another Huxtable". Rashad became pregnant with their child during season three. To avoid having to add an infant to the main cast, extreme tactics were used to conceal the actress' pregnancy onscreen, such as confining Clair to bed or having her be out of town for several episodes at a time. Scooped out, the bed's mattress was specially constructed to prevent Rashad's growing stomach from being visible underneath the covers but ultimately resulted in the actress suffering a pinched nerve in her back. Rashad would also hide behind props such as kitchen tables, counters and jackets. In the episode "Vanessa's Rich", Rashad uses a large teddy bear to hide her pregnancy while seated on the living room sofa, but the toy's origin and purpose within the episode remains unexplained. After giving birth to daughter Condola Rashad in 1986, Rashad managed to lose the weight she had gained while pregnant by the time season four premiered. Rashad's sister, actress Debbie Allen, appeared in an episode of The Cosby Show as Clair's personal trainer. Additionally, Cosby enlisted Rashad to choreograph the Huxtables' performance of Ray Charles' "Night Time Is the Right Time".

Rashad enjoyed working with both Cosby and the young cast, claiming that the actors very much became like a real family as early as the first episode, although her real-life relationship with the child actors more-so resembled that of friends as opposed to mother. Clair believes that playing a serious mother on television has helped her have more fun in real life, explaining that she realized the bedroom of her own son, Billy, was merely "typical" in comparison to that of Theo's. Rashad said, "I think Bill and I are great role models as far as our TV professions are concerned. Kids learn by example, and I think we're very good ones." Second to Cosby himself, Rashad is the series' most regular cast member, appearing in a total of 212 episodes. In response to television personality Oprah Winfrey quoting a common critique of the series – "How is it realistic to have a doctor and a lawyer in the same house?" – Rashad defended, "I grew up in Houston, Texas, in Third Ward, and it was very realistic. … I guess it just depends on who you know and what you know."

== Characterization and themes ==
=== Personality and parenting style ===
Representing "the exemplary good wife and mother", Clair is depicted as both composed and maternal. Described as "graceful but assertive, dignified but devoted" by Encyclopædia Britannica, Clair is an eloquent, elegant and intelligent character, and appears to be as street as she is book smart. US Weekly said that the character possesses a "sly" sense of humor. A proficient debater who always speaks her mind, she rarely loses arguments. Writing for For Harriet, Tracey Michae'l described the character as "elegantly tough, eloquent, and engaging". Usually depicted as the smartest character in any given room, Clair often uses her skills attained as a lawyer to uncover the truth when other characters, particularly her children, are lying, on one occasion getting Theo to admit (through a family "trial") that he had made cracks about an overweight fast food restaurant employee, which she overheard, resulting in his expulsion from track by the irate coach. Robert E. Johnson of Ebony observed that Clair's legal background "equipped her with rapid, razor-sharp retorts to counter" Cliff's humor. Clair is also shown to be a talented singer – she performs a duet with musician Stevie Wonder in the episode "A Touch of Wonder" – dancer and multilinguist, capable of speaking Spanish and Portuguese in addition to English. Passionate about her African American heritage and culture, Clair wins painter Ellis Wilson's – her "great uncle" in the series – original painting Funeral Procession at an auction, which she purchases for $11,000 and proudly hangs in her living room for the remainder of the series.

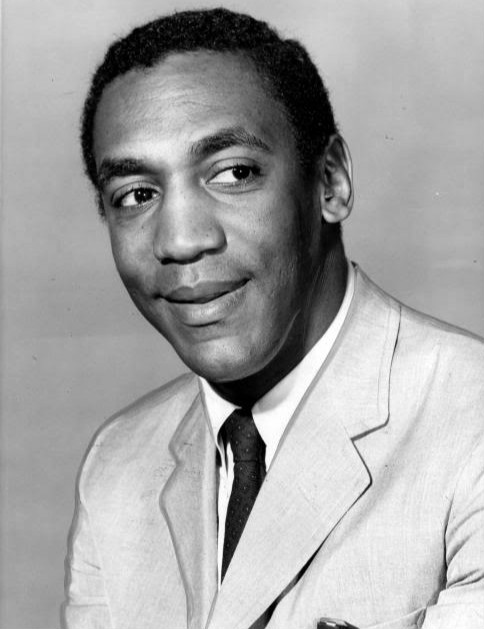
Comedian and creator Bill Cosby plays Dr. Cliff Huxtable, Clair's husband who is marginally less stern than she is as a parent.

New Jersey 101.5 believes "Strong, loving and warm" to be "three of the best ways to describe Clair". MeTV described Clair's parenting style as "firm, yet loving." Writing for NPR, Eric Deggans observed that Clair uses a "loving-yet-sardonic" approach to parenting, demonstrated by her line "I was a beautiful woman once, before the children came". Considered to be the stricter of the two parents, Clair is humorous and sarcastic about the frustrations and challenges of parenting, often joking about killing or abandoning her children but at the same time making sure they do not take her exaggerated threats too seriously by demonstrating "obvious loving indulgences". She prefers to use "a no-nonsense ... approach to maintaining" her family, except for rare situations in which nonsense is required. In the pilot, Clair responds to Theo's last minute breakfast request for scrambled eggs after she had already prepared sunny side up eggs for him by using her spatula to "scramble" them. According to The Mommy Myth: The Idealization of Motherhood and How It Has Undermined All Women author Susan Douglas, Clair sometimes makes the mistake of alternating between stern and overindulgent too abruptly. Equally successful in their respective professions, Clair's relationship with Cliff deliberately mirrors the real-life relationship of Cosby and his wife Camille. Clair occasionally raises her voice but seldom yells or loses her temper, demonstrating calmness and a sense of humor as a "remedy for the trials and tribulations of motherhood."

In comparison to Cliff, Clair is usually the tougher and more sensible parent, offering her children legitimate advice that they can actually apply to their everyday lives; it remains clear to audiences that Clair runs the household. AskMen's Geoffrey Lansdell agreed that the character "rel[ies] on a sly maternal quality that fed off of Bill Cosby’s silly paternal playfulness". However, there are occasionally times when Clair resorts to the "wait till your father gets home" method of disciplining her children. Clair generally accepts her children's decisions and ever-changing ambitions, specifically in regards to schooling, marriage and careers. Both Clair and Cliff value the importance of proper education in their children's lives, appearing proudest when they do well in school, but delivering the most serious punishments when they underperform academically. On one occasion, Theo rebels against his parents' high expectations of him, arguing, "Because of what you two have achieved, the whole world expects a lot more from us than other kids. Let’s face it, there’s nowhere else left for us to go but down," a statement Clair immediately reprimands him for making. When it comes to parenting, Clair usually maintains "an allure of cool, calm confidence ... exhibit[ing] a strong but gentle parenting stance, one that wasn’t seen on television by a woman of color" at the time, according to Global Grind's Desire Thompson. Clair practices disciplining her children without ever punishing them physically, often delivering punishments "with a calm charm", and raises her four daughters to love and respect themselves. However, she is also known for ranting at her children when she loses her temper, one of her most recognizable of which is the one she gives Vanessa when she attends a concert in Baltimore against her parents' wishes. In the Season 3 episode "The Shower", Denise hosts a wedding shower for a close friend who gets pregnant on purpose to blackmail her parents into letting her marry her fiancé as soon as possible. When Denise broaches the subject of how she would handle a similar situation, Clair sternly – but rather comically – insists that she will never find herself in a similar situation. Despite her seriousness and disciplinarian status, Clair seldom shies away from laughing and participating in fun activities alongside her family as opposed to simply observing them from the sidelines. The character is also fond of relaxing and taking time to herself away from her children whenever necessary.

=== Beliefs, feminism and career ===
The Cosby Show is famous for rarely discussing political or controversial topics; it spends significantly more time openly addressing Clair's role as "a woman who 'has it all'", maintaining a successful career while raising a family, than it does the race of its characters. The series seldom shies away from discussing gender equality. Despite never referring to herself as feminist within the show, Clair proudly embodies several feminist themes and beliefs, remaining, according to The Daily Dot's Nico Lang, "an outspoken advocate for equality in her household, fighting sexism while setting an example for her daughters." From the sitcom's earliest stages, Cosby had always intended for Clair to reflect the ever-changing work and family dynamic, explaining, "If this was 1964 ... my wife could do the cooking and I could be the guy on the sofa who just says, ‘Let your mother handle this.’ But today a lot of things have changed and I want the show to reflect those changes." According to Rotten Tomatoes' Alex Vo, Clair represents "the rapidly changing gender and household roles from the 1980s and onward." MeTV agreed that Clair is "the '80s response to the '50s housewife." Although feminism was hardly a new concept to sitcoms by the time The Cosby Show premiered, feminist television characters remained scarce during the early 1980s. The Huffington Post's Dr. Mlsee Harris observed that, during this time, "The stereotypical role of the black woman on television ... had been that of a financially struggling, single woman with dysfunctional relationships, trying to get her life together with no distinct direction", stereotypes Clair worked to defy. Sarah Galo of Mic observed that Clair demonstrates that motherhood and having a career are not "separate entities".

The New York Daily News' Rachel Desantis believes that the character's "'woman who has it all' mentality towards motherhood and her career as an attorney represented the shifting idea of what it meant to be not just an American mother in the 1980s, but a black American mother." According to Vox writer Lauren Williams, the character reinforces "that pursuing such a demanding career and having a family were not mutually exclusive", seldom hesitating to challenge anyone who doubts her ability to maintain both. For example, in the season one episode "How Ugly Is He?", Clair responds to a sexist statement made by Denise's then-boyfriend David about Clair's decision to work as opposed to remaining home to raise the children with "Why don’t you ask Dr. Huxtable that question?" This exchange would serve as a preface to future, more prominent confrontations Clair would have with Sondra's chauvinistic boyfriend Elvin, who is introduced in the following season in the episode "Cliff in Love", during which Elvin wrongly perceives Clair offering him and Cliff a cup of coffee as an act of servitude. Clair promptly corrects Elvin in the form of a rant that explains the equal roles of a married husband and wife; Jason Bailey of Slate compared Clair's speech to Gloria Stivic arguing about feminist politics with her father Archie Bunker in the sitcom All in the Family. However, when Cliff voices his preference for Daryl, a young man competing for Sondra's affection, over Elvin due to the former's more progressive opinions about women, Clair defends Elvin, reminding Cliff that he once shared Elvin's views and ideas before Clair ultimately changed him for the better. Despite their differences, Clair is willing to accept Elvin with confidence that his primitive opinions about women will eventually change, and is never shown to be mistreating him. Bailey concluded, "If The Cosby Show’s racial politics were merely implied, its gender politics were clear, pointed, and decidedly progressive."

Clair's beliefs and endeavors as a working wife and mother are wholeheartedly supported by her family. Additionally, when Clair is at work, Cliff willingly assumes traditionally female household responsibilities such as cooking and cleaning. Both Clair's professional and personal lives operate alongside each other rather smoothly with little conflict. However, despite being a full-time lawyer, she is seldom shown at work in the courtroom; audiences see the character at home more often than anywhere else. According to Women Watching Television: Gender, Class, and Generation in the American Television Experience author Andrea L. Press, Clair's role demonstrates "the hegemonic view that families need not change to accommodate working wives and mothers", believing that the show mostly depicts Clair at home to avoid exploring the everyday conflicts working women endure in their daily lives. One of the series' more political moments, Clair refuses to be exploited as "the token black woman" on a morning talk show discussing the Great Depression during the episode "Mrs. Huxtable Goes to Kindergarten", a position she accepts under the impression that she would be appreciated for her experience as a lawyer. When Clair learns that her all-white male co-panelists only want to hear opinions from the perspective of a black woman, Clair delivers a speech that reads, "I am also a human being, who is an attorney, a mother of five, and somewhat knowledgeable about history ... But when you look at me, this is all you see in me, a black woman?"

== Critical reception ==
The show's only main character to have been spared harsh criticism, Clair has garnered very positive reviews from critics, by whom she continues to be venerated frequently. Critics and journalists often celebrate the character's "outspoken, womanist views". Blake Green of The Baltimore Sun described the character as "the perfect wife and mother of five who also practiced law and dressed to the nines." Jezebel's Hillary Crosley Coker hailed Clair as a "career-driven matriarch that kicked ass at home and at work." Writing for Complex, Nikeita Hoyte described Clair as "A hard-ass mom who radiates the beauty of a goddess", while the Chicago Tribune wrote that "Clair was one big beacon of gorgeous in the Huxtable household." AfterEllen.com's Jill Guccini called Clair "divine". Including her on her list of "Diverse TV Ladies That Can Help Young Girls Learn How to Kick Ass", she hailed her relationship with Cliff as "something that young girls—gay or straight—really need to see", while praising her occasional use of Spanish. In a retrospective review of The Cosby Show in 2014, Daily Life writer Ruby Hamad highlighted Clair as the "one thing about the show that is as good now as it was then". In terms of the character's best episodes, Joe Reid of The Atlantic cited Clair's unimpressed reaction to her husband allegedly confusing a cherished memory of her with that of an old love interest in the sixth season episode "Isn't It Romantic?" as a personal favorite, specifically lauding Rashad's pronunciation of "tacky barrette" and "her hairpin turn when Cliff's real gift is revealed that shows that next dimension that always pushed Clair to the top of the heap." Meanwhile, Kevin O'Keefe, writing for the same publication, selected Clair's enraged monologue to Vanessa in season six's "Off to See the Wretched", followed by the character's dismay upon learning that Sondra has decided not to return to law school, as his favorites, enjoying the way in which Clair adopts an "attack mode" in both circumstances. Reviewing the character's conversation about pregnancy and marriage with Denise in season three's "The Shower", Slate's Aisha Harris wrote "written realistically and delivered beautifully by Rashad, the moment attains a level of artistry that spot-on TV lessons rarely reach." When the show aired, both middle and upper-class working women responded well to Clair. However, some few reviewers have occasionally accused the character of being too perfect and one-dimensional, while others found her to be too aggressive, outspoken, lacking in maternity and overly controlling towards both her children and husband. Additionally, some feminist critics did not appreciate the fact that Clair rarely struggles with everyday situations that working mothers typically encounter in real life.

Rashad has also garnered critical acclaim for her performance. Writing for AARP, Allan Fallow wrote that Rashad charmed audiences "with her wholesome brand of comedy." Robert Weintraub of The New York Times hailed Rashad as "America’s mom, dispensing tough love with a straight face opposite Cosby’s comic mugging". Jason Bailey of Slate wrote that Rashad portrayed her character "majestically", while The Huffington Post's Mlsee Harris praised the actress for playing Clair "with class and poise from 1984 through 1992." Writing for the same publication, Jennifer Armstrong dubbed Rashad "a great ranter". Nick Hartel of DVD Talk reviewed that she "perfectly ... captures some of his best caricatures of [Cosby's] own wife, Camille." However, Time television critic Richard Zoglin criticized the actress for being "too young by a decade". Rashad has won numerous awards and accolades for her performance over the course of two decades, including two Primetime Emmy Award nominations for Outstanding Lead Actress in a Comedy Series. Although she never won, Randee Dawn of Today felt that Rashad's performances during the show's first and last seasons were most deserving. Dawn elaborated, "While it seems hard to imagine today, in 1984, finding a tough-minded, super smart, middle-class black woman on TV was all but unheard of, much less finding one who could contend with and occasionally upstage a legendary comedian." Following her 1986 nomination, Rashad would remain the last African American actress to be nominated for an Emmy Award in that particular category for 30 years, until 2016. At the 15th People's Choice Awards in 1989, Rashad won in the category of Favorite Female TV Performer. Rashad also won two NAACP Image Awards. Former South African President Nelson Mandela once personally thanked Rashad for her contributions to The Cosby Show, which he claimed to have watched while imprisoned on Robben Island.

== Impact and legacy ==
Clair is widely regarded as one of the greatest mothers in television history by several media publications. Time dubbed Clair "America's favorite TV mom". People's Jane Hall hailed the character as America's "No. 1 wife and mom" while crowning Rashad "TV's Reigning Mom" in 1987. Hayley Krischer of Salon agreed that Clair is "everyone’s favorite" and "undoubtedly the best TV mom", despite being "too calm, too gorgeous, too successful" to be realistic. The Daily Beast wrote, "Clair Huxtable was not only the perfect mom, but also a great role model as someone who never sacrificed either her career as a high-power lawyer or her family life." Praising the character for transcending both racial and generational barriers, Patrice Evans of Jezebel described Clair as "the perfect professional mom". The author went on to claim that while other famous television mothers such as June Cleaver, Carol Brady and Edith Bunker have gradually suffered a loss in "potency" over time, Clair instead remains a relevant maternal figure every television mother created since can only aspire to be like. Laura Miller of JetMag.com agreed that Clair has always been "the mother to aspire to. She was Black, she was a professional, had a working husband, and a boat load of children. She had it all", but also acknowledged that her portrayal "isn’t a complete reality either". As a "family-balancing professional African American woman", Clair has had a profound influence on The Cosby Show's viewers. According to Susan Douglas, author of The Mommy Myth: The Idealization of Motherhood and How It Has Undermined All Women, Clair was "the first African American mother on television ... with whom white women identified and wanted to emulate." US Weekly recognized Clair as "one of TV's first working mothers", while NewNowNext's Brian Juergens credits the character with making the 1980s a "boom time for great sitcom moms" by "breaking the mold in an essential way". SheKnows contributor Cynthia Boris recognized Clair as a mother television audiences had "never seen before -- a beautiful, successful, working mom who was an African American" and "a positive role model ... every young woman could aspire to." Sharifa Daniels of Vibe concluded "No other TV mom has left such of an effect on viewers as Clair Huxtable ... an exemplary example of a wife, mother, and friend" in an article recognizing "10 Life Lessons Clair Huxtable Taught You". According to Cetusnews, Clair and Rashad's performance are responsible for "chang[ing] the perception of working mothers" as one of the first working mothers on television. Lisa Respers France of CNN wrote that Clair was "As beloved as Cosby's Dr. Huxtable", describing her as "a strong, Black feminist in a television landscape with few."

Clair was voted "best TV Mom" in a 2004 poll conducted by the Opinion Research Corporation. Access Hollywood selected Clair as the second greatest television mother "Of All Time", praising her pioneering role as a "family-balancing professional". Parents ranked the character third out of their "15 Best TV Moms". Describing her as "the chic '80s mom who taught us we can have it all", Entertainment Weekly included Clair at number four on their "20 TV Moms We Love" ranking; MeTV also ranked the character fourth. According to SheKnows in 2008, Clair is the sixth best television mother of the past 60 years. In 2009, she was included in the Top 5 Classic TV Moms by Film.com. In May 2012, Clair was one of the 12 moms chosen by users of iVillage on their list of "Mommy Dearest: The TV Moms You Love". Unranked, the New York Daily News included Clair among the publication's 10 "coolest small-screen moms". Similarly, New Jersey 101.5 ranked Clair the second "coolest" television mother, identifying "her role as a pioneering, family-balancing professional" as "a positive one in a sea of dysfunctional TV families." Similarly, Paste recognized Clair as one of "The Best TV Moms of the Last 20 Years" in 2009. According to Paste, Clair is the second "Funniest TV Mom"; recognizing her "flawless" insults, author Anita George described her famous rants as "the stuff of comedy legend", explaining, "it’s not just because the words themselves are elegant and witty. No, Phylicia Rashad had this lyrical, rapid-fire delivery, that made anything that came out of Clair’s mouth sound like a particularly saucy Aaron Sorkin-monologue." Hearitfirst.com ranked the character the ninth "Most Respected" television mother of all time. AskMen included Clair among the website's "Top 10: Hot Sitcom Moms", ranking her fourth. The A. V. Club recognized Clair among the greatest fictional mothers of all-time. Ranking the character their favorite fictional mother, The Grio determined that the character "will always be remembered as the working mother that was strong, opinionated, unapologetic and compassionate." The New York Daily News ranked her the eight best working mother on television. Despite her adoration as a mother, Lynn Neary of NPR observed that women dislike the character "because I think I could never be that patient, that fabulous, you know, five kids, holding it down like that."

As in serve your man? Let me tell you something Elvin. You see, I am not serving Dr. Huxtable, okay? That's the kind of thing that goes on in a restaurant. Now I am going to bring him a cup of coffee, just like he brought me a cup of coffee this morning, and that, young man, is what marriage is made of: it is give and take, fifty-fifty. And if you don't get it together, and drop these macho attitudes, you are never going to have anybody bringing you anything, anywhere, anyplace, anytime, ever.

— Clair's famous "feminist rant" to Sondra's boyfriend Elvin about gender roles in marriage as it appears in "Cliff in Love", Season 2, Episode 4.

Clair has since been established as a feminist icon, often hailed by critics "as one of the biggest feminist icons in TV history" who "helped redefine the representation of working women in the media." Vox's Lauren Williams credits the character with teaching "me about feminism before I knew what it was". Writing for Jezebel, Hilary Crosley Coker crowned Clair "a Trojan Horse for" both feminism and black feminism. Dubbing the character "a bonafide feminist warrior", Daily Life Ruby Hamad praised Clair for teaching her "that a woman is no less of a woman, a mother and a wife for working." Slate critic Jason Bailey observed that, during The Cosby Show's initial run, critics and audiences were too busy commenting on the race of the sitcom's main characters to notice that Cosby had imbued his series with "proud and vocal feminism" in the form of Clair. According to Bailey, The Cosby Show was not only successful because Clair "was a strong, liberated woman with a career"; she also "had a husband and family who supported and valued her endeavors." Dubbing Clair's influence on pop culture as "one of TV’s great feminists" the "Other Huxtable Effect", Bailey concluded that the character's impact remains indisputable despite Cosby's recent sexual assault allegations, and thus maintains that The Cosby Show's legacy as a feminist series should not be discredited.

Conversely, in recent times Cosby's controversial history with women has caused some contemporary critics to question his intentions behind creating a character like Clair in the wake of a series of sexual assault allegations made against the comedian. In 2014, The Crunk Feminist Collective famously published an article entitled "Clair Huxtable is Dead: On Slaying the Cosbys" in which the author dismissed the character's progressive gender politics as "a sham", arguing that Clair must be forgotten to allow for a new generation of television heroines. Nico Lang of The Daily Dot defended the character against such critics, writing that the show's legacy remains significant "to the Clair Huxtables of the world, both the real women she inspired and a generation of characters who owe a debt to her." Writing for Paste, in 2014 Shannon M. Houston maintains that Clair remains beloved as a "feminist hero" by the same people who now try to disassociate themselves from both Cosby and The Cosby Show. Kirthana Ramisetti of the New York Daily News agreed that Cosby "can’t detract from Clair’s enduring legacy." John Teti, contributing to The A. V. Club, agreed that "Clair Huxtable’s legacy remains intact" despite "the snowballing disgrace of its star has made The Cosby Show less of a wholesome memory than it once was". Rachel Desantis of the New York Daily News concluded, "No matter the off-screen drama surrounding her on-screen husband, Clair remains a vital slice of pop culture history". However, when Rashad defended Cosby and the show's legacy against the allegations made against him by encouraging critics to "forget these women", Thought Catalog's Cassandra Guerrier wrote that the actress' comments reminded fans that "Rashad is NOT her character." In 2023, Entertainment Weekly's Lester Fabian Brathwaite said the character's reputation "has remained almost unimpeachable", despite Cosby's crimes.

Mic organized a list of "5 Reasons Claire Huxatable (sic) is the Ultimate Feminist Mom", and The Huffington Post crowned The Cosby Show "One of the Most Feminist Shows of All Time" due to individual contributions from both Clair and Cliff. Dubbed the "feminist rant" by media publications, Clair's speech to future son-in-law Elvin about gender roles and equality in marriage in the episode "Cliff in Love" is often lauded as one of the character's greatest moments, to which the studio audience responded with enthusiastic applause. CNN ranked the rant their seventh favorite The Cosby Show moment. Slate's Jason Bailey hailed the scene as "Rashad’s finest moment on the show." The rant has proven so popular that it continues to be frequently quoted and referenced on the Internet and social media. Paste's Shannon M. Houston believes that "If you’re a woman, and you work, and you identify as a feminist, there’s a 90 percent chance you or someone you know has posted that clip". Additionally, Houston believes that the scene remains so popular because the discussion about women in the workplace has hardly changed since the episode first aired 30 years ago. According to Nico Lang of The Daily Dot, Clair taught an entire generation "what a strong, successful woman looked like". Former United States First Lady Michelle Obama has constantly been compared to Clair, by which Obama admitted she is flattered because she considers the character to be an "American icon". Patrice Evans of Jezebel wrote that although "Michelle Obama might be taking the baton as the quintessential symbol of the professional black woman/doting mother ... she'll still need Barack to win a second term before she can approach the status of Clair Huxtable." However, Rashad herself has discredited the Clair-Obama comparisons. LGBT rights activist Janet Mock cites Clair as one of her biggest influences: "I wanted to be her; I wanted to be beautiful, be successful, and maybe have a great family and a brownstone in Brooklyn."

Several critics have acknowledged Clair's influence on female African American lawyers Olivia Pope and Annalise Keating from the television dramas Scandal and How to Get Away with Murder, respectively. Clair's influence on fictional female lawyers in television, particularly Alicia Florrick's dual role as mother and lawyer in the legal drama The Good Wife, has been dubbed "the Clair Huxtable effect" by the media. Much like Clair, Alicia is often forced to defend her decision to work while raising her family. Paste's Shannon M. Houston concluded, "because someone like Clair Huxtable shared her feminism in the home, someone like Alicia Florrick can now share it in the courtrooms". Crediting Clair with pioneering "the feminist, TV lawyer", the character's impact extends to include Diane Lockhart from The Good Wife and Abby Whelan from Scandal. Rainbow Johnson from the sitcom Black-ish is often compared to Clair. In 2015, Elle dubbed Rainbow "the next Clair Huxtable"; the character often asks herself "What would Clair Huxtable do?" when struggling to parent her own children. Conversely, in 2014 Dr. Mlsee Harris of The Huffington Post published an article asking "Where Is This Generation’s Clair Huxtable?", believing that characters like Clair continue to be scarce in modern-day television despite the character's success and popularity; The Daily Dot's Nico Lang agreed that it is television's responsibility to "create 100 more women like [Clair], ones that won’t have to answer for their creator's sins."

Rotten Tomatoes placed Clair at number 15 on the website's ranking of their "25 Favorite TV Lawyers". TCNJ Journal ranked Clair first on its list of "5 Feminist TV Characters — Old and New — You Should Be Watching". For Harriet touted Clair "undoubtedly one of the most influential Black women characters in television history"; the same website placed the character at number five on its ranking of "The 18 Best Black Female TV Characters of All Time". Similarly, Global Grind ranked Clair first on their collection of "The Top 20 Most Influential African-American Women Television Has Ever Seen" for contributing to the overall success of The Cosby Show. AOL named Clair the ninth "Most Memorable Female TV Character". TVLine ranked Clair among "20 Trailblazing Female TV Characters". In 2019, Rotten Tomatoes recognized Clair among television's 50 most fearless female characters, praising her for "represent[ing] a black middle-class too often overlooked in early television, entering the living rooms of people of every race as a model of both motherhood and career woman." Additionally, Clair is regarded as a fashion icon.

Having portrayed the character for eight years, Rashad remains best known for her role as Clair; the actress established herself as a both household name and television icon during the 1980s for portraying "the working mom who had it all". In 1993, Blake Green of The Baltimore Sun wrote that Rashad and her character "appear to be inextricably entwined: Just as no one remembers Clair, the super-woman of The Cosby Show without thinking of the actress who played her, few think of Ms. Rashad without flashing on Clair". At the 42nd NAACP Image Awards in 2010, the organization dubbed Rashad "mother" of the African-American community. Rashad and Cosby's professional relationship continued beyond The Cosby Show. After The Cosby Show's conclusion, Rashad would similarly portray Cosby's wife, Ruth Lucas, on his sitcom Cosby for four years. Cosby would again recruit Rashad to voice Little Bill Glover's mother, Brenda Glover, in Cosby's animated series Little Bill. In 2016, Esquire included Rashad on their list of "75 Greatest Women of All Time" for portraying "the perfect mother".
