= ACS Award for Encouraging Disadvantaged Students into Careers in the Chemical Sciences =

American award in chemistry education

The Award for Encouraging Disadvantaged Students into Careers in the Chemical Sciences (now known as the ACS Award for Encouraging Underrepresented and Economically Disadvantaged Students into Careers in the Chemical Sciences) is an American Chemical Society (ACS) award sponsored by The Camille and Henry Dreyfus Foundation, it was instituted in 1993 with the intention of recognizing "significant accomplishments by individuals in stimulating students, underrepresented in the profession, to elect careers in the chemical sciences and engineering." It is awarded by the American Chemical Society as part of their national awards program. Recipients receive $5,000, a certificate, up to $1,500 for travel expenses, and a grant of $10,000 to their designee of choice. The first recipient was Henry C. McBay.

== Recipients ==
2026	Angel Martí	Rice University
2025	Karen Lozano	Rice University
2024	Scott T. Wills	Dow
2023	Ann C. Kimble-Hill	Indiana University
2022	Kimberly M. Jackson	Spelman College
2021	Elaine S. Yamaguchi	Retired chemist, Chevron
2020	Lawrence K. Duffy	University of Alaska Fairbanks
2019	Edward C. Alexander	San Diego Mesa College
2018	Jani C. Ingram	Northern Arizona University
2017	Saundra Y. McGuire	Louisiana State University
2016	Luis A. Colón	University of Buffalo
2015	Catherine H. Middlecamp	University of Wisconsin - Madison
2014	Rigoberto Hernandez	Georgia Institute of Technology
2013	George H. Fisher	Barry University
2012	Todd Pagano	Rochester Institute of Technology
2011	Wilfredo Colón	Rensselaer Polytechnic Institute
2010	Robert L. Lichter	Merrimack Consultants
2009	Shirley McBay	Quality Education for Minorities (QEM) Network
2008	Susan V. Olesik	Ohio State University
2007	Robyn E. Hannigan	
2006	Susan R. Fahrenholtz	
2005	Jeannette E. Brown	Merck, NJIT, Retired
2004	Zaida Morales-Martínez	Florida International University
2003	Isiah M. Warner	Louisiana State University
2002	James P. Shoffner	
2001	Carlos G. Gutierrez	
2000	Slayton A. Evans, Jr.	University of North Carolina, Chapel Hill
1999	Ajay K. Bose	
1998	Zafra Lerman	Columbia College
1997	Billy Joe Evans	
1996	Samuel P. Massie	
1995	Henry C. McBay	Atlanta University System

== See also ==
- List of chemistry awards
