= Zaida =

Zaida may refer to:

- Zaida, Khyber Pakhtunkhwa, a town in northern Pakistan
- Zaida, Morocco, a town in central Morocco
- Zaida of Seville, an 11th-century exile Muslim princess who was the mistress of King Alfonso VI of Castile
- Zaida, a Yiddish informal title for "grandfather"
- Zaida Morales-Martínez, a Puerto Rican chemist
