= Shirley McBay =

American mathematician (1935–2021)

- Born: May 4, 1935
- Died: November 27, 2021

Shirley Ann Mathis McBay (May 4, 1935 – November 27, 2021) was an American mathematician who was the founder and president of the Quality Education for Minorities (QEM) Network, a nonprofit dedicated to improving minority education. She was the dean for student affairs at the Massachusetts Institute of Technology (MIT) from 1980 to 1990. She was the first African American to receive a Ph.D. from the University of Georgia (UGA) (1966, mathematics). McBay was also the first woman of any race to receive a Ph.D. in mathematics from UGA. McBay was recognized by Mathematically Gifted & Black as a Black History Month 2017 Honoree.

== Early life and education ==
Shirley Ann Mathis was born in Bainbridge, Georgia, on May 4, 1935. She received a B.A. in chemistry from Paine College in 1954, graduating summa cum laude. While also teaching chemistry at Spelman College, McBay earned an M.S. in chemistry (1957) and M.S. in mathematics (1958) from Atlanta University. In 1964, she earned a United Negro College Fund Fellowship, sponsored by the IBM Corporation, that allowed her to study at the University of Georgia and earn a Ph.D. in mathematics in 1966. Her Ph.D. was advised by Thomas Roy Brahana with a dissertation on The Homology Theory of Metabelian Lie Algebras.

== Career ==
McBay spent 15 years at Spelman College as a faculty member and administrator. McBay's leadership at Spelman led to the creation of the division of natural sciences and an increase in an emphasis on the sciences at the institution. She served as chairman of the division until 1975 and as associate academic dean at Spelman from 1973 to 1975. During this time, she created pre-freshman summer programs to increase interest in science majors, which led to the creation of a chemistry department and the renovations of existing science buildings.

She left Spelman in 1975 and took a position at the National Science Foundation for five years. While at the National Science Foundation, she became program director of the Minority Institutions Science Improvement Program. She then worked for ten years at MIT as the dean for student affairs. Thirty months of this time included being the director of the QEM Project, a study of minority education problems. The QEM Project was the impetus for the Quality Education for Minorities (QEM) Network that McBay founded and was president of from 1990 to 2016.

In December 2021, the University of Georgia's Science Library was renamed the Shirley Mathis McBay Science Library in her honor.

== Personal life and death ==
Her husband, chemistry professor Henry C. McBay, died in 1995. The couple had married in 1954. McBay died from complications of diabetes on November 27, 2021, in Los Angeles, at the age of 86.
