= List of American Chemical Society national awards =

The List of American Chemical Society national awards attempts to include national awards, medals and prized offered by the American Chemical Society (ACS). The ACS national awards program began in 1922 with the establishment of the Priestley Medal, the highest award offered by the ACS. As of 2016, the ACS offers a 64 national awards, medals and prizes based on scientific and professional contributions in chemistry. A category of ACS awards is available on Wikipedia. The complete list of current awards is:

- ACS Award for Achievement in Research for the Teaching and Learning of Chemistry
- ACS Award for Affordable Green Chemistry
- ACS Award for Computers in Chemical and Pharmaceutical Research
- ACS Award for Creative Advances in Environmental Science and Technology
- ACS Award for Creative Invention
- ACS Award for Creative Work in Fluorine Chemistry
- ACS Award for Creative Work in Synthetic Organic Chemistry
- ACS Award for Distinguished Service in the Advancement of Inorganic Chemistry
- ACS Award for Encouraging Disadvantaged Students into Careers in the Chemical Sciences
- ACS Award for Encouraging Women into Careers in the Chemical Sciences
- ACS Award for Research at an Undergraduate Institution
- ACS Award for Team Innovation
- ACS Award in Analytical Chemistry
- ACS Award in Applied Polymer Science
- ACS Award in Chromatography
- ACS Award in Colloid Chemistry
- ACS Award in Industrial Chemistry
- ACS Award in Inorganic Chemistry
- ACS Award in Organometallic Chemistry
- ACS Award in Polymer Chemistry
- ACS Award in Pure Chemistry
- ACS Award in Separations Science and Technology
- ACS Award in Surface Chemistry
- ACS Award in the Chemistry of Materials
- ACS Award in Theoretical Chemistry
- Award for Volunteer Service to the American Chemical Society
- Roger Adams Award in Organic Chemistry
- Alfred Bader Award in Bioinorganic or Bioorganic Chemistry
- Earle B. Barnes Award for Leadership in Chemical Research Management
- Ronald Breslow Award for Achievement in Biomimetric Chemistry
- Herbert C. Brown Award for Creative Research in Synthetic Methods
- Alfred Burger Award in Medicinal Chemistry
- James Bryant Conant Award in High School Chemistry Teaching
- Arthur C. Cope Award
- Arthur C. Cope Scholar Awards (given for three distinct career levels)
- Elias J. Corey Award for Outstanding Original Contribution in Organic Synthesis by a Young Investigator
- F. Albert Cotton Award in Synthetic Inorganic Chemistry
- Peter Debye Award in Physical Chemistry
- Frank H. Field and Joe L. Franklin Award for Outstanding Achievement in Mass Spectrometry
- Francis P. Garvin - John M. Olin Medal
- James T. Grady - James H. Stack Award for Interpreting Chemistry for the Public
- Harry Gray Award for Creative Work in Inorganic Chemistry by a Young Investigator
- Ernest Guenther Award in the Chemistry of Natural Products
- Katheryn C. Hach Award for Entrepreneurial Success
- E. B. Hershberg Award for Important Discoveries in Medicinally Active Substances
- Joel Henry Hildebrand Award in the Theoretical and Experimental Chemistry of Liquids
- Ralph F. Hirschmann Award in Peptide Chemistry
- Ipatieff Prize
- Frederic Stanley Kipping Award in Silicon Chemistry
- Irving Langmuir Award in Chemical Physics (awarded in even-numbered years by ACS and in odd-numbered years by the American Physical Society)
- Josef Michl ACS Award in Photochemistry
- E. V. Murphree Award in Industrial and Engineering Chemistry
- Nakanishi Prize (awarded in odd-numbered years by ACS and in even-numbered years by the Chemical Society of Japan)
- Nobel Laureate Signature Award for Graduate Education in Chemistry
- James Flack Norris Award in Physical Organic Chemistry
- George A. Olah Award in Hydrocarbon or Petroleum Chemistry
- Charles Lathrop Parsons Award
- George C. Pimentel Award in Chemical Education
- Priestley Medal
- Glenn T. Seaborg Award for Nuclear Chemistry
- Gabor A. Somorjai Award for Creative Research in Catalysis
- George and Christine Sosnovsky Award for Cancer Research
- E. Bright Wilson Award in Spectroscopy
- Ahmed Zewail Award in Ultrafast Science and Technology
