= George Haley =

American academic

George T. Haley is an American author and academic, currently a tenured professor of industrial and international marketing at the University of New Haven in the US state of Connecticut. He is also the director of the Center for International Industry Competitiveness. His research covers industrial marketing, emerging markets, new product development, innovation and B2B marketing. He has testified about his research on China before the United States Congress and several government agencies. The American Marketing Association's Marketing News named him as one of six marketing academics to watch based on his research, teaching and broader impact. He was also named an American Made Hero for his work on the ramifications of trade for US manufacturing in a global economy.

== Early life ==
Haley was born in San Antonio, Texas, where he attended the San Antonio Academy and the Texas Military Institute. Subsequently, he attended the University of Texas at Austin where he received undergraduate degrees in business and psychology and a PhD in marketing administration.

== Research focus ==
Haley has over 100 books, book chapters, articles, research reports and presentations on Asian business and emerging markets, new product development and innovation and industrial marketing. Haley's book New Asian Emperors: The Overseas Chinese, Their Strategies and Competitive Advantages highlighted the informational black hole of Southeast Asia which impeded effective strategic decision making and the power of the overseas Chinese networks. Among the awards that Haley has received, his book New Asian Emperors was called "an important study" by The Economist. His book The Chinese Tao of Business: The Logic of Successful Business Strategy was listed by The Wall Street Journal as the only book on Asian business to read.

== Policy analysis ==
Haley has served as policy analyst for several governments and agencies such as the National Intelligence Council, the United States International Trade Commission and the Connecticut State Department of Economic and Community Development. He provided expert testimony on March 24, 2009, and May 25, 2007, before the congressionally mandated US-China Economic and Security Review Commission on effects of China's pillar industries and key government agencies on global manufacturing and business environments. He currently serves on two corporate and governmental boards.

== Appearances in the media ==
Haley's research on emerging and industrial markets, innovation, and public policy has been profiled several times in the media including as a thought leader for IndustryWeek, and in The Economist, the Financial Times, Time, USA Today, Forbes, Fortune, The Wall Street Journal, Los Angeles Times, CNN, Lou Dobbs Tonight, Voice of America, Marketing News, Selling Power, Far Eastern Economic Review, IndustryWeek, Investor's Business Daily, Inc., BusinessWeek, Chief Executive, CMO, Entrepreneur, EE Times, China Business Weekly, Shanghai Business Review and China Daily.

== Academic career ==
He has taught at several universities, including the Monterrey Institute of Technology and Higher Education, National University of Singapore, Queensland University of Technology (Brisbane, Australia), Thammasat University (Bangkok, Thailand), Fordham University (New York City) and Harvard University (Cambridge, Massachusetts).

== Publications ==
- "Stop Smithfield Purchase by Shuanghui: Opposing View", USA Today, June 5, 2013.
- "How Chinese Subsidies changed the World", Harvard Business Review, April 25, 2013.
- Subsidies to Chinese Industry: State Capitalism, Business Strategy and Trade Policy, Oxford University Press, 2013, ISBN 978-0199773749.
- New Asian Emperors: The Business Strategies of the Overseas Chinese, John Wiley & Sons, 2009, ISBN 978-0470823347.
- Marketing Planning and Strategy 8th edition, Cengage, 2009.
- New Asian Emperors: The Overseas Chinese, their Strategies and Competitive Advantages, Butterworth-Heineman, 1998, ISBN 978-0750641302
- The Chinese Tao of Business: The Logic of Successful Business Strategy, John Wiley & Sons, 2004, 2006, ISBN 978-0470820599
- "Subsidies and the China Price", Harvard Business Review, June 2008.
