= Henry Cecil McBay =

American scientist (1914–1995)

Henry C. McBay
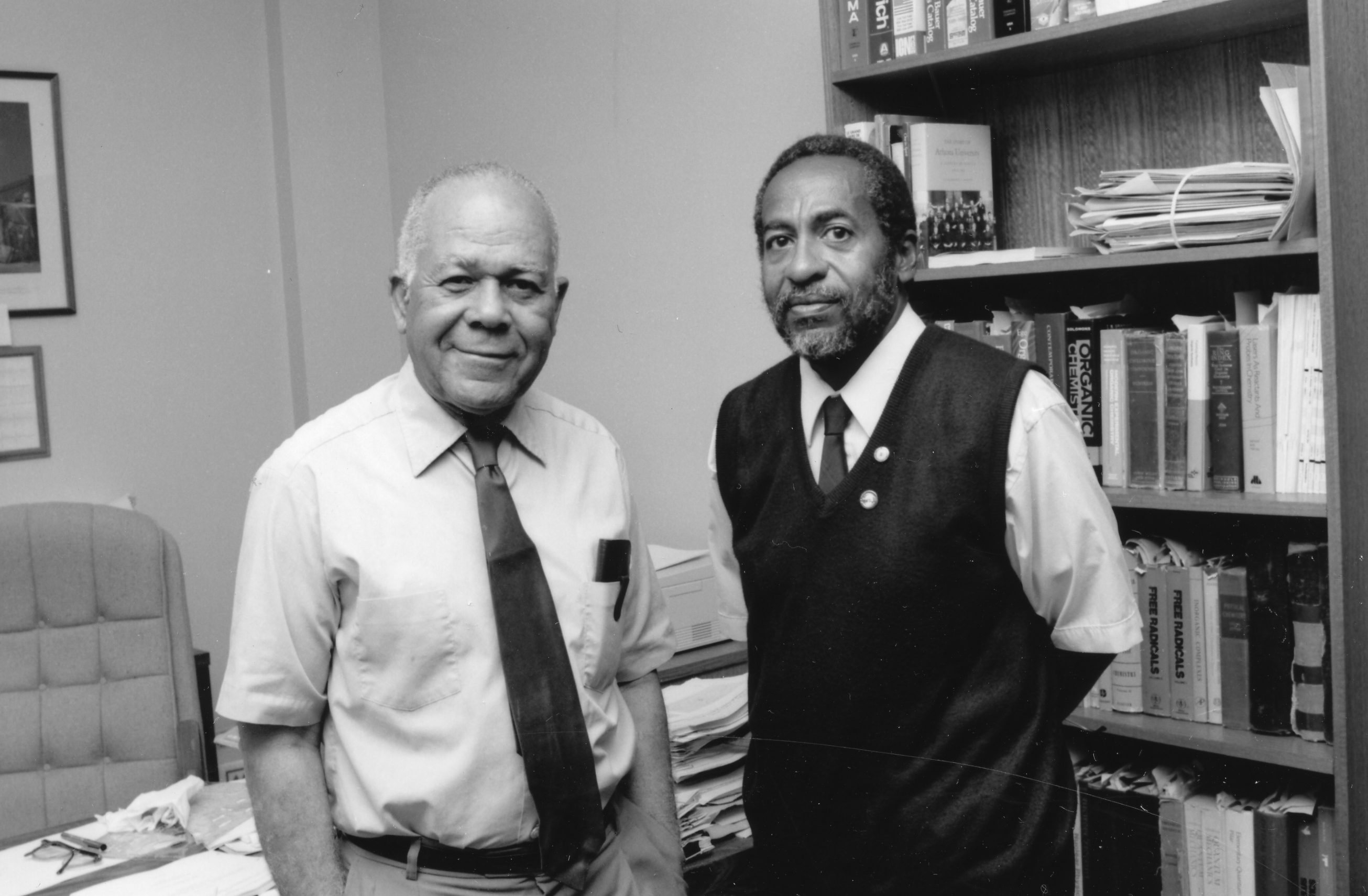
- McBay, left, and physicist Ronald E. Mickens
- Born: May 29, 1914; Mexia, Texas, United States
- Died: 1995 (aged 80–81)
- Education: Wiley College, University of Chicago
- Spouse: Shirley Ann Mathis (m. 1954)
- Scientific career
- Workplaces: University of Atlanta, Morehouse College, Spelman College
- Thesis: "Reactions of Atoms and Free Radicals in Solution"
- Doctoral advisor: Morris S. Kharasch

Henry Ransom Cecil McBay (May 29, 1914 – 1995) was an American chemist and teacher. McBay won numerous awards for his teaching and mentoring, including the American Chemical Society Award (for Encouraging Disadvantaged Students into Careers in the Chemical Sciences). McBay also co-founded the National Organization for the Professional Advancement of Black Chemists and Chemical Engineers (NOBCChE).

== Family ==
Henry Ransom McBay was born on May 29, 1914, in Mexia, Texas. In 1954, McBay married Shirley Ann Mathis, a mathematician and strong advocate for increasing representations of minority students and researchers in academia.

== Education and academic career ==
McBay enrolled at Wiley College in Marshall, Texas, and paid for his education with scholarships and by working jobs during college. He earned a B.S. degree in 1934. After earning his master's degree in 1936 from Atlanta University, McBay returned to Wiley College so he could help his younger brother and sister pay for college.

In 1940 McBay joined a newly formed research team at Tuskegee Institute in Alabama assigned the task of finding a suitable substitute for jute fiber. Indian shipments of jute, which was used for rope and fabrics for sacks, had ended due to World War II. The Tuskegee team hoped to prove that okra stems would be an effective substitute, but McBay proved that by the time an okra plant had matured, the stems were too brittle. Okra could be harvested for food or for fiber, but not for both.

In 1942 McBay accepted a teaching assistant's position at the University of Chicago and resumed his doctoral studies. This move also kept him out of the U.S. military. In 1944, McBay chose Professor Morris Kharasch as his research advisor. He began to learn very specialized techniques in creating and handling highly explosive compounds that offered great value as chemical building blocks. His dissertation focused on developing new methods of producing compounds from acetyl peroxide and in 1945 he received his doctoral degree from the University of Chicago. His doctoral research was later applied to developing a treatment for prostate cancer.

McBay then returned to Atlanta as an assistant professor at Morehouse College in Atlanta. In 1956, he was appointed chairman of the chemistry department. In 1982 McBay became the Fuller E. Callaway Professor of Chemistry at Atlanta University. McBay would eventually teach for 41 years in the Atlanta University system (Morehouse, Spelman, and Atlanta). In 1990, McBay was appointed as the first Martin Luther King Jr. visiting scholar at the Massachusetts Institute of Technology. He taught part-time until his death in 1995.

== Teaching ==
One of McBay's main goals was to pass along his love for chemistry to his students. He regularly demonstrated how two materials could be combined to produce something with completely different properties. One of his frequent demonstrations combined a metallic poison, sodium, with a gaseous poison, chlorine, to produce table salt. He wanted his students to share his fascination with such processes, which he believed to be minor miracles. He mentored dozens of students from historically black colleges and universities who ultimately earned doctoral degrees.

In 1951, he developed a chemistry education program in Liberia on behalf of the United Nations Education, Scientific, and Cultural Organization (UNESCO).

== Honors and awards ==
- Norton Prize (for Excellence at Research in Chemistry) at University of Chicago, in 1944.
- Norton Prize (for Excellence at Research in Chemistry) at University of Chicago, in 1945.
- -- "E.A.Jones (Edward A. Jones)/H.C.McBay/E.B.Williams Award (for Excellence in Teaching)" established at Morehouse College, in 1973.
- Outstanding Teacher, named by the National Association for Black Chemists and Chemical Engineers, in 1976.
- The Herty Award (for Outstanding Contributions to Chemistry) from the American Chemical Society of Georgia, in 1976.
- The Norris Award (for Outstanding Achievement in the Teaching of Chemistry) from the American Chemical Society of the Northeast, in 1978.
- The Kimuel Huggins Award (for Outstanding Contributions of Chemistry, Human Endeavors) from Bishop College, in 1980.
- E. A.Jones (Edward A. Jones)/H.C.McBay/E.B. Williams Award (for Excellence in Teaching) from Morehouse College, in 1981.
- -- "Henry McBay Endowed Chemistry Scholarship" (for students) established at Morehouse College, in 1986.
- Honorary Doctor of Science, from Atlanta University, in 1987.
- -- "Nabrit-Mapp-McBay" Science Building dedicated at Morehouse College, in 1989.
- Martin Luther King Jr. Visiting Scholar, appointed at the Massachusetts Institute of Technology, 1990–1991.
- American Scholar Award, from Delta chapter of Georgia of Phi Beta Kappa, in 1991.
- "Superstar of Science" named, among others, by EBONY magazine, in 1991.
- Honorary Doctor of Science, granted by Atlanta's Emory University, in 1992.
- Honorary Doctor of Science, granted by Bowie State University, in 1993.
- American Chemical Society Award (for Encouraging Disadvantaged Students into Careers in the Chemical Sciences), in 1995.
- -- "Henry C. McBay Research Fellowships" (for faculty members) established by the United Negro College Fund, in 1995.
- -- "Henry C.R. McBay Chair in Space Sciences" established (posthumously) jointly by Morehouse College and Clark Atlanta University, in 1996.
- Honorary Doctor of Science, granted (posthumously) by Morehouse College, in 1996.
- Patent (for Fire Extinguishing Capsule), issued (posthumously), in 1997.
- Patent (for Device For The Synthesis Of Dimeric Species), issued (posthumously), in 1999.
