= Dustin T. Duncan =

American public health researcher

Dustin Troy Duncan
- Education: Morehouse College (BA); Harvard T.H. Chan School of Public Health
- Scientific career
- Fields: Public health
- Workplaces: Columbia University; Harvard T.H. Chan School of Public Health
- Thesis: A spatial analysis of obesogenic neighborhood environmental influences among children and adolescents (2011)

Dustin Troy Duncan is an American public health researcher who is an Associate Dean for Health Equity Research at Columbia University Mailman School of Public Health. Their research considers how environmental factors influence population health and health disparities. In particular, Duncan has focused on the health of sexual minority men and transgender women of color in New York City and the Deep South. Duncan serves as Founder of the Dustin Duncan Research Foundation.

== Early life and education ==
Duncan earned their bachelor's degree at Morehouse College. At Morehouse, Duncan majored in psychology. They moved to the Harvard T.H. Chan School of Public Health for their graduate studies, completing a master's degree in public health science. Based at the Dana–Farber Cancer Institute Center for Community-Based Research, Duncan investigated how public perception of safety influenced people's likelihood to walk in urban neighbourhoods. In particular, this appeared to impact ethnic minority and low income adults. Duncan remained at the Harvard T.H. Chan School of Public Health, where they studied environmental influences that cause obesity amongst young people. After earning his doctorate in 2011, Duncan was appointed the Alonzo Smythe Yerby Postdoctoral Fellow at Harvard.

== Research and career ==
Duncan's research considers how environmental factors influence population health and health disparities. He moved to New York University. In particular, Duncan has focused on the health of sexual minority men and transgender women of color in New York City, Chicago and the Deep South. He is interested in the epidemiology of HIV, sleep and coronavirus diseases. Duncan makes use of Global Positioning System (GPS) technology to better understand neighbourhoods, and they have argued that GPS-defined neighbourhoods are better than ZIP codes for researching communities.

Duncan serves as Associate Dean for Health Equity Research at Columbia University Mailman School of Public Health. Here they lead two cohort studies; N2 (Neighborhoods and Networks), which considers Black, sexual minority men in Chicago and Baton Rouge and TURNNT (Trying to Understand Relationships, Networks and Neighborhoods amongst transgender women of color), which considers HIV-negative transgender women in New York City.

== Awards and honors ==
- 2019 Elected to the Board of Interdisciplinary Association for Population Health Science
- 2019 Harvard University T.H. Chan School of Public Health Emerging Award
- 2020 Columbia University Irving Medical Center Mentor of the Year Award

== Selected publications ==
- Krebs, Paul; Duncan, Dustin (2015). "Health App Use Among US Mobile Phone Owners: A National Survey". JMIR mHealth and uHealth. 3 (4): e101. doi:10.2196/mhealth.4924. PMC 4704953. PMID 26537656. Wikidata Q36441097.
- Duncan, Dustin; Jared Aldstadt; John Whalen; Steven J. Melly; Gortmaker, Steven (2011). "Validation of walk score for estimating neighborhood walkability: an analysis of four US metropolitan areas". International Journal of Environmental Research and Public Health. 8 (11): 4160–4179. doi:10.3390/ijerph8114160. PMC 3228564. PMID 22163200. Wikidata Q35586156.
- Duncan, Dustin; Wolin, Kathleen; Melissa Scharoun-Lee; Ding, Eric; Erica T Warner; Gary G Bennett (2011). "Does perception equal reality? Weight misperception in relation to weight-related attitudes and behaviors among overweight and obese US adults". International Journal of Behavioral Nutrition and Physical Activity. 8: 20. doi:10.1186/1479-5868-8-20. PMC 3073863. PMID 21426567. Wikidata Q34778347.

=== Books ===
- Neighborhoods and health. Dustin T. Duncan, Ichirō Kawachi (2nd ed.). New York, NY. 2018. ISBN 978-0-19-084351-9. OCLC 1030032255.
- The social epidemiology of sleep. Dustin T. Duncan, Ichirō Kawachi, Susan Redline. New York, NY. 2019. ISBN 978-0-19-093044-8. OCLC 1112142040.
- The Social Epidemiology of the COVID-19 Pandemic. Dustin T. Duncan; Ichiro Kawachi; Stephen S. Morse; Sir Michael Marmot. Oxford University Press, Incorporated. 2024. ISBN 978-0-19-762522-4.
