= Angel A. Martí =

Chemist

- Born: Utuado, Puerto Rico
- Occupations: Nanoscience and biophysical inorganic chemist and academic

Academic background
- Education: BS., Chemistry; PhD., Inorganic Chemistry
- Alma mater: University of Puerto Rico

Angel A. Martí is a nanoscience and biophysical inorganic chemist and academic. He is chair of the Department of Chemistry and professor at Rice University.

Martí's research focuses on designing multifunctional molecular systems for understanding amyloid structures, alongside the study of nanomaterials such as boron-nitride nanotubes and developing photoactive soft materials. He has received the 2014 New Investigator Award from the American Society for Photobiology, the Stanley C. Israel Award from the American Chemical Society in 2022, and the Robert Holland Jr. Award from the Research Corporation for Science Advancement in 2025.

Martí is a fellow of the Royal Society of Chemistry, the American Chemical Society, and the American Association for the Advancement of Science.

== Education ==
Martí earned a BS in chemistry in 1999 and a PhD in inorganic chemistry in 2004, both from the University of Puerto Rico under Jorge L. Colón. He did his postdoc at Columbia University with Nicholas Turro in photochemistry and photobiology.

== Career ==
Martí began his academic career at Rice University as an assistant professor of Chemistry and Bioengineering in 2008. He was appointed associate professor in 2015 and professor in 2020, a position he continues to hold. In 2023, he assumed the roles of faculty director of the Rice Emerging Scholars Program (RESP) and chair of the Department of Chemistry at Rice University. Additionally, he was elected chair of the American Chemical Society Division of Inorganic Chemistry (ACS DIC) for the 2024–2026 term. Previously, at ACS DIC, he held the position of secretary from 2021 to 2023.

== Research ==
Martí's work has focused on multifunctional molecules for treating amyloid diseases, detecting DNA, mRNA, and proteins in biological systems, nanomaterials, and surfactants. and his research has been supported by grants from the National Science Foundation, the National Institutes of Health (NIH) and the Welch Foundation.

Martí has conducted research on the dispersion and purification of boron nitride and nanomaterials, developing approaches to stabilize and functionalize them in solution with and without covalent methods. His studies have explored carbon nanotubes in polymer composites, emphasizing their use in biotechnology sensors, substrate integration, and single-walled nanotube processing and composites. In addition, he has made contributions to the chemistry and synthesis of graphene quantum dots, graphene, and other carbon nanomaterials.

Martí was among the first to investigate the use of luminescent metal complexes, such as ruthenium(II) dipyridophenazine and rhenium(I) compounds, to track amyloid-β fibrillization, and link the amyloid aggregates to neurodegenerative diseases. Using rhenium photocatalysts, his team identified specific binding sites on the amyloid-β fibril, particularly a hydrophobic cleft around valine-18 and phenylalanine-20. His group also discovered enhanced luminescence upon binding of both a rhenium tricarbonyl–dppz complex and a ruthenium–dppz complex to amyloid-β aggregates, with the rhenium complex inducing peptide oxidation and the ruthenium complex showing reduced quenching by water.

Martí's other work includes research on fluorescent surfactants, layered materials, fullerenes, zeolites, and fluorescent probes.

== Awards and honors ==
- 2013 – Young Investigator Award, Inter-American Photochemical Society
- 2014 – New Investigator Award, American Society for Photobiology
- 2019 – Presidential Mentoring Award, Rice University
- 2020 – Fellow, Royal Society of Chemistry
- 2022 – Stanley C. Israel Award, American Chemical Society
- 2024 – Fellow, American Chemical Society
- 2024 – Fellow, American Association for the Advancement of Science
- 2025 – Robert Holland Jr. Award, Research Corporation for Science Advancement

== Selected articles ==
- Jiang, C.; Saha, A.; Young, C. C.; Hashim, D. P.; Ramirez, C.; Ajayan, P. M.; Pasquali, M.; Martí, A. A. (2014). "Macroscopic Nanotube Fibers Spun from Single-Walled Carbon Nanotube Polyelectrolytes". ACS Nano. 8 (9): 9107–9112. Bibcode:2014ACSNa...8.9107J. doi:10.1021/nn502552q. PMID 25162378.
- Jiang, B.; Aliyan, A.; Cook, N. P.; Augustine, A.; Bhak, G.; Maldonado, R.; Smith McWilliams, A.; Flores, E.; Mendez Dinamarca, N. G.; Godoy, F.; Montenegro, J.; Gonzalez-Moreno, I.; Martí, A. A. (2019). "Monitoring the Formation of Amyloid Oligomers Using Photoluminescence Anisotropy". Journal of the American Chemical Society. 141 (38): 15605–15610. Bibcode:2019JAChS.14115605J. doi:10.1021/jacs.9b06966. hdl:10668/14520. PMID 31536338.
- Aliyan, A.; Cook, N. P.; Martí, A. A. (2019). "Interrogating Amyloid Aggregates using Fluorescent Probes". Chemical Reviews. 119 (18): 11819–11856. doi:10.1021/acs.chemrev.9b00404. PMID 31675223.
- Smith McWilliams, A. D.; Martinez-Jimenez, C.; Matatyaho-Ya'akobi, A.; Ginestra, C. J.; Talmon, Y.; Pasquali, M.; Martí, A. A. (2021). "Understanding the Exfoliation and Dispersion of Hexagonal Boron Nitride by Surfactants". ACS Applied Nano Materials. 4 (1): 142–151. doi:10.1021/acsanm.0c02437.
- Umezaki, U.; Smith McWilliams, A. D.; Tang, Z.; He, Z. M. S.; Siqueira, I. R.; Corr, S. J.; Ryu, H.; Kolomeisky, A.; Pasquali, M.; Martí, A. A. (2024). "Brownian Diffusion of Hexagonal Boron Nitride Nanosheets and Graphene in Two Dimensions". ACS Nano. 18 (3): 2446–2454. Bibcode:2024ACSNa..18.2446U. doi:10.1021/acsnano.3c11053. PMID 38207242.
- Chen, Y.; Ya'akobi, A.-M.; Nguyen, T.-V.; Kao, S.-C.; West, J. G.; Biswal, S.-L.; Talmon, Y.; Martí, A. A. (2025). "Supramolecular Self-Assembly of Metal Complex Surfactants (MeCS) into Micellar Nanoscale Reactors in Aqueous Solution". Chemical Science. 16 (25): 3440–3446. doi:10.1039/D4SC07623K. PMC 11808396. PMID 39935512.
