= Shanghai Business Review =

Shanghai Business Review (SBR)
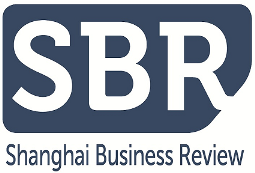
- Format: Business Magazine & Online Economic News
- Owner(s): Middle Kingdom Media Ltd.
- Publisher: Tommy Jiang Zhaoxing
- President: Zhiwei Qiao
- Editor: Geoff de Freitas
- Founded: 2004
- Headquarters: Shanghai, China
- Readership: 50,000 per issue
- ISSN: 1813-310X
- Website: www.SBRChina.com

The Shanghai Business Review (Chinese: 上海商业评论, Pinyin: Shànghǎi Shāngyè Pínglùn; also referred to as SBR) is an English bi-monthly business magazine and news website produced in Shanghai. It was founded in 2004 and is published by Middle Kingdom Media Ltd. in Hong Kong. It is known for international and local business information on China and its enterprises.

== Description ==
The magazine focuses on providing a comprehensive summary of the main business developments in China and on issues of practical importance to international companies in Shanghai and the surrounding economic region. In addition, SBR also publishes a weekly newsletter on business highlights and daily online news briefs.

== Editorial ==
Shanghai Business Review's coverage primarily focuses on the key issues relevant to senior management of international companies operating in and around Shanghai and across China. Special Reports include Country Focus, Industry Review, Sector Survey, and City Focus, along with regular columns such as Market Insights, View from the Top, News Briefs, and Offshore Regulatory Review.

Country Focus looks at the activities in China of companies from a particular foreign country and the contribution they make to the growth and economic development of Shanghai and the Yangtze River Delta region. Throughout 2022, in-depth Country Focus reports covered Jordan, Turkey, Pakistan, Italy, Germany, the Philippines, Thailand, the United States, and more. Industry Focus, Sector Survey, and City Focus are comprehensive overviews of recent business trends, profiles of the leading companies, and a look at the investment opportunities in a particular industry sector or Chinese city.
