= International Journal of Behavioral Nutrition and Physical Activity =

- Discipline: Nutrition science, exercise science
- Language: English
- Edited by: Richard Rosenkranz, University of Nevada, Las Vegas, USA and Melanie Hingle, University of Arizona, Tucson, USA

Publication details
- History: 2004-present
- Publisher: BioMed Central
- Open access: Yes
- Impact factor: 8.7 (2022)

Standard abbreviations
- ISO 4: Int. J. Behav. Nutr. Phys. Act.

Indexing
- ISSN: 1479-5868
- OCLC no.: 54464493

Links
- Journal homepage; Online archive; Editorial board

The International Journal of Behavioral Nutrition and Physical Activity is an open access scientific journal covering behavioral aspects of nutrition and the study of physical activity, including a rigorous peer review process. It is the official journal of the International Society of Behavioral Nutrition and Physical Activity. It was established in 2004 and is published by BioMed Central, part of Springer Nature. Leading a large international editorial board, the editors-in-chief are Professor Richard Rosenkranz, University of Nevada, Las Vegas, and Professor Melanie Hingle University of Arizona USA. According to the Journal Citation Reports, the journal has a 2-year impact factor of 5.6 and 5-year impact factor of 7.5 in 2023.
