= Patrice Evans =

American journalist (born 1976)

- Born: March 2, 1976 (age 50); New York City, U.S.
- Occupations: Writer, satirist
- Writing career
- Pen name: The Assimilated Negro, T.A.N.
- Notable work: Negropedia
- Website: www.theassimilatednegro.com

Patrice Evans (born March 2, 1976) is an American writer and satirist, and author of Negropedia: The Assimilated Negro’s Crash Course on the Modern Black Experience. Evans also writes under the pen-name "The Assimilated Negro." He is currently a staff writer for Grantland.

Evans was born in the Bronx, New York. He went to prep schools Choate Rosemary Hall and Pomfret School, and attended Trinity College in Hartford, CT. He lives in New York City.
