= Russell L. Adams =

American author and academic (1930–2025)

- Born: Russell Lee Adams; August 13, 1930; Baltimore, Maryland, U.S.
- Died: February 17, 2025 (aged 94)
- Education: Washington Street High School; Morehouse College; University of Chicago
- Occupations: Author, academic
- Known for: Chair of Afro-American studies Department, Howard University

Russell Lee Adams (August 13, 1930 – February 17, 2025) was an American author and academic. He was the Chairman of the Afro-American studies Department at Howard University, Washington, D.C.

== Life and career ==
Russell Lee Adams was born on August 13, 1930, in Baltimore, Maryland, to James Russell Adams and Lilly B. (Ponder) Adams. He received his elementary and high-school education in Quitman, Georgia, graduating from Washington Street High School in 1948. He received a scholarship to attend Morehouse College, Atlanta, where he majored in political science and sociology, earning his B.A. degree in 1952, and going on to the University of Chicago, where in 1954 he earned an M.A. degree, and where he would later return to receive a Ph.D. in 1971.

In 1965, Adams worked as an assistant professor and chair department of political science at the North Carolina Central University in Durham, North Carolina. In 1969, Adams became an associate professor at the University of the District of Columbia. In 1971, Adams was hired as chair of the Department of Afro-American Studies at Howard University.

Throughout his work, Adams focused on the emergence of the Afro-American studies as an academic field, in addition to his long interest in cultural and curriculum diversity. Adams has published and edited several books, articles, and collections. He is the author of the biographical reference book Great Negroes Past and Present (1963), "leading American Negroes", a series of film strips for which he received the George Washington Honor Medal (1966), and The Pursuit of Power in Black America in the Nineteenth Century: A Study of the Emergence of Black Politically Oriented Voluntarism (1971).

He was a member of the National Conference of Black Political Scientists, the National Association for the Study of Afro-American Life and History, and the National Association for the Advancement of Colored People (NAACP). He has lectured at many universities throughout the United States, Caribbean, Europe, Israel, and South Africa.

Adams was married to Eleanor McCurine and had two children, Sabrina and Russell Lowell Adams. He lived with his wife in Laurel, Maryland. Adams died on February 17, 2025, at the age of 94.

== Sources ==
- Contemporary Authors Online, Gale, 2002.
- The Department of Afro-American studies: Dr. Russell L. Adams from College of Art and Science, Howard University.
- Russell L. Adams Biography from The History Makers.
- Appearances on C-SPAN

Unfortunately my grandfather passed away in August of 2025
