= John Hopps (physicist) =

American physicist and politician

John H. Hopps (1939 – May 14, 2004) was an American physicist and politician. A native of Dallas, Texas, Hopps was a Ford Scholar to Morehouse College, also receiving degrees from the Massachusetts Institute of Technology (where he was a member of Omega Psi Phi fraternity) and Brandeis University. After his graduation in 1971, Hopps joined the faculty at Ohio State University, and later accepted a research position in nuclear engineering at MIT, and was a member of leadership at the Charles Stark Draper Laboratory.

In 1992, Hopps joined the National Science Foundation, where he was director of the division of materials sciences, and in 1995 returned to Morehouse, where he became provost and senior vice-president. Hopps was appointed by President George W. Bush as deputy Undersecretary of Defense, in 2001, where he oversaw research for defense and engineering, a position he held until his death on 14 May 2004 in Potomac, Maryland.
