= Zaida Morales-Martínez =

American chemist

- Born: Naranjito, Puerto Rico
- Education: University of Puerto Rico (BS): Pennsylvania State University (MS)
- Awards: Presidential Award for Excellence in Science, Mathematics, and Engineering Mentoring
- Scientific career
- Fields: Chemistry
- Workplaces: Florida International University

Zaida Morales-Martínez is an American chemist and professor. She is currently professor emeritus of chemistry at Florida International University.

== Early life and education ==
Zaida Morales-Martínez was born in Naranjito, Puerto Rico, as the oldest of three children. Her mother was a schoolteacher. She attended a Catholic high school. She graduated from the University of Puerto Rico in 1957 with a bachelor of science degree in chemistry. In 1962, she graduated from Pennsylvania State University with a Master of Science.

== Career ==
Morales-Martínez was an assistant professor at University of Puerto Rico from 1962 until 1967, and an instructor at Florida State University from 1967 until 1973. Afterwards, she joined the faculty of Florida International University. She became professor emeritus of chemistry at FIU in 2003.

In 2002, Morales-Martínez received the Women Chemists Committee Regional Award for Contributions to Diversity from the American Chemical Society (ACS). In 2018, she received a Presidential Award for Excellence in Science, Mathematics, and Engineering Mentoring. She was named a fellow of the ACS in 2020.

The Zaida C. Morales Martinez Prize for Outstanding Mentoring of ACS Scholars was established through a donation from The Camille and Henry Dreyfus Foundation, and is awarded to exceptional members of the American Chemical Society's mentorship program.
