= Edward A. Jones =

American academic and diplomat

Edward Allen Jones (1903–1981) was an African-American linguist, scholar and diplomat. He is best known for his book A Candle in the Dark: A History of Morehouse College.

== Early life and education ==
E.A. Jones was born to George and Carrie Jones of Indianola, Mississippi. He entered a prep academy at the age of fifteen in 1918 where he began the study of Latin and Greek languages.

Jones received his bachelor's degree from Morehouse College in 1926, where he was the school's valedictorian. He received his master's degree from Middlebury College in 1930 and his Ph.D. from Cornell University in 1943.

In 1929, Jones studied at Grenoble University in France where he received a Certificate d’Etudes Francais (with special mention). The following year Jones was awarded a fellowship to study at Middlebury University by the General Education Board.

== Career ==
Jones began his teaching career at Edward Waters College. Thereafter, he embarked upon a distinguished forty-year career as professor of French and the Fuller E. Callaway chair of the department of Modern Foreign Languages at Morehouse College. As a researcher, Jones received the Corson French Prize at Cornell University in 1942 and was a Romance Language and Literature Scholar at Cornell from 1942 to 1943. In 1944, he was elected into Phi Kappa Phi chapter.

In 1968, Jones received the Ford Foundation Sabbatical Research fellowship, during which he published several books and articles. He was elected into Phi Beta Kappa in 1960 and was listed in the Outstanding Educators in America in 1972.

In 1970, he was appointed by President Léopold Sédar Senghor as the honorary Consul to Senegal and in 1977 he became the editor of the College Language Association Journal (CLA).

== Personal life ==
He was married to Virginia Lacy Jones, a GED Fellow at the University of Illinois and the second African American to earn a Ph.D. in Library Science in the nation (from the University of Chicago).

== Famous quotes ==
"It is better to light a candle in the dark than to curse the darkness." (A Candle in the Dark)

"Stop complaining about what has been done, and get down to the business of doing something yourself. Get out and make something of yourself. Force yourself into the mainstream. Be competitive. Instead of expecting handouts and special considerations, exploit your own abilities."

== Selected works ==
- A Candle in the Dark: A History of Morehouse College (Judson Press, 1967)
- Voices of Negritude (1971)
- The Autobiography of Daddy King as Told to Edward A. Jones
- Morehouse College: In Business Ninety Years – Building Men (The Phylon Quarterly, 1957)
- Black French Colonial Administrator (The Phylon Quarterly, 1973)
