= Robert E. Johnson (editor) =

American magazine editor (1922–1996)

- Born: August 13, 1922; Montgomery, Alabama
- Died: January 1996; Chicago
- Occupations: Publisher and Editor
- Spouse: Naomi "Nemi" Cole Johnson
- Children: Bobbye Johnson, Janet Johnson-Vinion and Robert III
- Parent(s): Delia Johnson, Robert E. Johnson

Robert Edward "Bob" Johnson (August 13, 1922 in Montgomery, Alabama – January 1996 in Chicago) was Associate Publisher and Executive Editor of JET Magazine. He joined the JET staff in February 1953, two years after it was founded by Publisher John H. Johnson. He was part of the Presidential Press Corps in 1972 that traveled with United States President Richard Nixon to Russia, Poland, Austria and Iran and traveled with Ambassador Andrew Young on a trade mission tour of Africa in 1979. He was the author of Bill Cosby: In Words and Pictures (ISBN 978-0-87485-084-0).

== Education ==
Johnson graduated from Morehouse College in 1948, and from Syracuse University with a Masters of Journalism in 1952.
