= Bill Cosby sexual assault cases =

Cases surrounding sexual assault allegations against American entertainer

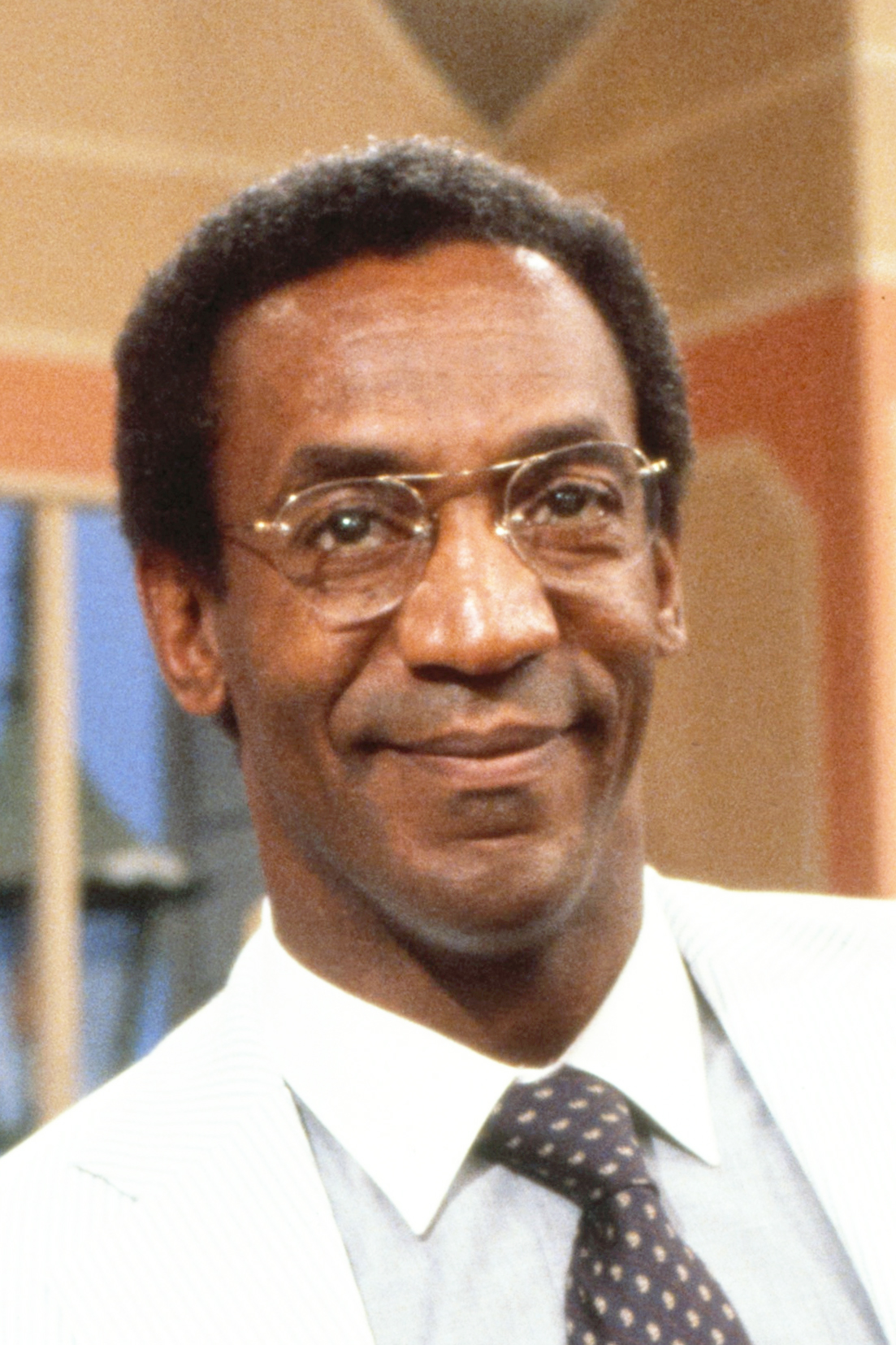
Bill Cosby in 1980

In 2014, multiple allegations emerged that Bill Cosby, a film, television, and stand-up comedy star often cited as a trailblazer for African Americans in the entertainment industry, had sexually assaulted dozens of women throughout his career. Cosby was well known in the United States for the fatherly image he conveyed through his portrayal of Cliff Huxtable in the sitcom The Cosby Show (1984–1992) and gained a reputation as "America's Dad", but the allegations ended his career and sharply diminished his status as a pop culture icon. He received numerous awards and honorary degrees throughout his career, many of which were revoked. There were previous allegations against Cosby, but they were dismissed and accusers were ignored or disbelieved.

Over 60 women have accused Cosby of rape, drug-facilitated sexual assault, sexual battery, child sexual abuse, and sexual harassment. The earliest incidents allegedly took place in the mid-1960s. Assault allegations against Cosby became more public after a stand-up routine by fellow comedian Hannibal Buress in October 2014, alluding to Cosby's covert sexual misbehavior; thereafter, many additional claims were made. The dates of the alleged incidents span from 1965 to 2008 in ten U.S. states and one Canadian province. Cosby has maintained his innocence and repeatedly denied the allegations, but they nonetheless have effectively ended his career and destroyed his legacy. Amid the allegations, numerous organizations severed ties with Cosby and revoked honors and titles awarded to him. Media organizations pulled reruns of The Cosby Show and other television programs featuring Cosby from syndication. Ninety-seven colleges and universities rescinded honorary degrees.

Most of the alleged acts fall outside the statute of limitations for criminal legal proceedings, but criminal charges were filed against Cosby in one case and numerous civil lawsuits were brought against him. As of November 2015, eight related civil suits were active against him. Gloria Allred represented 33 of the alleged victims. In July 2015, some court records were unsealed and released to the public from Andrea Constand's 2005 civil suit against Cosby, concerning a sexual assault in Cosby's home in January 2004; at that time, no criminal charges were filed. The full transcript of his deposition was released to the media by a court reporting service. In his testimony, Cosby admitted to casual sex involving recreational use of the sedative-hypnotic methaqualone (Quaaludes) with a series of young women but with their full consent and knowledge, and he acknowledged that his dispensing of the prescription drug was illegal. In December 2015, three Class II felony charges of aggravated indecent assault were filed against Cosby in Montgomery County, Pennsylvania, based on allegations by Constand concerning incidents in January 2004. Cosby's first trial in June 2017 ended in a mistrial. Cosby was found guilty of three counts of aggravated indecent assault at retrial on April 26, 2018 and on September 25, 2018, he was sentenced to three to ten years in state prison and fined $25,000 plus the cost of the prosecution, $43,611.

Cosby appealed on June 25, 2019, and the verdict was subsequently upheld and granted an appeal by the Pennsylvania Supreme Court. On June 30, 2021, the Pennsylvania Supreme Court found that an agreement with previous prosecutor Bruce Castor prevented Cosby from being charged in the case, and overruled the conviction. The Supreme Court's decision prevents him from being tried on the same charges a third time. The Montgomery County district attorney's office filed a certiorari petition asking the U.S. Supreme Court to hear the case, but on March 7, 2022, the petition was denied, making the decision of the state supreme court final. Cosby's legal issues continued following his release from prison. In 2014, Judy Huth had filed a civil suit against Cosby in California, alleging that he had sexually assaulted her in 1975 at age 16. The trial began in 2022, and the jury ruled in Huth's favour. Cosby was ordered to pay $500,000 in compensatory damages. In 2023, nine women filed sexual assault suits against Cosby. In 2026, Cosby was found liable for drugging and raping Donna Motsinger in 1972 and was ordered to pay her $19.25 million for pain and suffering, plus $40 million in punitive damages.

== Background ==
=== 1965–1996 allegations ===
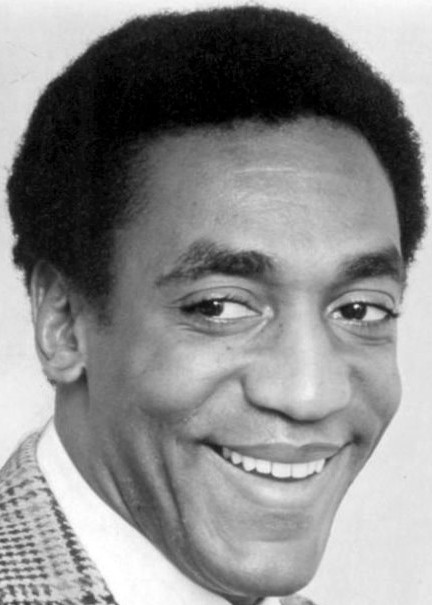
Cosby in 1969

The earliest allegation against Bill Cosby dates back to December 1965: in 2005, Kristina Ruehli came forward as Jane Doe #12 in the Andrea Constand case and alleged that Cosby drugged and assaulted her then in his Beverly Hills home. Further, Ruehli said she told her boyfriend about the incident, and told her daughter in the 1980s.

In the early 1980s, Joan Tarshis told freelance reporter John Milward about an alleged sexual assault by Cosby. Milward did not write about the allegations. In 1996, Playboy Playmate Victoria Valentino gave a videotaped interview in which she made sexual assault allegations against Cosby. The interview was conducted for an exposé on the lives of Playboy models, which was never published.

After the allegations resurfaced in 2014, Wendy Williams recalled that during her radio show in 1990, she referred to sexual assault allegations against Cosby published in the National Enquirer tabloid. Williams said Cosby called her boss during the broadcast demanding that Williams be fired.

=== Later allegations and investigations (2000–2006) ===
On February 1, 2000, according to a statement by Detective Jose McCallion of the New York County District Attorney's Special Victims Bureau, Lachele Covington, who was 20 years old at the time, filed a criminal complaint against Cosby alleging that on January 28, 2000, at his Manhattan townhouse, he tried to put her hands down his pants and exposed himself. Covington also alleged that Cosby grabbed her breasts and tried to put his hands down her pants. Cosby was questioned and insisted "it was not true." The New York City Police Department (NYPD) referred her complaint to the D.A., but they declined to prosecute.

In January 2004, Andrea Constand, a former Temple University employee, accused Cosby of drugging and fondling her; however, in February 2005, Montgomery County, Pennsylvania's District Attorney said there would be no charges due to insufficient credible and admissible evidence. Constand then filed a civil claim in March 2005, with thirteen women as potential witnesses if the case went to trial. Cosby settled out of court for an undisclosed amount in November 2006. After learning that charges were not pursued in the Constand case, California lawyer Tamara Lucier Green, the only publicly-named woman in the prior case, alleged in February 2005 that Cosby drugged and assaulted her in the 1970s. Cosby's lawyer said Cosby did not know her and that the events did not happen.

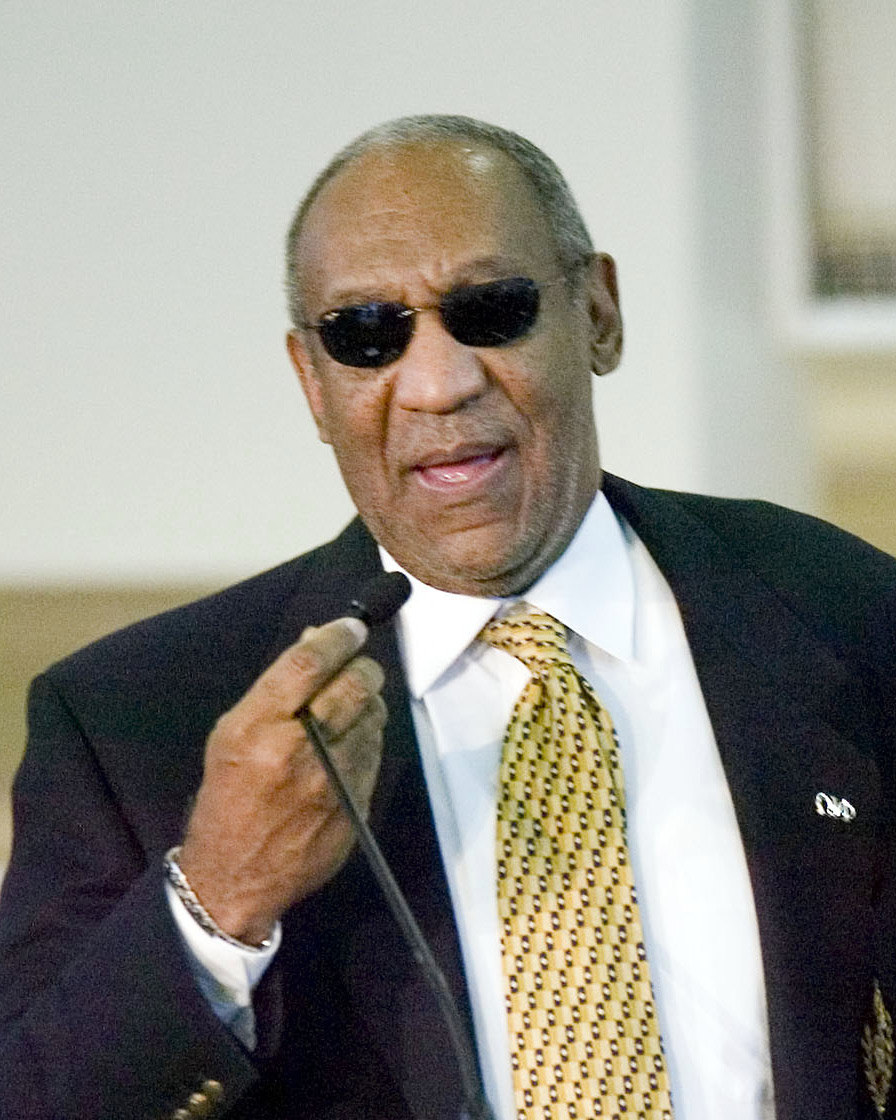
Cosby in 2006

In a July 2005 Philadelphia Daily News interview, Beth Ferrier, an anonymous "Jane Doe" witness in the Constand case, alleged that in 1984 Cosby drugged her coffee and she awoke with her clothes partially removed. In 2005, Shawn Upshaw Brown, a woman with whom Cosby admitted to having an extramarital affair in the 1970s, claimed in the National Enquirer that Cosby drugged and raped her the last time the two were together sexually. Brown is the mother of Autumn Jackson, who claims to be Cosby's illegitimate daughter. Jackson was convicted in 1997 of extortion after she threatened to make the claims public in the Globe tabloid. In 2015, Brown went into more detail with her renewed allegations in an interview.

On June 9, 2006, Philadelphia magazine published an article by Robert Huber which gave graphic detail about Constand's allegations, and the similar stories told by Green and Ferrer about how they too were drugged and sexually assaulted. With these severe allegations against Cosby, Huber wrote: "His lawyers have gotten it pushed to the back burner, down to a simmer, and maybe it will amount to nothing, yet there is also the possibility that it will bubble up to destroy him." The article was titled Dr. Huxtable & Mr. Hyde, an allusion to both Cosby's character Dr. Cliff Huxtable on The Cosby Show and to a person having two starkly distinct "Jekyll and Hyde" personalities. This article also presented Barbara Bowman, who came forward after reading about Constand's story, saying she could not sit in silence any longer. Details of Bowman's similar drug and sexual assault allegations were published in the magazine's November 1, 2006, issue. Bowman reported two incidents occurring around early 1986, wherein she was eighteen years old and working as an aspiring model and actress after her agent introduced her to Cosby and he became a good friend and mentor, saying that she escaped his attacks, returned home to Denver, and Cosby thereafter subverted her career.

=== Hannibal Buress remarks (October 2014) ===
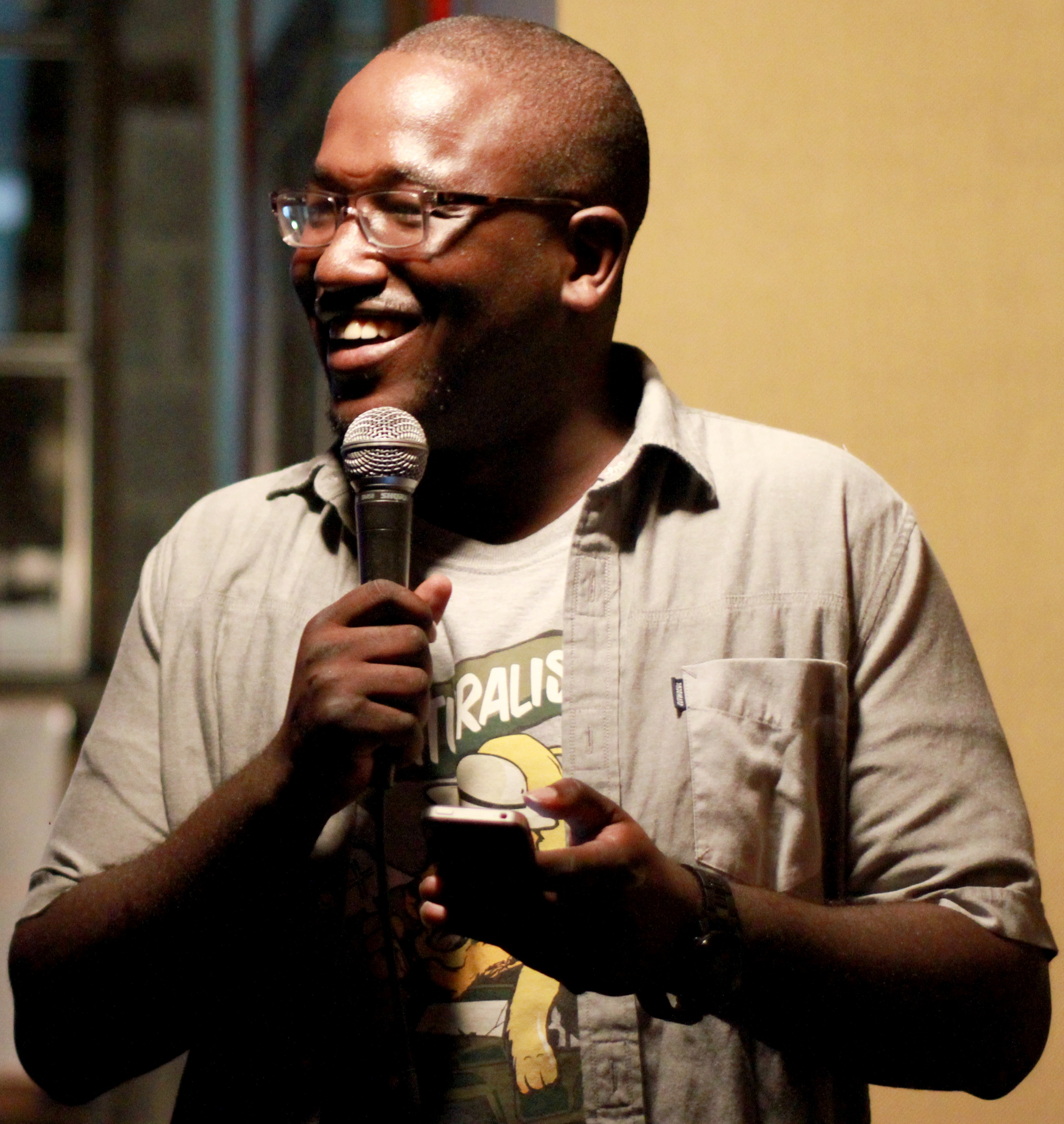
In a 2014 stand-up act, Hannibal Buress (pictured) publicly accused Cosby of rape.

On October 16, 2014, as part of a stand-up comedy routine in Philadelphia, Hannibal Buress addressed Cosby's legacy of "talk[ing] down" to young black men about their mode of dress and lifestyle. Buress criticized the actor's public moralizing by saying, "Yeah, but you rape women, Bill Cosby, so turn the crazy down a couple notches." When the audience appeared to respond to Buress's accusation as an incredulous joke, he encouraged everyone to search "Bill Cosby rape" on Google.

Buress had used the same Cosby routine for the previous six months with little response, but word of the October performance spread rapidly after being posted on Philadelphia magazine's website. Media coverage intensified, with numerous publications tackling the question of how Cosby managed to maintain, as Buress called it in his routine, a "teflon image" despite over a decade of public sexual abuse accusations.

Shortly afterward, USA Today reported that either Cosby or his representative posted a request for Twitter followers to "Go ahead. Meme me!" The tweet was deleted after a large number of submitted memes referenced the accusations against Cosby.

=== Additional assault allegations ===
After Buress's remarks came to the attention of journalist Joan Tarshis, in November 2014, model Janice Dickinson, actress Louisa Moritz, actor Lou Ferrigno's wife Carla, Florida nurse Therese Serignese, Playboy Playmates Valentino and Sarita Butterfield, actress Michelle Hurd, and eleven other women also made accusations of assaults by Cosby committed against them between 1965 and 2004. Charlotte Laws wrote a November 2014 article published by Salon accusing Cosby of assaulting a friend of hers, with whom she subsequently had lost contact. The following month, in a Vanity Fair article, model Beverly Johnson alleged that she was drugged by Cosby during a 1986 audition, and that she knew other women with similar accounts.

Cosby's attorney said Dickinson's account differed from her prior accounts of the incident and released a statement that said in part: "Mr. Cosby does not intend to dignify these allegations with any comment." A follow-up statement dismissed the allegations as "unsubstantiated" and an example of "media vilification". A joint statement from Cosby and Constand, who had received a civil settlement in 2006, clarified the statement released a few days prior by stating that it did not refer to Constand's case, which was resolved years ago.

In January 2015, Cindra Ladd alleged that Cosby drugged and sexually assaulted her in 1969. In May 2015, Lili Bernard claimed that Cosby sexually assaulted her in the early 1990s, and that she was interviewed by police in Atlantic City, New Jersey, regarding the allegation. Because New Jersey has no statute of limitations for rape, Bernard hoped charges would be brought, but media reports noted "it wasn't clear [...] if what [Bernard] says happened to her happened in New Jersey."

On July 27, 2015, New York magazine's cover featured images of 35 women sitting in chairs with the last chair empty, suggesting there may be more victims who had not come forward yet. The 35 women told "their stories about being assaulted by Bill Cosby, and the culture that wouldn't listen." Eleven other women known to New York who alleged sexual assault by Cosby declined to be photographed and interviewed for the feature. According to Vox, the stories span "more than five decades" and are "remarkably similar, typically involving the comedian offering a woman a cup of coffee or some sort of alcoholic beverage—which may be spiked with drugs—and allegedly sexually assaulting the victim as she's impaired or unconscious."

On September 17, 2015, A&E broadcast the documentary Cosby: The Women Speak, a program in which thirteen alleged victims were interviewed. By October 24, nearly sixty women had claimed Cosby had sexually abused them, and the terms "sociopath" and "serial rapist" were used to describe him. Cosby accuser Jewell Allison described him as a "sociopath" and stated: "We may be looking at America's greatest serial rapist that ever got away with this for the longest amount of time. He got away with it because he was hiding behind the image of Cliff Huxtable."

=== Table of accusers' allegations ===
Cosby has been accused by over sixty women of rape, drug facilitated sexual assault, sexual battery, child sexual abuse, or other sexual misconduct. The earliest alleged incidents took place in the mid-1960s, with the rest covering the period up to 2008. In 2023, a new victim came out alleging to have been raped by Cosby.

Cosby attorney Marty Singer stated, "There is virtually no standard by which the media are holding Mr Cosby's accusers [...] Anyone and everyone who wants to file a suit or get on television can be guaranteed fawning coverage. The very same media have demonstrated an unconscionable disinterest in the veracity of his accusers and their motives."

Cosby has maintained his innocence and repeatedly denied the allegations. In November 2014, in response to a question about the allegations, Cosby said: "I don't talk about it." Cosby has declined to discuss publicly the accusations in past interviews. However, he told Florida Today: "people shouldn't have to go through that and shouldn't answer to innuendos." In May 2015, he said "I have been in this business 52 years and I've never seen anything like this. Reality is a situation and I can't speak."

Alleged victim	Alleged offense	Alleged drug involvement	Year	Location	First report	Details of allegation
Barbara Bowman^{*}	Rape	Yes	1986	New York City; Atlantic City, New Jersey	2005	One of the most outspoken accusers. Claims Cosby mentored her until she turned 18, then offered her a drug-laced glass of wine and raped her in his New York home. Later allegedly attempted to assault her in Atlantic City and destroy her career when she fought back.
Beverly Johnson	Attempted assault	Yes	1980s	New York City	2013	Claims Cosby offered her a spiked espresso but she was able to resist his actions and leave his house. She related this episode in a Vanity Fair article and in her memoirs that were released in August 2015. Cosby subsequently started a defamation suit against her in December 2015.
Louisa Moritz	Sexual Assault	No	1971	New York City	2014	Claims Cosby forced oral sex backstage at The Tonight Show Starring Johnny Carson.
Kristina Ruehli	Rape	Yes	1965	Los Angeles, California	2014	Claims Cosby invited her to a "party" at his house where she was the only guest. Cosby then allegedly drugged and raped her.
Therese Serignese^{*}	Rape	Yes	1976	Las Vegas, Nevada	2005	Claims Cosby randomly approached her at the Las Vegas Hilton where he was performing and asked her if she wanted to go to his show. Serignese attended his comedy show and after he gave her Quaaludes before raping her. Cosby admitted under oath in his 2005 deposition: "I give her Quaaludes. We then have sex." He also stated he made payments to her in 1996 for an educational pledge he previously made to her. Serignese was Jane Doe #10 in Constand's civil case against Cosby.
Tamara Green^{*}	Sexual assault	Yes	1970s	Los Angeles, California	2005	Was feeling ill one day while working at Cosby's restaurant, Cafe Figaro. Cosby allegedly offered her a "decongestant" then drove her to his house, where he attempted to rape her. Green alleges she was conscious enough to fight back. Was the only witness in Constand's case to be publicly named at the time. She is the lead plaintiff in Green et al. vs. Cosby defamation suit that includes six other women as plaintiffs.
Beth Ferrier^{*}	Other	Yes	1980s	Denver, Colorado	2005	Ferrier says she was in a consensual relationship with Cosby for several months, but some time after breaking up, claims that he drugged her when she visited him before a performance in Denver. She claimed she woke up in a car in a parking lot with her clothes disheveled, after Cosby offered her a cup of coffee the night before.
Joan Tarshis	Rape	Yes	1969	Los Angeles, California	1980s	Claims Cosby mixed her a drink while they were working together, and awoke to Cosby raping her. Originally told her story to a reporter in the 1980s who declined to publish it.
Victoria Valentino	Rape	Yes	1970	Los Angeles, California	1996	Claims Cosby offered her pills before driving her to his home. Conscious but too drugged to move, she alleges Cosby turned her over and raped her. Valentino's friend confirmed she detailed the incident to her immediately after it happened. She also mentioned it in a videotaped interview in 1996.
Janice Dickinson	Rape	Yes	1982	Lake Tahoe, Nevada	2002	Claims Cosby had been following her career and invited her to his hotel immediately after she left drug rehab. Alleges Cosby gave her wine and a pill, and she awoke to him raping her. Provided her story in 2002 for her autobiography, but her publisher cut it in fear of being sued. Also made vague allegations in a 2006 interview with Howard Stern, saying she could not give too much detail because she feared being targeted by Cosby.
Carla Ferrigno	Attempted assault	No	1967	Los Angeles, California	2014	Claims that while on a date with a man claiming to work in the record industry, she was taken to a party at Cosby's house, after which her date and Cosby's wife left, leaving the two alone. Alleges Cosby forcefully grabbed and kissed her, repeatedly attempting to get her to have a drink before she insisted on leaving.
Linda Joy Traitz	Sexual assault	Yes	1969	Los Angeles, California	2014	Claims Cosby offered to give her a ride home after her shift at Cafe Figaro. Alleges Cosby instead drove her to a secluded area and opened a briefcase full of pills, groped her, and insisted she take a pill; she declined and demanded to be driven home.
Renita Chaney Hill	Child sexual abuse	Yes	1982	Pittsburgh, Pennsylvania	2014	Claims that, at the age of 15, while she was involved with Cosby's children's show Picture Pages, Cosby made her consume drinks that made her unconscious until the next day; when she complained about the drinks, Cosby said that was the only way she could continue seeing him. Claims she has one memory of Cosby kissing her before she passed out. Cosby paid for her college tuition.
Angela Leslie	Sexual assault	No	1992	Las Vegas, Nevada	2014	Claims that during an acting audition in Cosby's Las Vegas hotel room, he told her to sip from a drink and act intoxicated, although she only pretended to sip it. He then allegedly stripped and forced Leslie's hand on his penis but told her to leave when she resisted. Afterward, she received regular payments from Cosby.
Lachele Covington	Sexual assault	No	2000	New York City	2000	Claims that after working as an extra on the sitcom Cosby, she visited Cosby's townhouse for career advice, where he attempted to put her hand on his genitals. Covington reported the allegation to the New York City Police Department (NYPD) three days later but no charges were filed.
Patricia Leary Steuer^{*}	Sexual assault	Yes	1978, 1980	Shelburne Falls, Massachusetts; Atlantic City, New Jersey	2015	Claims Cosby invited her to a party at his house, but she was the only guest. After having a drink, claims she woke up unable to remember what happened. In a similar incident two years later, she woke up fully naked.
Linda Kirkpatrick	Sexual assault	Yes	1981	Las Vegas, Nevada	2015	Claims that after she was invited backstage to Cosby's Las Vegas show, he handed her a drink causing her to black out with intermittent memories of Cosby trying to mount her.
Linda Brown	Sexual assault	Yes	1969	Toronto, Ontario, Canada	2015	Claims after she had dinner with Cosby, he insisted on taking her to his hotel, where he offered her a soda. Alleges she then woke up naked as Cosby began to assault her "like a real-life blow-up doll".
Kaya Thompson	Sexual assault	No	1980s	New York City	2015	Claims that on the set of The Cosby Show, Cosby forced himself on her and told her to use a bottle of Lubriderm to pleasure him. He offered her $700 as she left.
Sunni Welles	Sexual assault	Yes	1960s	Los Angeles, California	2015	Claims that Cosby offered her drinks at a jazz club, then remembers only waking up naked the next day. Unsure what happened, alleges she accepted another invitation to meet Cosby where she again had a drink and then woke up naked.
"Kacey"	Sexual assault	Yes	1996	Los Angeles, California	2015	Claims after a long-running professional relationship with Cosby, on one occasion he insisted she take a white pill to help her relax. Alleges she blacked out and awoke next to Cosby in bed. Came forward in 2015 under condition of anonymity and an assumed name.
Chelan Lasha	Sexual assault	Yes	1986	Las Vegas, Nevada	2014	Claims Cosby offered to help her pursue a modeling career; alleges Cosby lured her to his hotel room, offered her an "antihistamine" and a shot of Amaretto, which knocked her unconscious as Cosby began humping her. Gave her $1,500 when she woke up and left.
Helen Hayes	Other	No	1973	Pebble Beach, California	2014	Claims that after attending the 1973 Celebrity Tennis Tournament, Cosby stalked her throughout the evening until eventually confronting her and groping her breasts. Not to be confused with the actress Helen Hayes.
Heidi Thomas	Sexual Assault	Yes	1984	Reno, Nevada	2015	Claims that during an audition, Cosby instructed her to sip a drink and act intoxicated. After sipping the drink, alleges she became unconscious and awoke to Cosby performing oral sex.
PJ Masten	Rape	Yes	1979	Chicago, Illinois	2014	Claims Cosby invited her to dinner where he offered her a cocktail, knocking her unconscious and woke up later in Cosby's bed naked and bruised. Masten believes she was raped. Claims after she confronted management at the Playboy Club, her supervisor said, "Shut your mouth."
Sarita Butterfield	Other	No	1977	Shelburne Falls, Massachusetts	2014	Claims that Cosby cornered her at a party and groped her breasts but she fended off further advances.
Janice Baker-Kinney	Rape	Yes	1982	Las Vegas, Nevada	2015	Claims that a friend invited her to a party at Cosby's residence, where they were the only guests. Alleges that Cosby offered her a drink, causing her to black out as her friend was leaving. Claims she awoke naked in bed next to Cosby, who was also naked.
Autumn Burns	Rape	Yes	1970	Las Vegas, Nevada	2015	Claims that while working at a Las Vegas casino, Cosby approached her to help her break into the entertainment industry. Alleges he invited her to his hotel suite where he offered her a drink, causing her to feel heavily drugged as Cosby had forcible oral sex.
Lili Bernard	Rape	Yes	1990s	New York City	2015	Claims that in preparation of her guest-starring on The Cosby Show, Cosby mentored her, and that once he gained her total trust, he drugged, raped, and threatened her.
Sammie Mays	Sexual assault	Yes	1987	Las Vegas, Nevada	2015	Claims that Cosby invited her to his suite while she attended a television industry conference in Las Vegas; once alone, she alleges Cosby offered a drink that caused her to black out and awake to find her bra disheveled and Cosby standing over her.
Margie Shapiro	Rape	Yes	1975	Santa Monica, California	2015	Claims Cosby randomly invited her to a party and later a personal visit to the Playboy Mansion, after seeing her in a doughnut shop. At the Mansion, alleges Cosby played a game where she would have to swallow a pill. Claims she regained consciousness while Cosby was raping her.
Joyce Emmons	Other	Yes	1979–1980	Las Vegas, Nevada; New York City	2014	Claims that during Cosby's appearance at her comedy club, he offered her a pill to help a headache. Alleges the next thing she remembers was waking up naked with Cosby's friend, and when confronted, Cosby said he gave her a Quaalude. Further asserts that Cosby repeatedly offered to show off his large collection of drugs to her, even though he never took any drugs himself.
Rebecca Lynn Neal	Rape	Yes	1986	Las Vegas, Nevada	2015	Claims Cosby repeatedly visited the health club where she worked and invited her to his show; upon accepting, alleges that Cosby gave her a shot of Stoli, which rendered her disoriented but still conscious while Cosby raped her, ignoring her weakened pleas to tell him to stop. Says Cosby never visited her health club again.
Jewel Allison	Rape	Yes	1990	New York City	2015	Claims Cosby invited her to his New York townhouse for dinner, where he offered her a glass of wine. Alleges the next thing she remembers was seeing semen on the floor as Cosby helped escort her outside into a cab. Gained distinction for being one of the few African-American women to accuse Cosby.
Lise-Lotte Lublin	Rape	Yes	1989	Las Vegas, Nevada	2015	Claims that during an audition in Cosby's hotel suite, he offered her two shots of liquor, causing her to black out and awaken to Cosby straddling her. Has helped champion new Nevada legislation to extend statute of limitation on rape cases.
Cindra Ladd	Rape	Yes	1969	New York City	2015	Considering herself a friend of Cosby's at the time, Ladd claims that when she once complained of a headache to him, he offered her a pill. Alleges the next thing she remembers is waking up naked with Cosby standing nearby in a robe. As a respected philanthropist and powerful media executive, she became a noteworthy counterbalance to critics who claimed Cosby accusers were seeking money or fame.
Helen Gumpel	Attempted assault	No	1987	New York City	2015	Claims that after being called back for a potentially second appearance on The Cosby Show, Cosby invited her into his dressing room and made repeated advances on her, attempting to get her to have a drink. She declined and did not appear on any future episodes.
Kathy McKee	Rape	No	1973	Detroit, Michigan	2014	Claims that after knowing Cosby personally for eight years, he invited her to his Detroit hotel room where he spun her around and penetrated her.
Charlotte Fox	Rape	No	1970s	Los Angeles, California	2015	Claims that while working on Uptown Saturday Night, she was invited to a party at the Playboy Mansion hosted by Cosby. After drinking at the club, began to feel "incapacitated" as Cosby raped her. Did not explicitly accuse Cosby of drugging her.
Marcella Tate	Rape	Yes	1975	Los Angeles, California	2015	Claims that Cosby offered her a drink during a party at the Playboy Mansion, after which she blacked out and woke up in a bed next to Cosby, who was naked.
Shawn Brown	Rape	Yes	1970s	San Antonio, Texas	1990s	Cosby admitted to this extramarital affair with Brown in the 1990s. She alleged in 2014 that despite their consensual sex, she was not "freaky enough" for him so on one occasion he insisted she drink alcohol and smoke marijuana, leading her to black out while he raped her.
Lisa Jones	Attempted assault	Yes	1986	New York City	2014	Met Cosby when she was 17 and alleges that after she turned 18, Cosby invited her to New York to audition for The Cosby Show where he offered her alcohol and then began trying to spread her legs apart. Claims she was able to escape to avoid further assault.
Judith Huth	Child sexual abuse	Yes	1974	Los Angeles, California	2014	Claims that at age 16, she wandered onto a movie set where Cosby was working. Alleges Cosby took her to his house and plied her with drinks, then to the Playboy Mansion where he instructed her to tell people she was 19, then to a room where he masturbated himself with her hands. Because it is an alleged child sexual abuse case, statute of limitations began when Huth realized the trauma as an adult. A Los Angeles Police Department (LAPD) investigation resulted in no criminal charges; a civil case is currently underway.
Eden Tirl	Sexual harassment	No	1990	New York City	2015	A former actress who guest starred as a police officer on The Cosby Show in 1990, Tirl said she was pulled off the set during taping and groped by Cosby in his dressing room. Tirl said she later told two show staffers what happened but was ignored.
"Elizabeth"	Rape	Yes	1976	Los Angeles, California	2015	Claims she met Cosby while working as a flight attendant and accepted an offer for dinner, where Cosby gave her a glass of sake, causing her to fall into a "trance-like state" where Cosby forced her to perform a sex act she described as "the most horrifying thing that could happen to an innocent young woman." Came forward in 2015 under condition of anonymity and an assumed name.
Jena T.	Sexual assault	No	1988	New York City	2015	Claims Cosby started paying unwanted attention to her while working as a model at age 17–18. Alleges that after she voiced her concerns to Cosby, he offered to buy her a car and then eventually forced her into unspecified sexual activity, giving her $700 as she left.
"Lisa"	Sexual assault	Yes	1988	New York City	2015	Claims Cosby invited her to his home while she was trying to further her modeling career. Alleges Cosby offered her a shot of alcohol, causing her to feel dizzy and out of control while Cosby began petting her as she blacked out. Came forward in 2015 under condition of anonymity and an assumed name.
Michelle Hurd	Attempted assault	No	1995	New York City	2014	Claims Cosby invited her to his dressing room for acting exercises while she was doing stand-in work for The Cosby Show. Alleges that some exercises involved inappropriate touching of her body, leading to Cosby inviting her to his home for a shower. Hurd says she refused and claims Cosby told her to never tell anyone about their acting exercises.
Andrea Constand	Sexual assault	Yes	2004	Philadelphia, Pennsylvania	2005	Cosby invited Constand to his house to discuss career goals after meeting her at Temple University. He provided her pills to relax her anxiety, which he claimed were Benadryl. Afterward, he fondled her and digitally penetrated her, according to his sworn testimony, though he claims it was consensual. Constand alleged sexual abuse to the Philadelphia Police Department, who decided not to file charges against Cosby. Constand then filed a civil lawsuit where thirteen other women came forward to allege similar abuse. The case settled out of court for an undisclosed amount. On December 30, 2015, shortly before the expiry of the statute of limitations for the alleged January 2004 incident, Cosby was charged with sexual assault based on the 2005 allegations by Constand, a reversal of a 2005 decision not to lay a charge. Documents from the case were sealed until the summer of 2015, and the charge was based on new evidence according to the current district attorney for Montgomery County.
Chloe Goins	Sexual assault	Yes	2008	Los Angeles, California	2014	Claims that Cosby drugged and assaulted her while she was at the Playboy Mansion in 2008. In 2015 the LAPD investigated and referred their file to Los Angeles D.A. In 2016, an announcement was made that no charges would be laid because of inadequate evidence and the expiration of the statute of limitations.
Lisa Christie	Attempted assault	No	1989	Chicago, Illinois	2015	Claims that after years of seeing Cosby as a mentor, he offered to audition her for the movie Ghost Dad in his hotel room, whereupon Cosby attempted to kiss her "like a boyfriend" and said he would give her "the biggest orgasm" of her life. When she refused, Cosby told her she would "never make it in this business" unless she slept with him. Christie went on to be Mrs. America less than ten years later.
Pamela Abeyta	Rape	Yes	1979	Las Vegas, Nevada	2015	Claims Cosby offered to help her with her ambitions to become a Playboy model; while having dinner with Cosby, alleges she drank something that caused her to pass out, and when she awoke there were three naked men near her, including Cosby.
Sharon Van Ert	Sexual assault	Yes	1976	Redondo Beach, California	2015	Claims Cosby gave her something to drink while she was working at a jazz club, then walked her to her car when he said she needed to "sober up." She alleges Cosby began caressing her before she blacked out, and when she woke up her panties were missing.
Jane Doe (Multiple)^{*}	Other	Yes	Varied	Varied	2005	Numerous witnesses who agreed to testify in Constand's 2005 civil suit have not come forward publicly. Due to active lawsuits seeking to unseal further details in that case, some Jane Doe witnesses have been contacted in attempts to allow their identities to be revealed.
"Sandy"	Rape	Yes	1980	Las Vegas, Nevada	2014	Television host Charlotte Laws claims her close friend, whom she referred to as "Sandy" in a Salon article, had a consensual sexual relationship with Cosby, but was alarmed one morning when she realized Cosby intentionally drugged her the night before and had sex while she was unconscious. "Sandy" said she could not understand because she would have had no issues having consensual sex with him. Laws further stated that when Constand's allegations came forward in 2005, he joked about whether he had ever drugged her.
Cynthia Myers	Other	Yes	< 1997	Los Angeles, California	< 2011	Prior to Myers' death in 2011, she provided interviews for the book Centerfolds, which was released in 2015. In these undated interviews, Myers claimed she personally witnessed Cosby "use drugs to have sex with women" at the Playboy Mansion, stating that his actions repulsed her so much she could not "shed a tear" when Cosby's son Ennis was murdered in 1997.
Charlotte Kemp	Attempted assault	Yes	1980s	Los Angeles, California	2014	Claims that she was with Valentino on the night Cosby raped her. Alleges she received drinks from Cosby along with Valentino, but passed out in Cosby's home and later left with Valentino before Cosby assaulted her.
Dottye	Rape	Yes	1984	New York City	2015	Claims that Cosby invited her to his New York apartment to audition for The Cosby Show, where he drugged and raped her. Came forward on condition of being identified by only her first name.
Donna Barrett	Sexual assault	No	2004	Philadelphia, Pennsylvania	2015	Claims that during a photo shoot with her track team at the University of Pennsylvania, Cosby grabbed her and forcefully pressed his body against hers.
"Katy"	Rape	Yes	1981	Denver, Colorado	2018	"Katy" claims she was living in Denver in February 1981, where she was working as a cocktail waitress at a nightclub where Cosby performed. Cosby offered her red wine and she blacked out. She awoke the next morning in a strange room naked and covered in bruises. Cosby was standing over her in a robe. She rushed out of the room despite Cosby's attempts to persuade her to stay. She came forward in 2018 under condition of anonymity and an assumed name.
Linda Ridgeway Whitedeer	Sexual assault	No	1970s	Undisclosed	2015	Claims that during a job interview on a movie set, Cosby sexually assaulted her.
Morganne Picard	Rape	Yes	1980s	Undisclosed	2023	Claims that Cosby invited her to the set of The Cosby Show in 1987 where he insisted and encouraged her to drink what made her extremely intoxicated between 1987 and 1990 on multiple occasions. She became incapacitated and woke up to find herself in a hotel room "naked with soreness in her vagina".

^{*} Witness in 2005 Constand civil case

== Criminal investigations ==
=== Constand case ===
==== Unsealing of Constand v. Cosby deposition ====
On July 8, 2015, Constand and her attorney Dolores Troiani filed a motion to negate the confidentiality agreement in the 2005 case against Cosby, claiming Cosby "total[ly] abandon[ed] the confidentiality portions of the agreement" by way of his recent, sweeping denials of all allegations against him. A judge ruled that releasing the sealed documents was justified by Cosby's role as a "public moralist" in contrast to his possible criminal private behavior.

Although some of the files from the Constand case had been unsealed, the transcript of Cosby's several depositions was not among them. Instead, The New York Times obtained the complete transcript from a court reporting service hired by Constand's attorney and released it to the public. After it was discovered that the transcript of the deposition was released, Cosby's lawyers filed a new motion in the case on July 21, 2015, asserting that Constand and Troiani may have orchestrated the release.

In the court filing condemning the release of the deposition, Cosby's attorneys stressed that no testimony actually unsealed by a judge stated that he engaged in non-consensual sex or gave anyone Quaaludes without their knowledge or consent. "Reading the media accounts, one would conclude that the Defendant has admitted to rape," the document said. "And yet the Defendant admitted to nothing more than being one of the many people who introduced Quaaludes into their consensual sex life in the 1970s." Cosby's lawyers further contended that a court reporting service hired by Constand had released the 2005 court transcript to the Times, days earlier, in a "massive breach of protocol". The court reporters' code of ethics prohibits the release of testimony without all parties first being contacted.

In the deposition, Cosby denied any sexual assault of any women but admitted he had used sedatives to help gain their cooperation. He testified that he had obtained Quaaludes from gynecologist Leroy Amar, who knew Cosby had no intention of taking the drugs himself. Cosby instead intended to give them to women he wanted to have sexual relations with and admitted he had given the drug to at least one woman and other people. Cosby admitted knowing it was illegal at the time to dispense the drug to other people. Amar would later have his medical license revoked in California and New York State; he died in 2002.

==== 2015 criminal charges ====
On December 30, 2015, in Montgomery County, Pennsylvania, Cosby was charged with three counts of aggravated indecent assault on Constand as a result of a single incident allegedly occurring at his home in Cheltenham Township on an unspecified date between mid-January and mid-February 2004 (referred to by media coverage as "January 2004"), according to the detailed arrest warrant affidavit filed on December 29, 2015. These were the first criminal charges as a result of sexual assault allegations that had been made by many women against Cosby.

Cosby was arraigned that afternoon without entering a plea; his bail was set at $1 million. Cosby surrendered his passport, posted bond, and was escorted to the Cheltenham Township police station to be booked, fingerprinted, and photographed for a mug shot. The charges were based on Constand's statement to police of unwanted sexual contact (though not intercourse) in early 2004 that had first been reported to the Durham Regional Police Service near Constand's home in southern Ontario, Canada, on January 13, 2005; the report was forwarded to authorities in Pennsylvania. On February 17, 2005, then-district attorney Bruce Castor had released a statement that charges would not be brought at that time.

Constand launched a civil lawsuit against Cosby in 2005 which was confidentially settled in July 2006. Some testimony from that case was unsealed in July 2015. Based on details in that testimony and new interviews with certain witnesses, newly elected District Attorney Kevin Steele decided to file charges on December 30, 2015. The criminal court documents allege that blue pills, said to be Benadryl by Cosby, were given to Constand, who had also been drinking wine during the January 2004 incident.

Cosby's attorney issued a statement saying, "We intend to mount a vigorous defense against this unjustified charge and we expect that Mr. Cosby will be exonerated by a court of law." Cosby's attorneys filed a motion to dismiss the sexual assault charges in January 2016, stating that Castor's office promised in 2005 that Cosby would not be prosecuted. In testimony involving Cosby's motion, Castor defended his decision not to bring charges, citing among other things Constand's year-long delay in reporting the allegations, her continued contact with Cosby, and suggestions that she and her mother might have tried to extort the TV star.

On February 3, 2016, Judge Steven O'Neill ruled "there was no basis" to dismiss the case based on Cosby's assertions. Cosby's legal team sought an appeal before the Superior Court of Pennsylvania; on April 25, 2016, the Superior Court refused to hear Cosby's appeal from the denial of his motion to dismiss, lifted a temporary stay of the pre-trial hearing, and sent the case back to the original court. On April 13, 2016, Cosby filed a motion with the Superior Court to re-seal the deposition from the original Constand lawsuit. His lawyers made a similar request in federal court in Massachusetts earlier, but that motion was denied by Judge David H. Hennessy, who likened these efforts to putting the "toothpaste back in the tube" since Cosby's testimony had already been in the news for months.

At the preliminary hearing on May 24, a judge found that there was enough evidence to proceed with a trial despite the fact that Constand did not testify, which is allowed under Pennsylvania law. He set a pre-trial hearing for September 6. Cosby appealed this decision based upon the belief his legal team had the right to cross-examine the accuser; he lost this appeal on October 12. The Pennsylvania Supreme Court announced it would review the state law in a separate case, to which Cosby's lead attorney, Brian McMonagle, said he would try to add Cosby's case in hopes of having it thrown out. On September 6, 2016, Judge Steven O'Neill set a trial date for June 6, 2017. On April 12, 2017, the Pennsylvania Supreme Court declined to hear Cosby's appeal to question Constand before the trial.

Cosby had faced a maximum of fifteen to thirty years in prison if found guilty on all three counts and a fine up to $25,000. His trial started on June 5, 2017, and ended in mistrial on June 17.

=== Judith Huth ===
On December 16, 2014, after a ten-day investigation, Los Angeles prosecutors declined to file charges against Cosby after Judith Huth claimed the comedian molested her around 1974 at the Playboy Mansion. Huth had met with Los Angeles police detectives for ninety minutes. In rejecting the case, prosecutors evaluated the charge Cosby would have faced in 1974. Prosecutors took into account legislative changes that extended the statute of limitations for certain crimes but found no way that Cosby could be legally prosecuted.

=== Lili Bernard ===
On April 30, 2015, Cuban-American visual artist Lili Bernard filed a sexual assault complaint against Cosby in New Jersey, which has no statute of limitations for sexual assault. On July 1, 2015, prosecutors declined to prosecute Cosby because the alleged offense happened before 1996 (the year the law was changed to remove the statute of limitations).

=== Chloe Goins ===
From July through October 2015, the Los Angeles Police Department (LAPD) conducted a criminal investigation into Cosby's alleged sexual assault of then 18-year-old model Chloe Goins. The following day, in a statement to ABC News, the LAPD said it will explore any sexual assault accusations against Cosby, including accusations for which the statute of limitations has expired, and referred the case to the Los Angeles County D.A.'s office.

As with nearly all other cases of alleged sexual misconduct by Cosby, the statute of limitations has expired on this 2008 case, according to most experts. Nonetheless, an investigation of was opened because "LAPD officials said there were many reasons to investigate sexual assault allegations that fall beyond those legal deadlines. Old accusations may lead investigators to more recent incidents with other victims" and Goins would be allowed to testify if charges were laid in any other (more recent) cases. Cosby's former attorney Martin Singer stated he would provide documentary evidence to the LAPD that established Cosby was in New York on August 9, 2008, the date of the incident alleged by Goins.

On January 6, 2016, the Los Angeles District Attorney's office announced that no charge would be laid because they were "blocked by the statute of limitations or lacked sufficient evidence".

== Trials ==
Cosby's first trial in June 2017 ended in a mistrial. Cosby was found guilty of three counts of aggravated indecent assault at retrial on April 26, 2018 and on September 25, 2018, he was sentenced to three to ten years in state prison and fined $25,000 plus the $43,611 cost of the prosecution.

Cosby appealed on June 25, 2019, and the verdict was subsequently upheld and granted an appeal by the Pennsylvania Supreme Court. On June 30, 2021, the Pennsylvania Supreme Court found that Cosby's agreement with previous prosecutor Bruce Castor prevented him from being charged in the case, and overturned the conviction. The Supreme Court's decision prevents him from being tried on the same charges a third time. The Montgomery County district attorney's office filed a certiorari petition asking the U.S. Supreme Court to hear the case, but on March 7, 2022, the petition was denied, making the decision of the state supreme court final.

== Civil lawsuits against Cosby ==
As of November 13, 2015, there were nine lawsuits pending against Cosby. Huth and Goins were both suing the actor for damages related to their alleged sexual assaults. Although the statute of limitations expired for most other accusers to sue directly for alleged assault, multiple accusers filed defamation lawsuits claiming that Cosby called them liars throughout 2014. Dickinson, Hill, Ruehli, and McKee have filed individual lawsuits. Green, Serignese, Traitz, Bowman, Tarshis, Moritz, and Leslie are also involved in a combined lawsuit against Cosby. Most active lawsuits are currently on hold awaiting the outcome of his criminal trial. Some are still allowed to file motions and depose witnesses, with the exception of Cosby himself. Most judges have indicated that a civil trial will not take place until after the criminal trial.

In 2005, Constand sued Cosby. The parties settled the case on confidential terms in 2006. In July 2015, after portions of the sealed deposition were released, Cosby released a statement saying the "only reason" why he settled "was because it would have been embarrassing in those days to put all those women on the stand, and his family had no clue." During summer 2015, both Cosby's legal team and Constand's lawyer Troiani filed motions accusing the other party of having broken the confidentiality agreement that was part of the 2006 settlement. The primary issue alleged by Cosby was that a court reporter released the full transcript of his deposition, blaming Troiani for this act and seeking sanctions against Troiani. A federal judge had unsealed portions of the evidence from the 2005 lawsuit, but that did not include Cosby's statements made under oath.

The significance of the availability of the deposition is that it contains admissions made by Cosby about his tactics in dealing with other women, including the use of "powerful sedatives [including Quaaludes] in a calculated pursuit of young women", according to a New York Times summary. The transcript of the full testimony was obtained by the Times from a court reporting service, where it was publicly available. The significance of the availability of Cosby's deposition from the Constand case is that plaintiffs in other cases against Cosby, such as the Green, et al. defamation suit, might be allowed by judges to use the transcript's contents as evidence now that its contents are widely known in the public.

Thirty-three of the accusers were represented by Allred. One accuser, Dickinson, was represented by Allred's daughter, Lisa Bloom. On December 11, 2015, Allred stated in an interview with Philadelphia magazine that more alleged victims would be coming forward. She said, "More women have contacted me who have not yet spoken out publicly, some of whom may do so in the future and some of whom have chosen not to do so. They wanted me to know the information that they had so it would be of assistance to us and our victim. There are definitely more women who wish to speak out in the future who allege that they are victims of Mr. Cosby."

=== Andrea Constand ===
Constand filed a civil claim in March 2005, with thirteen women as potential witnesses if the case went to court. Cosby settled out of court for an undisclosed amount in November 2006. In a July 2005 Philadelphia Daily News interview, Beth Ferrier, one of the anonymous "Jane Doe" witnesses in the Constand case, alleged that in 1984 Cosby drugged her coffee and she awoke with her clothes partially removed. After learning that charges were not pursued in the case, Green, the only publicly named woman in the prior case, came forward with allegations in February 2005 that Cosby had drugged and assaulted her in the 1970s. Cosby's lawyer said he did not know her and the events did not happen. It was revealed in 2018 that Cosby had settled with Constand for $3.4 million.

=== Tamara Green, et al. ===
Green filed a lawsuit against Cosby and his representatives in December 2014, claiming that the continued denials amounted to publicly branding her as a liar, resulting in defamation of character. Green's lawsuit was filed in Cosby's home state of Massachusetts. In January 2015, the lawsuit was amended to allow fellow accusers Traitz and Serignese to be added as co-plaintiffs. Singer had released a statement specifically targeting Traitz after she posted allegations against Cosby on Facebook in November, calling her story "ridiculous", "absurd", and "utter nonsense". No such denials were leveled explicitly at Serignese, but she claims the sweeping denials against all Cosby's accusers included her and have damaged her reputation as well.

On October 20, 2015, American International Group (AIG) filed legal papers to try to put a stay on the litigation, pending a court declaration of whether the insurance company had a duty to defend Cosby as well as pay for any actual damages won. AIG Property Casualty Company claimed that Cosby's policy did not cover the liability he is currently facing in the lawsuit—but that they have nonetheless been funding Cosby's legal defense "at a considerable cost".

On November 13, 2015, it was reported that four more women—Bowman, Tarshis, Moritz, and Leslie—joined the lawsuit as additional plaintiffs. Bowman, Tarshis, and Leslie are represented by Chicago attorney Michael Bressler. Lawyers for Cosby declined to comment. On December 14, Cosby filed a countersuit for defamation against the plaintiffs, claiming that they made "malicious, opportunistic and false and defamatory accusations of sexual misconduct against him". He also claims each defendant "knowingly published false statements and accusations". Cosby asked the court to award him unspecified damages and require public retractions from the women.

On February 19, 2016, Cosby's wife Camille was deposed by plaintiffs after unsuccessfully attempting to stop the deposition. U.S. Magistrate Judge Mark G. Mastroianni ruled that she could refuse to answer questions about private conversations with her husband. A transcript of the "extremely contentious" deposition was released in May 2016; Camille relied heavily on the marital privilege in refusing to respond to many questions. The deposition was interrupted twice as the parties called U.S. District Judge David H. Hennessy to resolve disputes. After the deposition was halted, the court ordered Camille to sit for a second deposition.

Lawyers representing the alleged victims planned to depose Quincy Jones who, as a friend and collaborator of Cosby for over fifty years, may have had information vital to the plaintiffs' case. Plaintiffs also intend to depose or subpoena documents from William Morris Endeavor, Cosby's former attorneys Singer and Schmitt, and his publicist David Brokaw.

On March 21, 2016, Judge Anita Brody granted some access to the case file of Constand's lawyer, even though she settled in a confidential agreement with Cosby in 2006. However, Brody did limit the release of the case file to materials pertaining to the seven women plaintiffs and other witnesses. On September 28, Joseph Cammarata filed a motion stating that Cosby violated rules of civil procedure. The motion asked the judge to determine that Cosby was personally responsible for defamatory statements made by his spokespeople and the publication of such materials; and that he be liable for causing the plaintiffs' emotional distress from these comments.

=== Janice Dickinson ===
Dickinson filed a similar defamation lawsuit against Cosby in May 2015 in California. According to Bloom, "Calling Dickinson a liar is a defamatory statement under the law ... and that's the mistake Bill Cosby made." Later court filings include sworn statements from friends and colleagues confirming that Dickinson provided a consistent story for many years about her alleged abuse. Pablo Fenjves, Dickinson's ghostwriter, and former ReganBooks president Judith Regan asserted that Dickinson came forward with her allegations for her 2002 autobiography, but they were not included in the book because ReganBooks' parent company HarperCollins was afraid of being sued by Cosby.

On November 2, 2015, Los Angeles Superior Court Judge Debre Katz Weintraub ruled Cosby and Singer must give depositions despite their efforts to have the case thrown out (Singer was not named as a defendant in the case). The ruling stated Dickinson's lawyers could seek answers only about whether the denials were made maliciously, and Cosby and Singer could assert attorney–client privilege and refuse to answer some questions. Singer was scheduled to be deposed November 19 in Los Angeles and Cosby on November 23 in Boston. On November 12, a California appeals court temporarily halted the order requiring them to testify. Both parties were required to provide information by the end of the month about why or why not the deposition should proceed. "We are confident that once the Court of Appeals hears full argument on the issues it will allow the deposition of Mr. Cosby and his attorney to go forward," Bloom wrote in an email. Singer announced that he was planning on "pursuing claims against Janice Dickinson and Lisa Bloom after I prevail in this action."

Dickinson later amended her complaint to name Singer as a co-defendant, alleging that after she made her allegations on CNN, he prepared four press releases denying that Cosby drugged and raped her, and calling her allegations "fabricated" and "an outrageous defamatory lie." Singer was later replaced as Cosby's counsel by Christopher Tayback of Quinn Emanuel. In February 2016, Judge Weintraub granted a motion by the defense to dismiss Singer as a defendant in the lawsuit. On March 29, Weintraub denied Cosby's motion to dismiss the case, allowing the case to proceed to a jury trial. Shortly after the ruling, Dickinson said, "I want Bill Cosby in court, I want him to stand under oath."

On November 21, 2017, in a major blow to both Cosby and Singer, a California appellate court reversed two other courts' decisions to remove Singer as a co-defendant and added him back. In its ruling, the appellate court stated that Singer and Cosby's anti-SLAPP motion was meritless. In March 2018, after a last-ditch effort to get the case against Cosby and Singer dismissed, the California Supreme Court declined to intervene and hear arguments on the case.

In July 2019, Cosby's insurer AIG settled the lawsuit for an undisclosed amount."

=== Chloe Goins ===
On October 6, 2015, Goins filed a lawsuit against Cosby. In her complaint, she alleged that Cosby assaulted her, causing her to suffer "emotional distress," "psychiatric trauma," and impairment of her education. Her lawyer Spencer Kuvin said his client's top priority was that the truth come out and Cosby be criminally prosecuted. Singer stated he would provide documentary evidence to the LAPD that established Cosby was in New York on August 9, 2008, the date of the alleged incident. Although the prosecutor's office had considered filing criminal charges, the charges were dropped because the statute of limitations had expired and a lack of sufficient evidence.

In February 2016, Goins dismissed her lawsuit without prejudice. In May 2016, she refiled the suit, adding Playboy founder Hugh Hefner as a codefendant. The judge denied Cosby's request to dismiss and set the trial for June 2018. Cosby's insurance company, American International Group Inc., settled Goins' civil suit against Cosby in April 2019.

=== Renita Hill ===
Hill claims that Cosby gave her a bit part on television, funded her college education, and pledged to assist her career, while sporadically sexually abusing her from 1983 to 1987. In October 2015, she filed suit against Cosby, Singer, and Camille Cosby, alleging defamation, false light, and intentional infliction of emotional distress. Cosby's attorneys removed the case from state to federal court and moved the court to dismiss the suit in late December 2015, arguing that Cosby's denials were opinions protected under the First Amendment. Hill's attorneys responded that Cosby's denials were published facts and hence are defamatory and not covered by First Amendment protections.

The U.S. District Court dismissed the suit "with prejudice" in January 2016, meaning the suit cannot be re-filed. Judge Arthur Schwab decided that statements made by Cosby and his attorneys were opinions protected by the First Amendment. In April 2016, Hill filed an appeal with the U.S. Court of Appeals for the Third Circuit.

=== Kristina Ruehli ===
On November 9, 2015, Ruehli filed a defamation lawsuit against Cosby for denying her claims of rape. Ruehli's allegations against Cosby date back the furthest, with claims that he assaulted her in 1965. She claimed Cosby's vehement denials leveled against the numerous accusers in 2014 constituted defamation. Her complaint states, in part, "It is one thing for an accused sexual assailant to remain silent and allow the legal process, or public opinion, to run its course, but it is quite another for him to unleash his agents to deny that he attacked the plaintiff and other women, to invite others to republish his statements, and to brand them as unreliable liars." In an account from The New York Times, Ruehli has dropped her lawsuit without prejudice as of June 24, 2016.

=== Katherine McKee ===
On December 22, 2015, McKee, a former girlfriend of late entertainer Sammy Davis Jr., sued Cosby for defamation over claims he and his attorney made about her allegation of being raped in a Detroit hotel room in the early 1970s. Judge Mastroianni dismissed the lawsuit on February 16, 2017, on the basis of the landmark 1964 Supreme Court case New York Times Co. v. Sullivan, which requires a public figure alleging defamation to show the defendant acted with malice, ruling that McKee was a limited public figure. Mckee appealed, but a federal appeals court affirmed Mastroianni's decision to dismiss the lawsuit on December 18, 2017. On October 8, 2017, McKee's appeal was again dismissed; Judge Sandra Lynch cited, "McKee took concerted steps meant to influence the public's perception of whether Cosby was, in fact, a sexual predator," thus rendering herself a public figure. In January 2018, the U.S. Court of Appeals for the First Circuit refused to rehear her case in a full court hearing. On petition to the Supreme Court, the Court declined to hear the case in February 2019, re-asserting that the New York Times Co. decision was properly applied at all levels.

=== Judith Huth ===
In December 2014, Huth filed a lawsuit alleging sexual assault in 1974 at the Playboy Mansion when she was 15 years old. It was one of two active lawsuits against Cosby directly alleging sexual assault. Even though the incident occurred more than forty years earlier, California laws allow alleged child sexual abuse victims to bring lawsuits as an adult. Cosby countersued Huth and her attorney Marc Strecker for legal fees. Cosby's attorney contended Huth and her attorney engaged in an extortion attempt before filing suit. Singer's claim was made in a notice of demurrer. He also sought sanctions against Huth and Strecker.

On August 4, 2015, a Los Angeles Superior Court judge ordered Cosby to give a sworn deposition in the lawsuit. Another judge refused to dismiss Huth's suit and required him to provide a deposition, which was held on October 9 in Boston and lasted 7.5 hours; no further details were made public. The deposition was sealed until at least December 22, 2015. Allred announced that she would be seeking to depose Cosby again.

Huth was scheduled to give her deposition for Cosby's attorneys on January 29, 2016. However, on March 30, Los Angeles Superior Court Judge Craig D. Karlan granted a temporary delay of Cosby's second deposition and any further depositions of Huth. Judge Karlan allowed both sides to continue depositions of other people. Allred said she and partner John West planned to depose other women who claim they were abused by Cosby when underage, and others. Allred was scheduled to take the deposition of Hill, who claimed Cosby sexually assaulted her when she was 16 years old, on April 8. Allred also announced that she would depose Hugh Hefner in April.

On April 14, 2016, Cosby's lawyers filed a motion to dismiss Huth's lawsuit claiming that she changed her timeline regarding her "delayed discovery" of psychological injury or illness related to the alleged abuse. On April 26, Judge Karlan refused to dismiss the majority of Huth's lawsuit; however, he did dismiss a "negligent infliction of emotional distress" claim. "The court is not, at this time, willing to dismiss plaintiff's potentially meritorious claims against defendant based upon mistakes attributable to her former counsel," Karlan wrote. Allred said "We are very happy that the Court agreed and we will continue to vigorously fight for a just result for our client." Cosby spokesperson Monique Pressley did not immediately comment on the decision.

On September 20, it was revealed that one of the thirteen prosecution witnesses in the criminal trial was alleged Cosby victim Margie Shapiro. Allred filed a motion in the Huth civil case to postpone Shapiro's deposition until after the criminal trial because she believed the defense would try to use the deposition against Shapiro to find discrepancies in the upcoming trial. Cosby attorney Angela Agrusa opposed this motion. On June 27, 2017, Judge Karlan set a trial start date for July 30, 2018.

Two months after Cosby was released from a Pennsylvania prison, the case was revived, and his lawyer said he would continue to plead the 5th. The Los Angeles Superior Court has decided that trial could tentatively occur on April 18, 2022. On March 16, Cosby's lawyers filed court papers alleging that the statute violated the constitution's ex post facto law. Two days later, Huth's and Cosby's lawyers had a heated meeting to decide the fate of the lawsuit. Defense lawyer Jennifer Bonjean said that they haven't made a decision yet but they were looking for a fair trial somewhere in May. The trial then began setting up the jury on the week of May 23 to 28, and the trial itself is expected to take two weeks to finish. Opening arguments were scheduled for June 1.

On June 7, 2022, Huth testified to a jury in the civil trial, recalling the events that happened in the Playboy Mansion. Notably, photos of a bearded Cosby posing with her date back to 1975, meaning that the incident occurred that year. A day later, Cosby denied these events, saying "I don't know Ms. Huth". He was not expected to attend the trial. On June 21, 2022, the jury ruled in favor of Huth and ordered Cosby pay $500,000 and no punitive damages.

=== Lili Bernard ===
On October 14, 2021, Actress Lili Bernard filed a lawsuit under the New Jersey two-year lookback period, which allows sexual assault victimes to sue regardless of when the offense took place. She alleged that Cosby sexually assaulted her on multiple occasions with the most serious allegation in August 1990, when she claims he lured her to the Trump Taj Mahal resort in Atlantic City with a promise to help advance her career but instead drugged and raped her. She alleged that after she woke up the next morning, Cosby threatened her and said that if she contacted the police, he would sue her for defamation and destroy her career. The lawsuit sought $225 million in damages which includes $25 million per sexual assault and another $125 million in punitive damages. Through spokesman Andrew Wyatt, Cosby vehemently denied her accusations and said he would fight the 2-year lookback window as unconstitutional.

=== Victoria Valentino ===
On June 1, 2023, former Playboy model Victoria Valentino, who alleged Cosby drugged and sexually assaulted her at his Los Angeles home in 1969, filed a sex abuse lawsuit in the Los Angeles Superior Court. The lawsuit was brought under a new California law which temporarily extended the statute of limitations. The lawsuit alleged Cosby gave Valentino and an unnamed friend each a pill while they were having dinner at a steakhouse and that Cosby then drove them to his home, where he then "engaged in forced sexual intercourse" with them.

=== Morganne Picard ===
In August 2023, court documents obtained by People revealed that singer Marganne Picard filed a lawsuit against Cosby which alleged he drugged and raped her in the late 1980s. The lawsuit alleged that Cosby "insisted and encouraged" her to drink beverages that made her feel "extremely intoxicated" on "multiple occasions" between 1987 and 1990.

=== Joan Tarshis ===
In November 2023, Joan Tarshis, who was one of Cosby's earliest accusers, filed a lawsuit against Cosby under the New York Survivors Act.

=== Nevada lawsuits ===
On January 30, 2024, Chelan Lasha, who was among the five accusers who testified in Cosby's 2018 criminal trial, filed a civil lawsuit against Cosby in the U.S. District Court in Las Vegas. She alleged that he drugged and sexually assault her at a Hilton Hotel in Las Vegas when she was 17. She also claimed she first met him when she was 15. The lawsuit was filed when a change to Nevada law repealed the statute of limitations in civil cases related to sexual assault.

Prior to Lasha's lawsuit, nine other women had filed a sexual assault lawsuit against Cosby in Nevada in June 2023.

== Related litigation ==
=== Suit against Cosby attorney ===
On November 16, 2015, it was reported that accusers Green and Bowman filed a joint lawsuit against John Schmitt, one of Bill Cosby's lawyers. In November 2014, Schmitt released a statement reading, "Over the last several weeks, decade-old, discredited allegations against Mr. Cosby have resurfaced. The fact they are being repeated does not make them true. Mr. Cosby does not intend to dignify these allegations with any comment." This statement was also posted to the front page of Cosby's official website. Green and Bowman contend that this widely circulated statement amounted to branding them as liars, resulting in emotional distress and other damages.

=== Insurance coverage dispute ===
AIG Property Casualty Company, Cosby's homeowner's insurer, tentatively agreed to pay Cosby's legal costs for the Green, et al. case in Massachusetts and Dickinson's case in California, over whether these women were defamed when Cosby's representatives denied the occurrence of sexual misconduct. But the insurer has also filed lawsuits related to both cases, seeking declaratory relief that it is not responsible.

Cosby's homeowners insurance does cover him for "personal injury", which is defined in his policy as including "bodily injury"; "shock, emotional distress, mental injury"; "invasion of privacy"; and "defamation, libel, or slander". However, the policy contains an exclusion for "sexual, physical or mental abuse", setting the stage for a potentially novel legal battle over whether a defamation claim about the denial of sexual abuse is covered.

In September 2015, Cosby filed a motion to either dismiss AIG's lawsuit or stay it. Cosby's attorneys argued that AIG was acting against Cosby's best interests, and that fighting lawsuits from both his accusers and his insurance company would drain his resources.

On October 9, 2015, AIG filed a response, calling Cosby's motion "bizarre and possibly unique in the entire history of American jurisprudence", criticizing his lawyers for citing irrelevant case law from other states, and saying that if the court sided with Cosby, it "would amount to a wholesale abandonment of this Court's jurisdiction, all for no apparent reason."

On November 13, 2015, California Federal Judge Beverly O'Connell granted Cosby's motion to dismiss in the Dickinson case and concluded that AIG had a duty to defend. In her opinion, O'Connell looked at the "arising out of" exclusion noted above and declared it ambiguous. "The Court finds that both Plaintiff's broad interpretation and Defendant's narrow interpretation of 'arising out of' are reasonable [...] The sexual misconduct exclusion could reasonably be read to require that Dickinson's claims merely relate to sexual misconduct, or that Dickinson's claims be proximately caused by the sexual misconduct", she wrote.

Since ambiguous terms are interpreted in favor of coverage, Cosby prevailed. O'Connell gave a second independent reason for finding in Cosby's favor. She concluded the Dickinson complaint contained allegations independent of sexual misconduct. "For example, allegations that Defendant 'intentionally drugged' Dickinson 'even though he knew that she had been in a rehab center for addiction a few months before' could reasonably be interpreted as independent of sexual misconduct, and therefore, within the Policies' coverage ... Similarly, the Dickinson complaint alleges that Defendant's statements contain numerous implications about Dickinson, including the implication that 'Dickinson has copied the claims made publicly by other women against Defendant' and 'the implication that Ms. Dickinson's rape disclosure is a lie and that therefore she is a liar'", she wrote. As courts impose coverage in a "mixed" action, Cosby prevailed here as well but this ruling does not apply to the Massachusetts case, where AIG and Cosby are still fighting to determine who is liable. AIG plans to appeal this ruling.

Judge Mark G. Mastroianni denied Cosby's bid to dismiss or pause the AIG suit on December 14, 2015. This judge, also responsible for the Green et al. defamation suit, denied AIG's motion to pause that case.

=== Gloria Allred vs. Cobb-Marietta Coliseum, et al. ===
On November 18, 2015, Allred announced she was suing Cobb County, Georgia, Cobb-Marietta Coliseum, and Michael Taormina for violating her First Amendment rights when she was denied entry to Cosby's stand-up comedy performance on May 2, 2015, at the Cobb Energy Performing Arts Center in Atlanta. Allred participated in a protest outside of the venue, but had also purchased a ticket to the show. Nevertheless, local police officers told her she would be arrested for trespassing if she entered the theater. Allred said Cosby's team coordinated with security and police to deny entry to individuals they had placed on a list of "agitators". Cobb-Marietta Coliseum is the name of the company that organized the show, and Taormina is its managing director. The police officers are employed by Cobb County.

"Performers should not be able to commandeer a police force (as Bill Cosby's representatives appeared to do) in order to exclude individuals from the performance because they have a different viewpoint than the performer has", Allred said. She sought a court order to prohibit what she calls the venue's "censorship policy on admissions".

On September 8, 2016, Allred reached a settlement with the defense. They agreed to pay Allred $40,000 and agreed not to block any future customers from attending public events held at the Coliseum.

=== Andrea Constand vs. Bruce Castor ===
On October 26, 2015, Andrea Constand filed a federal lawsuit against former Montgomery County District Attorney Bruce Castor for defamation. Constand is being represented by her original 2006 Constand vs Cosby attorney Dolores Troiani.

Cosby's lead criminal lawyer in Pennsylvania fought for a subpoena related to his $2,500 donation to the ex-prosecutor who said he promised Cosby he would never be charged. Lawyer Brian McMonagle co-hosted a political fundraiser for former District Attorney Bruce Castor but said it occurred months before he joined Cosby's defense team. Constand's lawyer instructed McMonagle to detail any ties between his office and Castor, including phone records and documents, and instructed Cosby to do the same. At a pretrial hearing on April 15, 2016, a judge ruled that Constand is entitled to any documents shared between Castor and Cosby's attorneys. In January 2019, the two sides reached a confidential settlement.

=== Bill Cosby vs. Beverly Johnson ===
On December 21, 2015, Cosby sued supermodel Beverly Johnson for defamation, claiming that she told a false story in a Vanity Fair article. This was the first time Cosby sued a woman who claimed assault without first being sued himself. The lawsuit accuses Johnson of lying about the incident in which she says Cosby spiked a cup of cappuccino with an unknown drug. Realizing what was happening, Johnson said she screamed and cursed at him several times before Cosby dragged her out and hailed a cab for her. (No sexual contact by Cosby was alleged in Johnson's version of the event.) Allegedly, she also repeated the story in subsequent interviews and her memoirs, released on August 25, 2015.

Cosby's lawsuit seeks unspecified damages and an injunction preventing the model from repeating her claims and requests they be removed from Johnson's memoir.

On February 19, 2016, Cosby filed a motion to dismiss his lawsuit against Johnson. His attorney Monique Pressley wrote in an email that Cosby decided to focus on his defense in a Pennsylvania criminal case and plans to refile the case before the statute of limitations expires. No such refiling occurred.

=== Bill Cosby vs. Andrea Constand, Constand's mother, Constand's attorneys and National Enquirer ===
On February 1, 2016, Cosby filed a breach of contract lawsuit against Andrea Constand, her mother Gianna Constand, her current lawyer Dolores Troiani, her former lawyer Bebe Kivitz, and the publisher of the National Enquirer, a day before the February 2 criminal court hearing that included testimony from Troiani. The lawsuit seeks full repayment plus interest on "the substantial financial benefit". The filing states "Despite being expressly prohibited from disclosing such information to anyone, Andrea Constand volunteered to participate and disclosed such information to the district attorney and others." Troiani has maintained that the settlement agreement barred Constand only from initiating criminal proceedings against Cosby and not from cooperating if authorities approached her first. Prosecutors introduced a copy of the agreement, redacted but for one sentence, at Cosby's pretrial hearing this month. That line read: "Constand agrees that she will not initiate any criminal complaint against Cosby arising from the underlying facts of this case." The lawsuit currently remains under seal and Cosby's lawyers declined to comment on it.

On July 28, 2016, Cosby filed a motion to dismiss his lawsuit against all defendants.

=== Bruce Castor vs. Andrea Constand ===
On October 20, 2017, Bruce Castor's attorney, James Beasley Jr., announced that he planned to file a lawsuit against Andrea Constand for damages suffered as a result of the election he lost to Kevin Steele, who is now prosecuting Cosby for the same acts Castor would not prosecute him for. He claims Constand conspired with Steele to help him win the election so Cosby could be prosecuted. Constand's attorney, Jeffrey McCarron, responded by saying "If his described basis is the reason for the lawsuit, then we do not expect it will last very long."

== Reactions ==
=== Defenses of Cosby ===
In 2014, Camille Cosby, who married Cosby in 1964 when she was 19, released a statement supporting her husband, describing him as a victim of unvetted accusations: "The man I met, and fell in love with, and whom I continue to love, is the man you all knew through his work. He is a kind man ... and a wonderful husband, father and friend."

In a January 2015 Time magazine article about why black women should stop defending Cosby, actress Phylicia Rashad is quoted defending him: "What you're seeing is the destruction of a legacy. And I think it's orchestrated. I don't know why or who's doing it, but it's the legacy. And it's a legacy that is so important to the culture."

In a July 2015 USA Today article about how the actors of The Cosby Show responded to the allegations, Keshia Knight Pulliam of the cast stated "All I can speak to is the man I know and I love the fact that he has been such an example [and] you can't take away from the great that he has done, the millions and millions of dollars he has given back to colleges and education, and just what he did with the Cosby Show and how groundbreaking that was. The Cosbys, we were the first family that no matter what race, religion, you saw yourself in." "At the end of the day they are allegations ... I don't have that story to tell."

In September 2015, comedian Damon Wayans attacked the accusers, calling them "un-rape-able", and defended Cosby by stating "It's a money hustle."

In December 2015, actor and comedian Eddie Griffin suggested that Cosby was the victim of a conspiracy to destroy his image and that several other prominent African-American men were victims of similar conspiracies.

Chicago Tribune columnist Clarence Page writes that the most popular conspiracy theory regarding the allegations involves Cosby being "[punished] by the powers-that-be for [his] attempts to buy NBC in the 1990s". Page wrote that the conspiracy does not explain why the conspirators waited so long to make their accusations, with the scandal unfolding many years after Cosby abandoned the purchase. Dick Gregory was a supporter of this theory.

==== Defenders change their minds ====
Two notable people who previously defended Cosby and believed in his innocence, changed their minds. American actress and talk show host Whoopi Goldberg and Joseph C. Phillips (a Cosby Show regular for three years) each made public statements on July 15, 2015. Goldberg said "If this is to be tried in the court of public opinion, I got to say all of the information that's out there kind of points to guilt." In an interview, Goldberg had a message for Cosby: "It looks bad, Bill. Either speak up or shut up." Goldberg had received threats for staunchly standing by Cosby. Goldberg, in the form of a question, referred to Cosby as a "serial rapist" and questioned why he was still on the streets. Phillips was more direct in a separate comment from Goldberg, saying "Of course Bill Cosby is guilty!"

=== Obama reaction ===
In July 2015, PAVE: Promoting Awareness and Victim Empowerment, a nonprofit group focusing on sexual assault prevention, launched a WhiteHouse.gov petition, calling upon President Barack Obama to revoke Cosby's Presidential Medal of Freedom (which Cosby received from President George W. Bush in July 2002). Later the same month, in response to a question at a news conference, President Obama said:

There's no precedent for revoking a medal. We don't have that mechanism. And, as you know, I tend to make it a policy not to comment on the specifics of cases where there might still be, if not criminal, then civil, issues involved. [long pause] I'll say this, if you give a woman, or a man for that matter, without his or her knowledge, a drug, and then have sex with that person without consent, that's rape. And I think this country, any civilized country, should have no tolerance for rape.

=== Cosby's response ===
After Tamara Green, a witness in Andrea Constand's case, re-told her story to Newsweek in February 2014, Cosby's publicist David Brokaw issued a statement calling it a "10-year discredited accusation that proved to be nothing at the time, and is still nothing." When the sexual assault claims against Cosby exploded at the end of 2014, denials by Brokaw and other Cosby representatives became even more vehement, with lawyer Martin Singer calling all the allegations "unsubstantiated, fantastical stories ... [that] have escalated past the point of absurdity".

When Dickinson came forward in November 2014 to accuse Cosby of raping her in 1982, Singer issued a denial on behalf of Cosby, saying, "Janice Dickinson's story accusing Bill Cosby of rape is a lie."

Around the time of these interviews, Cosby's lawyers began sending sharply worded letters to publications that wrote about the sexual assault allegations, threatening legal action and using phrases like "proceed at your own peril" if they published certain stories. News outlets published the threatening letters from Cosby's attorneys.

In November 2014, one of Cosby's lawyers, John Schmitt, released a statement reading, "Over the last several weeks, decade-old, discredited allegations against Mr. Cosby have resurfaced. The fact they are being repeated does not make them true. Mr. Cosby does not intend to dignify these allegations with any comment." This statement was also posted to the front page of Cosby's official website.

Subsequent to his arraignment on three felony charges based on the Constand case, Cosby tweeted the following message on December 30, 2015: "Friends and fans, Thank You [sic]."

==== Interviews ====
Cosby was asked directly about Buress's comments and the resulting fallout in two November 2014 interviews, which were originally intended to be about a new art exhibit at the Smithsonian featuring his private collection of African American art. In an NPR interview on November 15, reporter Scott Simon said: "This question gives me no pleasure, Mr. Cosby, but there have been serious allegations raised about you in recent days." Cosby became silent, leading to an awkward radio exchange in which Simon verbally described Cosby's actions to listeners: "you're shaking your head no." Simon continued asking Cosby to comment on the allegations before finally wrapping up the interview with no further communication from Cosby. In a November 6 interview with Associated Press reporter Brett Zongker, Cosby appeared visibly rattled by unexpected Buress questions and told Zongker, "No, no, we don't answer that." In the following recorded minutes, Cosby repeatedly attempted to get Zongker to confirm that the AP would edit out the Buress questions, implying that Zongker's "integrity" and ability to be a "serious reporter" would be compromised if that portion of the interview was not "scuttled". When Zongker did not guarantee this request, Cosby turned to his off-camera publicist David Brokaw and told him to get on the phone with Zongker's editors "immediately". When the interview was first released on November 10, the Buress questions were omitted. However, after the allegations continued to gain new traction, including a new accusation from Janice Dickinson, the AP released footage of the full exchange on November 19.

In a November 21, 2014, Florida Today interview, Cosby stated: "I know people are tired of me not saying anything, but a guy doesn't have to answer to innuendos. People should fact check. People shouldn't have to go through that and shouldn't answer to innuendos."

== Fallout ==
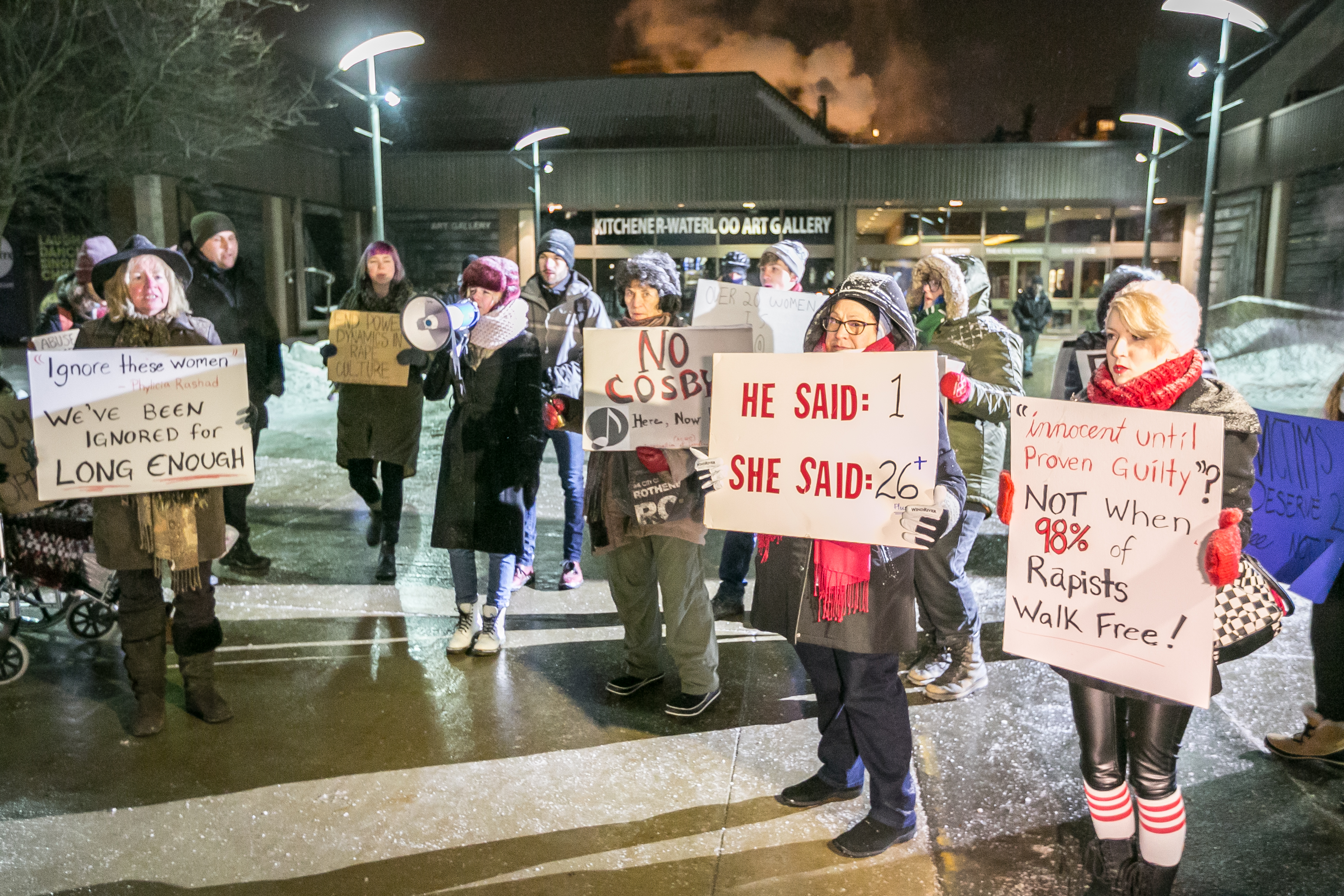
Demonstrators protesting against Cosby in Kitchener, Ontario, Canada

Numerous institutions, colleges, universities, businesses, and broadcast networks severed ties with Cosby as a result of the allegations.

Cosby's honorary degrees were the subject of controversy. It is estimated that he received more than 60 honorary degrees between 1985 and 2014, many of which were conferred after Cosby admitted to funneling money to mistress Shawn Upshaw in the 1990s, was accused of sexually assaulting Lachele Covington in 2000, and faced a sexual abuse lawsuit in 2005 by Andrea Constand with thirteen other alleged victims prepared to come forward. Nevertheless, Cosby continued to collect honorary degrees, up until Boston University granted him one in May 2014. The University of Arizona was still in discussions as late as November 2014 to award a degree to Cosby in 2015.

However, as the Cosby controversy unfolded, there was an increasing movement to draw attention to sexual violence on college campuses, with growing criticism that the bureaucracy of higher education led to a culture where sexual crimes were not taken seriously. New York magazine referred to the movement in 2014 as a "revolution against campus sexual assault". It became so prevalent that Vice President Joe Biden released an op-ed in 2015 to combat the issue. It was against this backdrop that numerous colleges and universities began to sever their ties with Cosby, with an unprecedented number of them rescinding his honorary degrees.

When announcing their condemnation of Cosby, many universities used the opportunity to voice strong no-tolerance policies of sexual violence of any kind. Brown University said Cosby's alleged actions were "particularly troubling as our university community continues to confront the very real challenges of sexual violence on our campus and in society at large." In Baylor University's statement announcing Cosby's rescinded degree, it added, "Through the efforts of our Title IX Office, we are encouraging victims to report acts of interpersonal and sexual violence, and making sure those suffering from the effects of such acts are provided the necessary support and services to feel safe and be academically successful."

After more than 20 institutions rescinded Cosby's degrees, several others refused to do so, often citing their policy not to rescind any degree for any reason. These schools nevertheless included statements abhorring Cosby's conduct.

University of Pennsylvania received some of the strongest backlash when it announced it would not rescind Cosby's honorary degree because of university policy. It made no comment to the fact that Penn previously rescinded two other honorary degrees. Philadelphia magazine published an op-ed titled "Penn, Are You Serious About Not Revoking Bill Cosby's Honorary Degree?" summarizing "On a campus where 27 percent of women report being sexually assaulted, the hesitation is unacceptable." University of Pennsylvania eventually rescinded Cosby's honorary degree in February 2018.

=== Institutions sever ties ===
In November 2014, colleges and universities with ties to Cosby began removing their affiliations with him. The University of Massachusetts Amherst, one of Cosby's alma maters, asked him to resign as honorary co-chairman of the university's fundraising campaign. The Berklee College of Music, which had awarded Cosby an honorary degree, terminated a scholarship it offered in his name. High Point University in North Carolina also pulled Cosby from its advisory board, and Freed–Hardeman University rescinded its invitation for Cosby to appear at an annual dinner in December.

On December 4, 2014, the United States Navy took the rare step of revoking Cosby's honorary title of chief petty officer, which he received in 2011. The Navy released a statement saying the "allegations against Mr. Cosby are very serious and are in conflict with the Navy's core values of honor, courage and commitment."

In December 2014, amid pressure to cut long-term ties with Temple University, Cosby resigned from the board of trustees.

On December 14, 2014, Spelman College indefinitely suspended its Camille Olivia Hanks Cosby Endowed Professorship, named after Cosby's wife. The college said it would restore the endowed professorship when its "original goals can again be met", but after Cosby's 2005 deposition became public in July 2015, Spelman discontinued the professorship entirely.

By the end of 2014, Creative Artists Agency dropped Cosby as a client, leaving him without a Hollywood agent.

On July 7, 2015, Walt Disney World removed a statue of Bill Cosby that was featured in the Hollywood Studios park's "Academy of Television Arts and Sciences Hall of Fame Plaza".

In mid-July 2015, after enormous public pressure to remove art work owned by Cosby, the Smithsonian's National Museum of African Art decided to post a disclaimer reminding visitors that an exhibition featuring Cosby's art collection is about the artists, not a tribute to the embattled comedian. The critically panned show, which was planned since 2012 and partly underwritten by $716,000 in tax-deductible donations to the museum by Bill and Camille Cosby (who sits on the NMAA's board), is titled "Conversations" and includes 62 works lent by the couple. It ran until January 24, 2016.

On July 20, 2015, it was announced that Cosby would no longer appear in the upcoming documentary Painted Down, about the history of African American stuntmen in film and television. Cosby is credited with helping to create the Black Stuntmen's Association in 1967. Producer Nonie Robinson claimed, "We were the last project standing behind him," but said that pulling him from the documentary was "the right thing to do in light of the recent court deposition being made public." At the same time, the Black Stuntmen's Association removed a tribute to Cosby on its website.

On July 23, 2015, Simon & Schuster confirmed to the Associated Press that it would not release a paperback version of the Cosby-approved 2014 biography Cosby: His Life and Times, which gained criticism for not addressing the then-few public sexual assault allegations against him. The publisher also pulled celebrity endorsements for the book after David Letterman and Jerry Seinfeld reportedly asked to distance themselves from the biography.

On July 23, 2015, according to the Philadelphia City Paper, a Father's Day mural depicting Cosby, Nelson Mandela, and Desmond Tutu, was scheduled for removal. It was painted over after being defaced with graffiti reading "rapist" and "dude with ludes", referencing the recently unsealed 2005 deposition in which the comedian admitted to obtaining Quaaludes to give to women with the intention of having sex with them. The Mural Arts Program was already intending to remove the mural, but rapidly accelerated the removal due to pressure.

On August 17, 2015, New York University's free 12-week film program for high school students cut all ties with Cosby. NYU had previously named the program "William H. Cosby Future Filmmakers Workshop". NYU has since removed Cosby's name from the Future Filmmakers program and deleted the web page containing program information. "The workshops will be continuing, but Cosby's name has been removed ... in light of recent events," NYU spokesperson Matt Nagel told NYU Local, in an August 28 email.

On September 2, 2015, a portrait of Cosby made from seeds sparked outrage from attendees at the Minnesota State Fair held at the Agriculture Horticulture Building in Minnesota. Artist Nick Rindo made the crop portrait of Cosby from rapeseed. He accompanied the Cosby portrait with a small card, explaining that it was made from rapeseed, but a staff member taped over the word rapeseed. Due to the outrage, it was taken down after a day of display.

On September 11, 2015, Central State University, a historically black college to which Cosby donated over $2 million, officially and permanently removed his name from the Camille O. & William H. Cosby Communications Center and renamed it the CSU Communications Center. The school had been temporarily covering Cosby's name since July while it made a final decision.

On October 7, 2015, Temple University announced that it would further distance itself from Cosby by replacing the vacated seat he resigned from in December 2014 with Temple alumnus and NBC correspondent Tamron Hall. The board was expected to vote on this on October 13, 2015. Hall was expected to take her seat in December.

On November 19, 2015, Central High School's alumni board voted to remove Cosby from its Hall of Fame. Board president Jeffrey Muldawer said the decision was made to "eliminate an issue" that was distracting from its mission. He says some board members were uncomfortable holding Cosby up as a role model for children. Muldawer says Cosby's removal does not reflect an opinion about the allegations. Cosby attended Central only for part of his freshman year. He was inducted in 1998.

On January 20, 2016, historically black college Hampton University announced the removal of Cosby from its board of trustees due to allegations of multiple sexual assaults: "For decades, Bill Cosby supported Hampton University as an institution of higher education, including serving on its board of trustees. He no longer serves on the board."

On March 31, 2016, the National Museum of African American History and Culture, announced that it would address Cosby's sexual assault allegations in its exhibit. Initially the museum said it would not, but after enormous public pressure it changed its decision. The museum, which opened September 24, included the cover of a comedy album by the Philadelphia-native Cosby and a comic book from his pioneering TV drama I Spy as part of its exhibit on black entertainers and artists.

In January 2017, Ben's Chili Bowl painted over a large mural of Bill Cosby, Barack Obama, and other celebrities. The restaurant's owners stated the makeover was unrelated to the allegations against Cosby.

Cosby and Roman Polanski were expelled from the Academy of Motion Picture Arts and Sciences "in accordance with the organization's Standards of Conduct" on May 1, 2018.

=== Rescinding of honorary degrees ===
Many academic institutions rescinded honorary degrees awarded to Cosby. Most cited Cosby's 2005 deposition. Several of these institutions had never rescinded an honorary degree before, or only once before.

Fordham University rescinded Cosby's honorary degree, a first in the university's history. Fordham said "The University has taken this extraordinary step in light of Mr. Cosby's now-public court depositions that confirm many of the allegations made against him by numerous women" and that "Mr. Cosby was willing to drug and rape women for his sexual gratification, and further damage those same women's reputations and careers to obscure his guilt, hurt not only his victims, but all women, and is beyond the pale." The next day Cosby's attorney John P. Schmitt sent a letter to Fordham University calling its statement "so irresponsible as to shock the conscience" and saying "The mischaracterization of Mr. Cosby's testimony is so egregious that one can only conclude that it was written by one either unfamiliar with the testimony or determined deliberately to misrepresent Mr. Cosby's words." Schmitt criticized the university for an apparent effort to lend "gratuitous support" to defamation suits pending against Cosby, citing what he called the school's unfounded claim that the entertainer has a "longtime strategy of denigrating the reputations of women who accused him of such actions".

Also rescinding degrees were Amherst College, Baylor University, Boston University, Brown University, Bryant University, California State University, City University of New York, Drew University, Drexel University, Franklin & Marshall College, Goucher College, Haverford College, Lehigh University, Marquette University, Muhlenberg College, Oberlin College, Occidental College, Springfield College, Swarthmore College, Tufts University, the University of Pennsylvania, the University of Pittsburgh, the University of San Francisco, Wilkes University, and Yale University.

A number of universities and educational institutions emphasized that they conferred honorary degrees on Cosby based on information known at the time of the award, and while some said they deplored recent revelations about Cosby's conduct, they lacked a policy or mechanism for revoking the honor. Other colleges refused comment, or said decisions were still pending. As of November 2015, Cosby maintained valid honorary degrees from Berklee College of Music; Boston College; Carnegie Mellon University; Colby College; Colgate University; Cooper Union; Delaware State University; Fashion Institute of Technology; George Washington University; Hampton University; Howard University; Johns Hopkins University; New York University; North Carolina A&T State University; Ohio State University; Old Dominion University; Paine College; Pepperdine University; Rensselaer Polytechnic Institute; Rust College; Sisseton Wahpeton College; Talladega College; Temple University; College of William & Mary; University of Cincinnati; University of Connecticut; University of Maryland, College Park; University of Notre Dame; University of North Carolina at Chapel Hill; University of South Carolina; University of Southern California; Virginia Commonwealth University; Wesleyan University; and West Chester University.

=== Broadcast networks cancel shows ===
On November 18, 2014, Netflix postponed a Cosby stand-up comedy special after accusations surfaced that Cosby sexually assaulted Janice Dickinson in 1982.

Reruns of The Cosby Show and other shows associated with Cosby were cancelled. On November 19, 2014, TV Land and NBC ended their relationships with Cosby: TV Land announced that it was pulling reruns from its schedule and removing clips of the show from its website, while NBC scrapped its plans to develop a brand new sitcom starring Cosby. In December 2014, the Magic Johnson-owned Aspire removed the two series I Spy and The Bill Cosby Show from its lineup. In July 2015, broadcast network Bounce TV pulled reruns, and BET's Centric (another Viacom unit) ceased airing reruns. The show still is available on Hulu Plus. Although the series returned to Bounce TV in December 2016, the series was pulled from the network again in April 2018 following Cosby's guilty verdict. Bounce TV removed Fat Albert and the Cosby Kids twice in 2015 and 2018, respectively, and is subsequently unavailable in reruns.

== Legislative changes ==
=== Ontario sex assault plan ===
In March 2015, Ontario Premier Kathleen Wynne announced a new plan titled "It's Never Okay", which includes an unprecedented $41 million budget to combat sexual violence and harassment: "The new plan was drafted in response to high-profile incidents that remain under investigation, including sexual-assault allegations against members of the University of Ottawa men's hockey team, Jian Ghomeshi, and Bill Cosby."

=== Nevada sex assault law ===
On May 26, 2015, Nevada Governor Brian Sandoval signed a bill extending the statute of limitations for criminal prosecution of rape from four years to 20 years. Lise Lotte Lublin, who accused Cosby of drugging her in 1989 in a Las Vegas, Nevada hotel, testified in support of the new law and asked Nevada Assembly Member Irene Bustamante Adams to introduce bill AB212.

=== Colorado sex assault bill ===
On September 15, 2015, Cosby accusers Beth Ferrier, Heidi Thomas, and Helen Hayes met with State Representative Rhonda Fields, 18th Judicial District Attorney George Brauchler, and others at the Capitol in Denver, Colorado to discuss lengthening the ten-year statute of limitations for sexual assault. Gloria Allred, who represents most of the nearly 60 alleged victims, spoke to the gathering via Skype: "I have been to New Jersey, and I'm not aware of any down side since they eliminated the statute (of limitations) for rape and sex assault." Brauchler said he does not want any victim denied a fair hearing because of Colorado's statute, but "I don't have a magic number." Any change must be done carefully, he said, because the more time that passes between an alleged sex assault and prosecution, the harder it is for the accused to defend themselves. Fields called the cap for sexual assault arbitrary since most states including Colorado do not have a statutory limit on murder.

On February 11, 2016, The House Judiciary Committee voted 11–0 to send the bill extending the statute of limitations from 10 to 20 years to the full House. Both Ferrier and Thomas, alleged victims of Cosby, spoke at the hearing before the decision was made the same day. The bill was cosponsored by Rep. Rhonda Fields and Sen. John Cooke.

=== Presidential Medal of Freedom bill ===
On January 5, 2016, it was discovered that U.S. Representative Paul Gosar (R-Ariz.) had been crafting a measure to revoke Cosby's Presidential Medal of Freedom since the July release of a 2005 deposition in which Cosby acknowledged using drugs on women with whom he wanted to have sexual relations. "Cosby has admitted to drugging women in order to satisfy his sexual desires, and, therefore, the Federal government should not recognize Cosby with an honor like the Presidential Medal of Freedom", the bill states. The legislation would further impose criminal penalties on anyone who publicly displays a Medal of Freedom revoked by the president, including up to a year in prison. "To continue honoring Bill Cosby with this prestigious accolade would be an affront to women nationwide, particularly those who were victims of his horrific acts", Gosar wrote in a letter to fellow lawmakers asking them to co-sponsor his bill.

=== Oregon sex assault bill ===
A bill in the Oregon Senate would create an exception to the 12-year statute of limitations for the most serious sex crimes—including rape, sodomy and child abuse—allowing prosecutors to bring charges if new concrete evidence emerges. For example, they could reopen the case if multiple victims come forward with similar allegations or if new written evidence is discovered. Senate Bill 1553 was inspired by high-profile rape cases, including the one involving Brenda Tracy, who reported being raped by four football players in Corvallis in 1998, and the one involving Cosby. Under the bill, new victims coming forward could be used as reason to reopen a case, said Aaron Knott, the legislative director for Oregon Attorney General Ellen Rosenblum. "While Bill Cosby is a celebrity, it's not unique to him", Knott told lawmakers at a committee hearing on February 8, 2016.

=== California sex assault law ===
On January 3, 2016, California State Senator Connie Leyva introduced Senate bill 813, named the "Justice for Victims Act". This bill would eliminate the ten-year statute of limitations in California for felony sexual offenses of rape, sodomy, lewd or lascivious acts, continuous sexual abuse of a child, oral copulation, and sexual penetration. The bill has support from Gloria Allred, the San Bernardino County District Attorney's Office and others.

On April 12, 2016, four alleged victims of Bill Cosby, Linda Kirkpatrick, Lili Bernard, Victoria Valentino and "Kasey" testified before the Senate committee. "I wanted them to know that the system failed us," Kirkpatrick said. Also testifying was Attorney Gloria Allred who represents 33 of Cosby's alleged victims.

On September 28, 2016, Governor Jerry Brown signed the bill into law. The law took effect January 1, 2017. It was supported by women's / LGBT rights activist Ivy Bottini and Dr. Caroline Heldman who are also involved in a campaign called #EndRapeSOL to eliminate the statute of limitations on rape in other states. Lili Bernard, Victoria Valentino and other alleged victims of Cosby have contributed to this grassroots effort.

== Impact on Cosby's legacy ==
Joan Tarshis, when interviewed by Salon, accused Cosby of raping her and compared Cosby's damaged legacy to that of O. J. Simpson, saying: "When you hear O. J. Simpson's name, you don't think 'Oh, great football player'. That doesn't come to mind first. I'm thinking it's not going to be 'Oh, great comedian'. It's going to be 'Oh, serial rapist'."

In 2015, Ebony magazine released an issue with the allegations against Cosby as the cover story, discussing the importance of The Cosby Show and if it is possible to separate Bill Cosby from Cliff Huxtable. The cover depicted a photograph of the Huxtables with a cracked frame, symbolizing the show's damaged and complicated legacy.

=== In popular culture ===
Fellow stand-up comics, including Dave Chappelle, Judd Apatow, Martin Lawrence, Jim Norton, Bill Maher, Ricky Gervais, Lisa Lampanelli, Jeff Ross and Jim Jeffries, have commented on the allegations in their stand-up. Eddie Murphy joked about Cosby's downfall and resurrected his iconic impression of him while accepting the award for the Mark Twain Prize for American Humor.

In the 2016 comedy film Neighbors 2: Sorority Rising, a character jokes "we got Cosby'd" after realizing he's been drugged. South Park, Saturday Night Live, and Family Guy also mocked Cosby for his alleged sexual misbehavior. In 2015, when pornographic actor James Deen was accused of sexual assault by multiple women, The Huffington Post referred to him as "the Bill Cosby of porn".

In late 2018, the Christmas song "Baby, It's Cold Outside" was pulled from several radio stations amid controversy that its lyrics allegedly promote sexual predation. Susan Loesser, daughter of composer Frank Loesser, blamed Bill Cosby for backlash against its lyric "say, what's in this drink?" Loesser said "Bill Cosby is ruining it for everybody [...] Ever since Cosby was accused of drugging women, I hear the date rape thing all the time [...] I think it would be good if people looked at the song in the context of the time. It was written in 1944. It was a different time."

The 2022 premiere of the 21st season of Law & Order touched on the Cosby cases, with the plot being centered around the murder of an entertainer (in this case a singer) released from prison after his conviction was overturned in a manner resembling Cosby's; like Cosby, he was accused of many counts of rape yet maintained his innocence but was shot and killed by a victim looking for revenge.

In 2022, W. Kamau Bell released the Showtime documentary We Need to Talk About Cosby, which explores Cosby's life and career up to his sexual assault cases, through conversations with comedians, journalists, and survivors. A representative for Cosby issued a statement days before the premiere, stating: "Mr. Cosby has spent more than 50 years standing with the excluded; made it possible for some to be included; standing with the disenfranchised; and standing with those women and men who were denied respectful work because of race and gender within the expanses of the entertainment industries, continues to be the target of numerous media that have, for too many years, distorted and omitted truths ... intentionally. Mr. Cosby vehemently denies all allegations waged against him. Let's talk about Bill Cosby. He wants our nation to be what it proclaims itself to be: a democracy."

== Hush money payments and cover-up ==
It has been reported that one reason many Cosby accusers did not initially come forward is that Cosby gave them money in exchange for silence. When asked in his deposition whom he wished to keep the affair from, Cosby replied "Mrs. Cosby".

In November 2014, former NBC facilities manager Frank Scotti told the New York Daily News that while working on The Cosby Show, Cosby funneled regular payments to several women via money orders that Scotti was told to purchase in his own name. Among the women identified in receipts that Scotti preserved for more than 20 years were Shawn Thompson, Cosby's admitted mistress who later accused him of fathering her child, and Angela Leslie, who claimed Cosby made unwanted sexual advances to her in the early 1990s. Scotti "suspected that [Cosby] was having sex with them". He also noted that Cosby "was covering himself by having my name on [the money orders]. It was a coverup." Scotti also claimed that Cosby regularly took aspiring models and actresses into his dressing room and instructed Scotti, "Stand outside the door and don't let anyone in." In a later interview for NBC's Today Show, Scotti said he "felt like a pimp". Cosby's lawyer Martin Singer denied Scotti's accusations and said the walker-bound 90-year-old was merely seeking "his 15 minutes of fame".

In the 2005 deposition made public in July 2015, Cosby admitted to making regular payments to Therese Serignese to reward her for good grades.
