= Trial of Bill Cosby =

2015–2022 American legal case

Commonwealth of Pennsylvania v. William H. Cosby, Jr.
- Court: Montgomery County Court of Common Pleas
- Decided: April 26, 2018
- Verdict: aggravated indecent assault
- Citations: Commonwealth v. Cosby, CP-46-CR-00008386-2015 (Montgomery County, Pennsylvania Court of Common Pleas, 2018

Case history
- Appealed to: Supreme Court of Pennsylvania

Court membership
- Judge sitting: Steven O'Neill

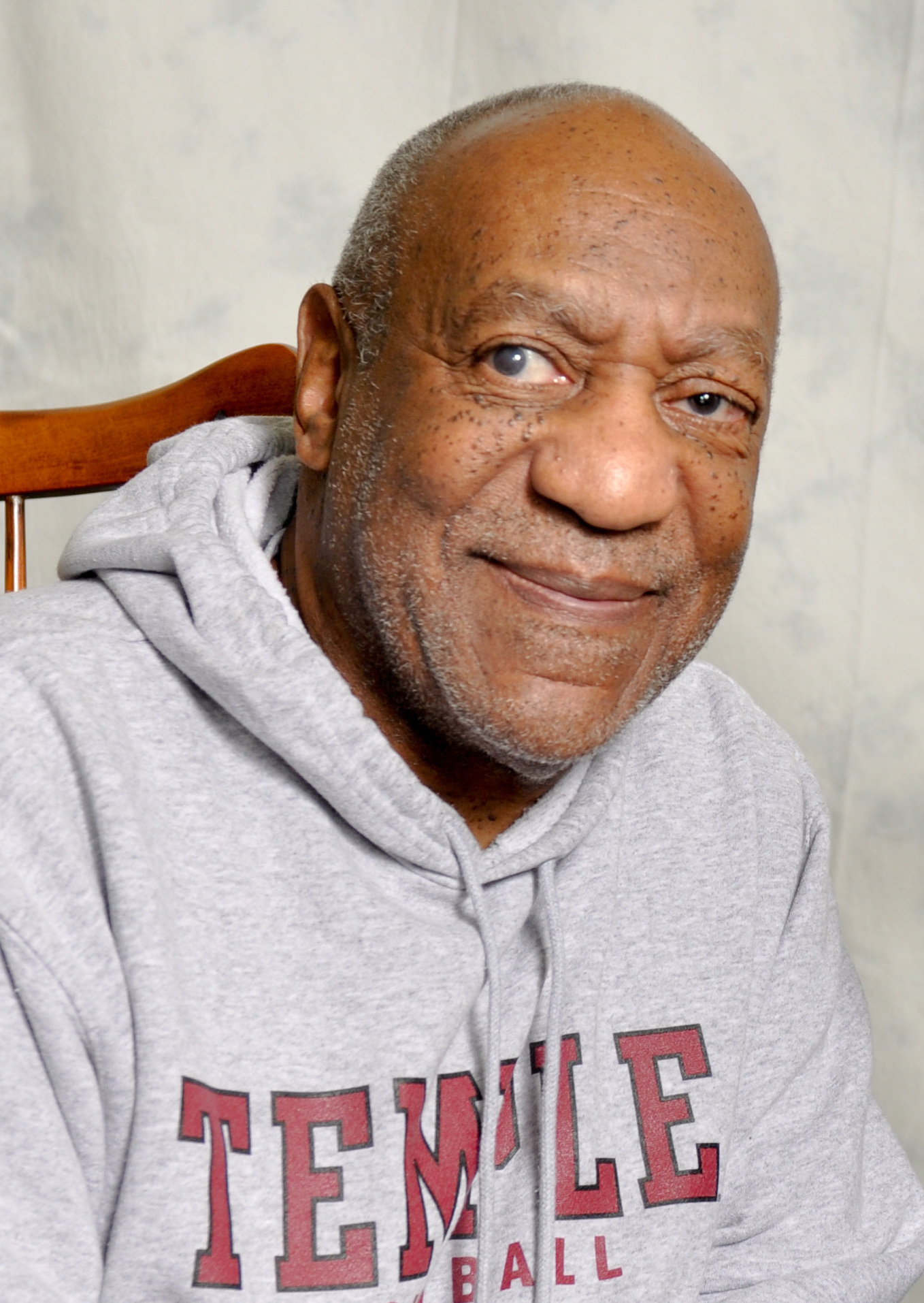
Bill Cosby in 2011

In December 2015, three Class II felony charges of aggravated indecent assault were filed against American media personality Bill Cosby in Montgomery County, Pennsylvania, based on allegations by Andrea Constand concerning incidents in January 2004. Cosby's first trial in June 2017 ended in a mistrial. Cosby was found guilty of three counts of aggravated indecent assault at retrial on April 26, 2018, and on September 25, 2018, he was sentenced to three to ten years in state prison and fined $25,000 plus the cost of the prosecution, $43,611.

Cosby appealed on June 25, 2019, and the verdict was subsequently upheld and granted an appeal by the Pennsylvania Supreme Court. On June 30, 2021, the Pennsylvania Supreme Court found that an agreement with a previous prosecutor, Bruce Castor, prevented Cosby from being charged in the case, and overruled the conviction. The Supreme Court's decision prevents him from being tried on the same charges a third time. The Montgomery County district attorney's office filed a certiorari petition asking the U.S. Supreme Court to hear the case, but on March 7, 2022, the petition was denied, making the decision of the state supreme court final.

== Background ==
Bill Cosby has been accused by over 60 women of rape, drug-facilitated sexual assault, sexual battery, child sexual abuse, and sexual harassment. The earliest incidents allegedly took place in the mid-1960s. Assault allegations against Cosby became more public after a stand-up routine by comedian Hannibal Buress in October 2014, alluding to Cosby's covert sexual misbehavior; thereafter, many additional claims were made. The dates of the alleged incidents have spanned from 1965 to 2008 in ten U.S. states and in one Canadian province. Cosby has maintained his innocence and repeatedly denied the allegations made against him. Amid the allegations, numerous organizations severed ties with Cosby and revoked honors and titles previously awarded to him. Media organizations pulled reruns of The Cosby Show and other television programs featuring Cosby from syndication. Ninety-seven colleges and universities rescinded honorary degrees.

Most of the alleged acts fall outside the statute of limitations for criminal legal proceedings, but criminal charges were filed against Cosby in one case and numerous civil lawsuits were brought against him. As of November 2015, eight related civil suits were active against him. Gloria Allred represented 33 of the alleged victims. In July 2015, some court records were unsealed and released to the public from Andrea Constand's 2005 civil suit against Cosby. The full transcript of his deposition was released to the media by a court reporting service. In his testimony, Cosby admitted to casual sex involving recreational use of the sedative-hypnotic methaqualone (Quaaludes) with a series of young women, and he acknowledged that his dispensing of the prescription drug was illegal.

== 2015 criminal charges ==
On December 30, 2015, in Montgomery County, Pennsylvania, Cosby was charged with three counts of aggravated indecent assault on Constand as a result of a single incident alleged to have occurred at his home in Cheltenham Township on an unspecified date between mid-January and mid-February 2004 (referred to by media coverage as "January 2004"), according to the very detailed arrest warrant affidavit filed on December 29, 2015. These were the first criminal charges as a result of sexual assault allegations that had been made by many women against Cosby.

Cosby was arraigned that afternoon without entering a plea; his bail was set at $1 million. Cosby surrendered his passport, posted bond, and was escorted to the Cheltenham Township police station to be booked, fingerprinted, and photographed for a mug shot. The charges are based on Constand's statement to police of unwanted sexual contact, though not intercourse, in early 2004, that had been first reported to the Durham Regional Police Service near Constand's home in southern Ontario, Canada, on January 13, 2005; the report was forwarded to authorities in Pennsylvania. On February 17, 2005, the then-district attorney, Bruce Castor, had released a statement that charges would not be brought at that time.

Constand launched a civil lawsuit against Cosby in 2005 which was settled by the defendant in July 2006, on a confidential basis. Some of the testimony from that case was unsealed in July 2015. Based on details revealed in this testimony, along with new interviews with certain witnesses, newly elected District Attorney Kevin Steele decided to file charges on December 30, 2015. The criminal court documents allege that blue pills, said to be Benadryl by Cosby, were given to Constand, who had also been drinking wine during the January 2004 incident.

Cosby's attorney issued a statement saying, "We intend to mount a vigorous defense against this unjustified charge and we expect that Mr. Cosby will be exonerated by a court of law." Cosby's attorneys filed a motion to dismiss the sexual assault charges in January 2016, stating that Castor's office had promised in 2005 that Cosby would not be prosecuted. In testimony involving Cosby's motion to dismiss the charges, Castor defended his decision not to bring charges, citing among other things Constand's year-long delay in reporting the allegations, her continued contact with Cosby, and suggestions that she and her mother might have tried to extort the TV star.

On February 3, 2016, Judge Steven O'Neill ruled "there was no basis" to dismiss the case based on Cosby's assertions. Cosby's legal team sought an appeal before the Superior Court of Pennsylvania; on April 25, 2016, the Superior Court refused to hear Cosby's appeal from the denial of his motion to dismiss the charges, lifted a temporary stay of the pre-trial hearing, and sent the case back to the original court. On April 13, 2016, Cosby filed a motion with the Superior Court to re-seal the deposition from the original Constand lawsuit. His lawyers made a similar request in federal court in Massachusetts earlier, but that motion was denied by Judge David H. Hennessy, who likened these efforts to putting the "toothpaste back in the tube" since Cosby's testimony had already been in the news for months.

At the preliminary hearing on May 24, a judge found that there was enough evidence to proceed with a trial, despite the fact that Constand did not testify, which is allowed under Pennsylvania law. He set a pre-trial hearing for September 6. Cosby appealed this decision based upon the belief his legal team had the right to cross-examine the accuser; he lost this appeal on October 12. The Pennsylvania Supreme Court announced it would review the state law in a separate case, to which Cosby's lead attorney, Brian McMonagle, said he would try to add Cosby's case in hopes of having it thrown out. On September 6, 2016, Judge Steven O'Neill set a trial date for June 6, 2017. On April 12, 2017, the Pennsylvania Supreme Court declined to hear Cosby's appeal to question Constand before the trial.

== First trial ==
On September 6, 2016, Judge Steven T O'Neill set a trial date in the case of Commonwealth of Pennsylvania vs. William H. Cosby Jr., in which Cosby would be tried for three counts of aggravated indecent assault against Constand. O'Neill set a trial date of June 5, 2017. The judge ruled because Cosby is blind he would need special accommodations during the proceedings. On October 6, Cosby resumed his bid to have his sexual assault case thrown out, arguing that his due process rights were violated. On November 16, O'Neill denied the motion.

Cosby faced a maximum sentence of fifteen to thirty years in prison if found guilty on all three counts and a fine of up to $25,000.

=== Pretrial motions ===
==== Evidentiary motions ====
On September 6, 2016, the prosecution filed a motion to introduce thirteen other accusers to show a method of operation. Cosby opposed the motion. On February 24, 2017, O'Neill ruled that, out of the other accusers that the prosecution wanted to introduce to show a pattern of alleged criminal sexual behavior by Cosby, only one would be allowed to testify.

The prosecution also moved to introduce into evidence a recorded conversation between Constand's mother Gianna and Cosby discussing the alleged assault. The defense moved to have the deposition from Constand's 2005 civil deposition thrown out. The judge said he would rule on all these motions at a later date. On September 16, O'Neill ruled that the recorded call between Constand's mother and Cosby would be allowed to be played in court. In his ruling he said that since the call was recorded in Canada, which deems recordings lawful with consent from only one party, it would be admissible. On December 5, O'Neill ruled that the deposition in the Constand civil case and any other evidence gathered by using it would be allowed into the trial.

On March 28, 2017, Cosby's defense filed a motion stating that any mention of any other sexual offenses allegedly committed by Cosby should be excluded and that any of Cosby's admissions in his deposition about using Quaaludes or other women he had sex with should also be excluded, even though the judge ruled previously that all information in the deposition would be allowed in court. On March 30, the prosecution opposed this motion and added that comments Cosby made in television interviews with Larry King and in his 1991 book named Childhood about his quest for "Spanish Fly" showed that he was well aware of date rape drugs and that this should also be put into the trial as evidence. On April 28, O'Neill ruled that the use of "Spanish Fly" and any other material from Cosby's book Childhood would not be allowed. He did however rule that his testimony about Quaaludes would be allowed. O'Neill also ruled that the amount of money paid in Constand's lawsuit settlement would be excluded.

==== Jury selection ====
On December 30, 2016, Cosby's defense team filed a motion for a change of venue and sought a jury selection from a larger pool outside Montgomery County, arguing that any local jury pool would be tainted given negative media coverage of Cosby. On January 5, 2017, the prosecution wrote that the trial should stay in the county, but they would not object to a jury picked from outside the county. On February 27, 2017, O'Neill ruled that he would allow a jury from outside the county but the trial would remain in Montgomery County; he also ruled the jury would be sequestered. On March 13, the Pennsylvania Supreme Court issued a one-paragraph order setting Allegheny County as the county from which the jury pool would be picked. Allegheny County, which includes Pittsburgh, is the state's second most-populous county.

In March 2017, the defense asked the court to call up 2,000 people as potential jurors. They wished to mail the potential jurors a questionnaire so lawyers could winnow the field of potential jurors. The prosecution objected to Cosby's defense team's requests as to the number of jurors to be questioned, the manner in which they were to be selected, and the timeframe for jury selection, saying Cosby was trying to get special treatment. On April 11, O'Neill denied the defense motions on screening jurors and ruled that jury selection would start on May 22 in Pittsburgh, using the usual procedures of law and lasting up to a week. There would be twelve jurors and six alternates. O'Neill also denied a request by the defense to get extra strikes.

On May 24, 2017, the jury selection process was completed. The jury consisted of one black woman, one black man, six white men, four white women and six alternates.

=== Jane Doe No. 6 ===
Jane Doe No. 6 was a witness for the prosecution and was the only one of the thirteen Jane Does that O'Neil allowed to testify. She is a black woman who came forward in January 2015 under the alias "Kacey". She claimed that in 1996 Cosby gave her a drug and wine and sexually assaulted her.

=== Racial bias claims ===
In a press appearance following a hearing in September 2016, Cosby's lawyers claimed for the first time that racial bias was to blame for the sexual assault charges against their client. In response, prominent criminal defense lawyer commentators, such as Mark Geragos and Carl E. Douglas, stated that this assertion may be an effort to influence potential jurors.

The defense criticized attorney Gloria Allred, who represents several of Cosby's accusers, stating that Allred's "campaign against Mr. Cosby builds on racial bias and prejudice that can pollute the court of public opinion." Allred responded by calling the claim "desperate". She said Cosby "complains about racial bias but what about the African American women whom I represent who accuse him of sexual assault or rape and who refuse to remain silent about what they say they have suffered?" and, "This is not an issue of racial bias. Instead, it is an issue of whether or not Mr. Cosby has committed acts of gender sexual violence."

=== Declaration of mistrial ===
On June 17, 2017, O'Neill said the jurors were "hopelessly deadlocked" and declared a mistrial. Reports suggest that the jury deadlocked in a 10–2 vote in favor of convicting Cosby on counts 1 (digital penetration without consent) and 3 (drugged without knowledge or consent), and was 11–1 in favor of acquittal on count 2 (that Constand was unconscious or unaware during the alleged assault).

In an account by NBC News reporter Tracy Connor, an anonymous juror said that when the jury first told the judge it was deadlocked, on June 15, the votes on the three counts were 7–5, 5–7, and 5–6 with one abstention. Two days later, the vote on one of the counts was 10–2, but then several jurors changed their minds, making it a more even split again. It was described as a "true deadlock." On June 23, a juror told CNN that the deadlock was caused in large part by confusion over the contradicting statements made by Constand during testimony. The juror, speaking anonymously, also said the prosecution presented "no real new evidence".

The prosecution announced on the same day of the mistrial that they intended to retry the case.

== Second trial ==
Cosby's second trial was originally set for November 2017, before being delayed to April 2018.

=== Attorney changes and trial setting ===
On August 22, 2017, Judge O'Neil granted Cosby's request to change attorneys. Cosby would now be represented by Thomas Mesereau, who was the lead attorney in the 2005 acquittal at Michael Jackson's child molestation trial. Kathleen Bliss and Lane Vines would also represent Cosby. The judge also agreed to postpone the trial until at least March 2018 and accepted the new attorney's request to keep the trial local instead of a change of venue like the first trial.

=== Key motions ===
In January 2018, the prosecution asked that nineteen other alleged victims be allowed to testify to show a pattern of similar conduct, which is allowed under Pennsylvania law. The defense filed a motion to have the case dismissed, alleging that Constand did not make the phone calls when she said she did. The defense also asked that a former co-worker be allowed to testify to the fact that she said Constand had told her she could make up a story about sexual misconduct and then sue someone for it. The defense has also asked the case be dismissed on prosecutorial misconduct and claims the statute of limitations has expired as well.

=== Guilty verdict and sentence ===
On April 26, 2018, a jury found Bill Cosby guilty of three felony counts of aggravated indecent assault against Constand. The Montgomery County district attorney, Kevin Steele, asked at this point that Cosby's $1 million bail be revoked, suggesting that he owned a private plane and could flee. This prompted an angry outburst from Cosby, who shouted, "He doesn't have a plane, you asshole!"; Cosby was ultimately not ruled a flight risk.

On September 25, Cosby was sentenced to three to ten years in prison. He was also ordered to pay the cost of the prosecution against him, $43,611, as well as a $25,000 fine. On that day he was placed in the Montgomery County Correctional Facility in Eagleville, Pennsylvania, and moved to the Pennsylvania Department of Corrections SCI Phoenix in Skippack Township hours afterward.

=== Appeals ===
Cosby appealed his conviction, asserting eleven errors in the trial. He argued that the admission of the testimony of five "prior bad act" witnesses was improper, and that these witnesses' testimonies were "too remote in time" and "too dissimilar" to the charges in the trial to be admitted under the rules of evidence. However, on December 10, 2019, Cosby's conviction was upheld by a unanimous three-judge panel in the Superior Court of Pennsylvania, the state's intermediate appellate court. In a 94-page opinion, the court held that the trial court had properly admitted the testimony of five of the nineteen women sought by prosecutors, determining that their testimony suggested a "distinct, signature pattern" in Cosby's "unique sexual assault playbook." Cosby sought a further level of appeal in the Pennsylvania Supreme Court.

On June 23, 2020, the Pennsylvania Supreme Court ruled Cosby would be able to appeal his sexual assault conviction based upon questions on testimony from a witness being more prejudicial than probative. The court will hear his appeal on arguments of it were proper for five prosecution witnesses to testify in the case and include a deposition that Cosby admitted to giving quaaludes to other women in the past. The court also agreed to review whether a former prosecutor informing Cosby that he would not be prosecuted for the assault, resulting in Cosby agreeing to testify in his accuser's civil lawsuit, negatively affected the criminal trial.

The court heard Cosby's appeal on December 1, 2020.

=== Parole hearings ===
On May 28, 2021, Cosby's petition for parole was denied. The parole board said in its decision making, that Cosby would not be considered for parole until after he takes his sexually violent treatment program and develops a parole release plan. Also in their decision making, they cited the fact that Cosby was given a negative recommendation by prison officials. Cosby, through his spokesperson Andrew Wyatt, has stated that he will not ever take the sex classes as this would make him look like he was guilty. The parole board said until he takes his classes they will not have another hearing.

=== Overturned conviction ===
On June 30, 2021, the Pennsylvania Supreme Court overturned Cosby's convictions. The decision stated that, prior to testifying in the Constand case, Cosby had been reliant on an unwritten promise that district attorney Bruce Castor had made to not prosecute him. Specifically the ruling concluded that Castor's decision to announce publicly that no prosecution would take place, "was made deliberately to induce the deprivation of a fundamental right"—namely the right not to self-incriminate—thus facilitating a civil lawsuit with compelled testimony, which was believed the victim's only realistic route to justice. As with other prosecutor statements such as plea bargains, this statement was not subject to withdrawal once relied upon, even though it had not been framed as a formal declaration or offer. The court also ruled that the conviction was based on "tainted" testimony, and barred a retrial of the case.

According to the ruling, written by Justice David Wecht, Cosby's 5th Amendment and 14th Amendment rights were violated when he was tried a decade after then-DA Castor issued a press release, carried by multiple major media organizations including CNN and MSNBC, unconditionally stating Cosby would not be prosecuted, with the specific intention to allow a civil court to compel testimony from Cosby and deprive him of the Constitutional right to remain silent so as not to incriminate himself. Cosby was subsequently required to testify during a civil trial that he gave Quaaludes to women before engaging in sexual intercourse, doing so, the majority held, under the belief that he would not be prosecuted over his testimony. There was no documentary evidence that any agreement not to prosecute had been reached, but the majority held that Castor's statement was binding on any district attorney who succeeded him and that Cosby should never have been tried, so it ordered him released immediately. Cosby was promptly released that day.

The decision was not unanimous. Justice Kevin Dougherty, joined by Chief Justice Max Baer, agreed with the four-justice majority that Castor's agreement with Cosby negated the conviction but felt that since the district attorney did not have the statutory or constitutional power to make a non-prosecution agreement binding on his successors, the remedy should have been limited to the suppression of Cosby's deposition in any retrial. Justice Thomas Saylor, dissenting in full, read Castor's press release as simply a statement of what he did have the authority to do: decline prosecution at that time, with the clear implication that he reserved the right to open a prosecution in the future should circumstances change. Saylor did not find Castor's account of his decision-making credible and thus properly rejected by the trial court; he also accepted the trial court's finding that Cosby's decision to testify was not due to the unwritten agreement. He found the testimony of the non-victim witnesses to be more problematic, and would have recommended a new trial with Cosby allowed to challenge that testimony as unduly prejudicial.

District Attorney Kevin Steele said Cosby was released "on a procedural issue that is irrelevant to the facts of the crime" and that he hoped that Cosby's release would not discourage crime victims from reporting sexual assaults because "no one is above the law — including those who are rich, famous and powerful." On the other hand, several criminal defense attorneys argued that the fundamental Constitutional right to due process is more than a technicality.

==== Prosecution petition to U.S. Supreme Court ====
Five months later, at the end of November, Steele's office filed a certiorari petition with the U.S. Supreme Court to hear the case, posing the question as whether the Fourteenth Amendment's protections make a prosecutor's decision not to file charges equivalent to a permanent grant of immunity. Steele cited Justice Dougherty's concurrence as having clearly raised the issue. "The point is not that the Pennsylvania Supreme Court violated its own state laws", the petition said. "The point, rather, is that a reasonably prudent person would have been reckless to rely on a supposed guarantee that the prosecutor did not clearly convey and may not have had the power to grant." It warned that this could make many defendants, in Pennsylvania and elsewhere, who have received such prosecutorial promises claim immunity via the Due Process Clause no matter what evidence emerged against them in the future and that the Court should decide this question of first impression before that issue came to a head.

Cosby's lawyers and spokesmen derided Steele and his office for attempting this last appeal. "[T]he Montgomery County D.A. asks the United States Supreme Court to throw the Constitution out the window, as it did, to satisfy the #metoo mob" said Wyatt in his own statement in response. Cosby lawyer Jennifer Bonjean doubted the Supreme Court would take the case, and said "[i]t seems like a waste of resources and time" to persuade it to. In late January 2022, Bonjean filed a response urging the Supreme Court to decline review. On March 7, 2022, without any noted dissent, the Supreme Court denied the prosecutor's petition, making the decision of the state supreme court final.
