= R. Kelly's Karma: A Daughter's Journey =

2024 American documentary series

R. Kelly's Karma: A Daughter's Journey is a 2024 American two-part documentary series that explores the family of R. Kelly following his criminal convictions. It premiered on the streaming platform TIVI (formerly TVEI) on October 11, 2024 and was directed by Venessa Renee. It focuses on the family of singer R. Kelly, who was convicted in 2022 and 2023 on charges including racketeering, sex trafficking, and child sexual abuse material. The film features interviews with his daughter Joanne Kelly (Buku Abi) and her siblings, Jaah and Robert Kelly Jr., about the effects of their father's crimes.

== Synopsis ==
The documentary combines interviews with archival footage. In the first episode, Joanne “Buku Abi” Kelly alleges that her father sexually abused her when she was approximately eight years old. She states that she and her mother, Andrea "Drea" Kelly, reported the incident to the police, but prosecution did not proceed due to a delay in reporting.

The second episode includes interviews with Abi's siblings and their mother. Jaah Kelly discusses the public scrutiny the family has faced. Drea Kelly, who divorced R. Kelly in 2009, describes her efforts to protect her children from media attention. The documentary also shows Abi's current life as a mother and includes her statement that she will not take her son to visit R. Kelly in prison.

== Production ==
The documentary was produced by Mann Robinson Productions in association with TIVI. It was directed by Venessa Renee. Filming took place in Atlanta in 2024 and included interviews with the Kelly family, psychologists, and advocates for abuse survivors. R. Kelly was not interviewed for the film. His lawyer, Jennifer Bonjean, stated that he denies the allegations made in the documentary and that the producers did not contact him for comment.
