= List of honorary degrees awarded to Bill Cosby =

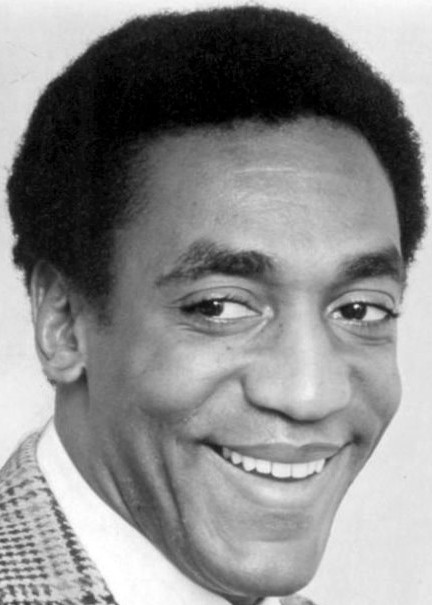
Bill Cosby in 1969

American former comedian Bill Cosby has received 72 honorary degrees in recognition of his career in acting and comedy. 62 of these have since been revoked due to his now-overturned conviction on sexual assault charges. These include (listed in order of original awarding of degree):

Location	Date	School	Degree	Status	Additional Notes
Rhode Island	1985	Brown University	Doctor of Letters (D.Litt.)	Rescinded 28 September 2015	
South Carolina	1986	University of South Carolina	Doctor of Humane Letters (DHL)	Rescinded 22 June 2018	
Georgia	1986	Spelman College	Doctorate		Spelman discontinued the William and Camille Olivia Hanks Cosby Endowed Professorship 24 July 2015
Connecticut	1987	Wesleyan University	Doctor of Humane Letters (DHL)	Rescinded 25 May 2018	
Pennsylvania	May 1987	Lehigh University	Doctor of Laws (LL.D.)	Rescinded 14 October 2015	
District of Columbia	1989	Howard University	Doctor of Laws (LL.D.)	Degree has not been rescinded as of 2024	Actress and Howard's Dean of Fine Arts from 2021–24 Phylicia Rashad tweeted in support of Cosby in 2021, but the University distanced itself from her remarks
Indiana	20 May 1990	University of Notre Dame	Doctor of Laws (LL.D.)	Rescinded 26 April 2018	
Pennsylvania	1990	University of Pennsylvania	Doctor of Laws (LL.D.)	Rescinded 1 February 2018	
Missouri	1990	University of Missouri-Columbia	Doctor of Humane Letters (DHL)	Rescinded 23 June 2017	
Mississippi	20 November 1990	Rust College	Doctorate		
Pennsylvania	1991	Temple University	Doctor of Laws (LL.D.)	Rescinded 27 April 2018	
Pennsylvania	1992	Drexel University	Doctorate	Rescinded 12 November 2015	
California	1992	California State Polytechnic University, Pomona	Doctor of Letters (D.Litt.)	Rescinded 18 November 2015	
California	1992	Occidental College	Doctorate	Rescinded 12 December 2015	
Maine	1992	Colby College	Doctor of Performing Arts	Rescinded 2 May 2018	
Maryland	Spring 1992	University of Maryland, College Park	Doctorate	Rescinded 22 June 2018	
Virginia	1993	College of William & Mary	Master of Arts (MA)	Rescinded 8 August 2018	
Rhode Island	May 1994	Bryant University	Doctorate	Rescinded 12 November 2015	
Pennsylvania	1995	Muhlenberg College	Doctor of Humane Letters (DHL)	Rescinded 23 October 2015	
Pennsylvania	1995	Swarthmore College	Doctor of Humane Letters (DHL)	Rescinded 20 November 2015	
Texas	20 May 1995	Southern Methodist University	Doctor of Arts (D.Arts)	Rescinded 31 May 2018	
New York	1 June 1995	John Jay College of Criminal Justice	Doctorate	Rescinded 23 November 2015	
Massachusetts	1996	Boston College	Doctor of Humane Letters (DHL)	Rescinded 27 April 2018	
Pennsylvania	May 1996	Lafayette College	Doctorate	Rescinded 28 April 2018	
Connecticut	18 May 1996	University of Connecticut	Doctor of Fine Arts (DFA)	Rescinded 29 June 2016	
Pennsylvania	1997	Gettysburg College	Doctorate	Rescinded 4 May 2018	
District of Columbia	1997	George Washington University	Doctor of Humanities	Rescinded 11 January 2016	
Illinois	1997	Northwestern University	Doctor of Humane Letters (DHL)	Rescinded 18 June 2018	
New York	1997	New York University	Doctor of Fine Arts (DFA)	Rescinded 21 June 2018	
California	8 May 1998	University of Southern California	Doctor of Fine Arts (DFA)	Rescinded 1 May 2018	
Virginia	9 May 1998	Old Dominion University	Doctorate		
Maryland	17 May 1998	University of Maryland Eastern Shore	Doctor of Humane Letters (DHL)	Rescinded 22 June 2018	
California	1998	Pepperdine University	Doctor of Laws (LL.D.)	Rescinded (unannounced date)	
South Carolina	May 1999	Claflin University	Doctorate	Rescinded 22 June 2018	
New York	22 May 1999	Colgate University	Doctor of Letters (D.Litt.)	Rescinded 1 October 2016	
Massachusetts	1999	Amherst College	Doctor of Humane Letters (DHL)	Rescinded 17 October 2015	
Massachusetts	2000	Tufts University	Doctor of Arts (D.Arts)	Rescinded 15 October 2015	
Pennsylvania	May 2000	Franklin & Marshall College	Doctor of Humane Letters (DHL)	Rescinded 19 October 2015	
New York	2000	Fashion Institute of Technology	Doctor of Humane Letters (DHL)	Rescinded 2 May 2018	
South Carolina	2000	Medical University of South Carolina	Doctor of Humane Letters (DHL)	Rescinded 18 May 2018	
New York	2001	Fordham University	Doctor of Fine Arts (DFA)	Rescinded 24 September 2015	
Maryland	2001	Goucher College	Doctorate	Rescinded 15 October 2015	
Ohio	2001	Ohio State University	Doctor of Education (D.Ed.)	Rescinded 6 April 2018	
Ohio	2001	University of Cincinnati	Doctor of Humane Letters (DHL)	Rescinded 8 May 2018	
Delaware	2001	Delaware State University	Doctor of Humane Letters (DHL)		
New York	12 May 2001	Rensselaer Polytechnic Institute	Doctorate	Rescinded 18 May 2018	
New Jersey	May 2002	Drew University	Doctorate	Rescinded 23 October 2015	
Massachusetts	2002	Springfield College	Doctor of Humanics	Rescinded 25 October 2015	
Pennsylvania	2002	University of Pittsburgh	Doctorate	Rescinded 13 November 2015	
Pennsylvania	May 2002	Haverford College	Doctor of Humane Letters (DHL)	Rescinded 6 February 2016	
New York	2002	Cooper Union	Doctorate	Rescinded 28 April 2018	
New York	2002	Juilliard School	Doctor of Humane Letters (DHL)	Rescinded 28 April 2018	
North Carolina	19 May 2003	University of North Carolina at Chapel Hill	Doctor of Laws (LL.D.)	Rescinded 30 May 2018	
Connecticut	26 May 2003	Yale University	Doctor of Humane Letters (DHL)	Rescinded 1 May 2018	
Georgia	2003	Paine College	Doctorate		
South Dakota	2003	Sisseton Wahpeton College	Doctorate		
Virginia	2003	Hampton University	Doctorate		
Texas	4 September 2003	Baylor University	Doctor of Humane Letters (DHL)	Rescinded 8 October 2015	
Pennsylvania	2003	West Chester University	Doctorate	Rescinded 30 April 2018	
Massachusetts	8 May 2004	Berklee College of Music	Doctor of Music (D.Mus.)	Rescinded 24 March 2016	
Maryland	2004	Johns Hopkins University	Doctor of Humane Letters (DHL)	Rescinded 26 April 2018	
Pennsylvania	May 2004	Wilkes University	Doctor of Humane Letters (DHL)	Rescinded 2 October 2015	
Pennsylvania	20 May 2007	Carnegie Mellon University	Doctor of Humane Letters (DHL)	Rescinded 26 April 2018	
North Carolina	2008	North Carolina A&T State University	Doctor of Humanities	Rescinded 27 April 2018	
Virginia	5 December 2008	Virginia Commonwealth University	Doctor of Humane Letters (DHL)	Rescinded 7 December 2018	
Ohio	1 May 2010	Oberlin College	Doctor of Humane Letters (DHL)	Rescinded 4 December 2015	
Alabama	7 May 2011	Miles College	Doctor of Humane Letters (DHL)		
California	18 May 2012	University of San Francisco	Doctor of Fine Arts (DFA)	Rescinded 25 September 2015	
Texas	5 May 2013	Paul Quinn College	Doctor of Humane Letters (DHL)		
Wisconsin	19 May 2013	Marquette University	Doctor of Letters (D.Litt.)	Rescinded 24 September 2015	
Maryland	21 May 2013	University of Baltimore	Doctor of Humane Letters (DHL)	Rescinded 22 June 2018	
Massachusetts	18 May 2014	Boston University	Doctor of Humane Letters (DHL)	Rescinded 10 December 2015	
