= Bill Cosby filmography =

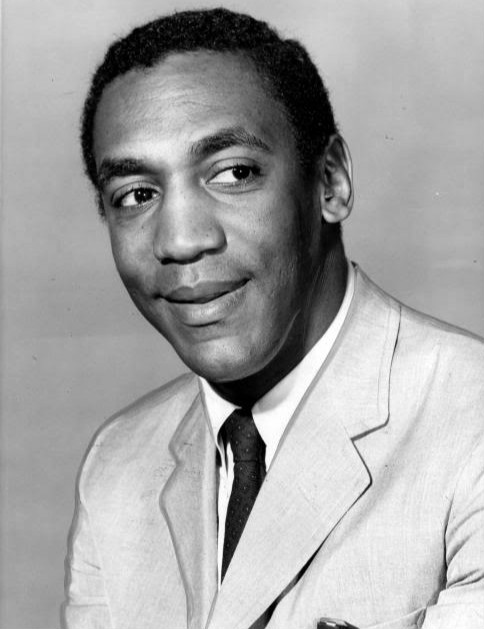
Publicity photo of Bill Cosby from the 1965 television series I Spy.

American former comedian, actor, author, director, and producer Bill Cosby performed over a period of decades in film, television, and stand-up comedy. His longest-running live-action role was that of Cliff Huxtable in the sitcom The Cosby Show (1984–1992).

Cosby began his career as a stand-up comic at the hungry i nightclub in San Francisco in 1961. Throughout the 1960s, Cosby released several standup comedy albums which consecutively earned him the Grammy Award for Best Comedy Album from 1965 to 1970. He also had a starring role in the television secret-agent show I Spy (1965–1968) opposite Robert Culp, and made history when Cosby won the Primetime Emmy Award for Outstanding Lead Actor in a Drama Series in 1966, making him the first African American to earn an Emmy Award for acting. Cosby's acting career continued as he starred in the sitcom The Bill Cosby Show, which ran for two seasons from 1969 to 1971.

In 1972, using the Fat Albert character developed during his stand-up routines, Cosby created, produced, and hosted the animated comedy television series Fat Albert and the Cosby Kids which ran until 1985, centering on a group of young friends growing up in an urban area. Throughout the 1970s Cosby starred in various films including Sidney Poitier's Uptown Saturday Night (1974), and Let's Do It Again (1975), and Neil Simon's California Suite (1978) alongside Richard Pryor. He also starred in the original cast of The Electric Company alongside Rita Moreno and Morgan Freeman from 1971 to 1973. From the 1970s to the 2000s, Cosby was a popular spokesperson in advertising, for various products including the Jell-O ice pop treats Pudding Pop.

Beginning in the 1980s, Cosby produced and starred in The Cosby Show, which was rated as the number one show in America from 1985 through 1989. The sitcom highlighted the experiences and growth of an affluent African American family, and Cosby gained a reputation as "America's Dad" for his portrayal of Cliff Huxtable on the sitcom. Cosby produced the spin-off sitcom A Different World, which aired from 1987 to 1993. His 1983 comedy film Bill Cosby: Himself was well regarded by comedians and critics, with some calling it the greatest stand up concert movie ever. Cosby also starred in The Cosby Mysteries (1994–1995), the sitcom Cosby (1996–2000) and hosted Kids Say the Darndest Things (1998–2000). He then created and produced the animated children's program Little Bill (1999–2004).

== Filmography ==
=== Film ===
Year	Title	Role	Notes
1968	Black History: Lost, Stolen, or Strayed	Himself	Documentary
1969	Bob & Carol & Ted & Alice	Patron at Nightclub	Uncredited wordless cameo. Cosby is seen very briefly (in red shirt and floppy hat) literally bumping into Robert Culp's character in a nightclub, then moving on. Cosby's screentime lasts under two seconds
1971	Man and Boy	Caleb Revers	
1972	Hickey & Boggs	Al Hickey	
1974	Uptown Saturday Night	Wardell Franklin	
1975	Let's Do It Again	Billy Foster	
1976	Mother, Jugs & Speed	'Mother' Tucker	
1977	A Piece of the Action	Dave Anderson	
1978	California Suite	Dr. Willis Panama	
1981	The Devil and Max Devlin	Barney Satin	
1983	Bill Cosby: Himself	Himself	Concert film of Cosby's stand-up act; written and directed by Cosby
1987	Leonard Part 6	Leonard Parker	Also producer and story writer
1990	Ghost Dad	Elliot Hopper	
1993	The Meteor Man	Marvin	
1996	Jack	Lawrence Woodruff	
2002	Comedian	Himself	Documentary
2003	Baadasssss!	Himself	
2004	Fat Albert	Himself	Also executive producer and writer

Sources: Turner Classic Movies and Internet Movie Database

=== Television ===
Year	Title	Role	Notes
1965–1968	I Spy	Alexander Scott	Main role (82 episodes)
1969	Hey, Hey, Hey, It's Fat Albert	Bill/Fat Albert/Dumb Donald/Mushmouth	Voice; Movie; also writer
1969–1971	The Bill Cosby Show	Chet Kincaid	Lead role (52 episodes); also executive producer
1970–1972	Sesame Street	Himself	11 episodes
1971–1973	The Electric Company	Hank	260 episodes
1971	The Fourth Bill Cosby Special, Or?	Himself	
1971	Aesop's Fables	Aesop	30-minute animated special
1972	The New Bill Cosby Show	Himself/host	
1972–1985	Fat Albert and the Cosby Kids	Bill/"Fat" Albert Jackson/Mushmouth/Brown Hornet; Himself/host	Voice; Main role (34 episodes); also the creator
1972	To All My Friends on Shore	Blue	Movie
1974	Journey Back to Oz	The Wizard of Oz	TV version
1975	Cher	Doctor	Accompanied by sweetums
1976	Cos	Himself/host	Series
1977–1990	Pinwheel	Himself	Host of the Picture Pages segment
1978	Top Secret	Aaron Strickland	Movie
1984–1992	The Cosby Show	Dr. Heathcliff "Cliff" Huxtable	Main role (197 episodes); also creator and theme music composer
1987	A Different World	Dr. Heathcliff "Cliff" Huxtable	3 episodes; also creator and theme music composer
1987	Bill Cosby: 49	Himself	Concert film of his then current stand-up act; also writer
1989	Sesame Street... 20 Years & Still Counting	Himself/host	TV special
1992–1993	You Bet Your Life	Himself/host	Game show; also theme music composer
1994–1995	The Cosby Mysteries	Guy Hanks	Lead role (18 episodes)
1994	I Spy Returns	Alexander Scott	Movie
1996–2000	Cosby	Hilton Lucas	Main role (95 episodes); also exec. producer and theme music composer
1998–2000	Kids Say the Darndest Things	Himself/host	
1999–2004	Little Bill	Himself/Captain Brainstorm (voice)	Also exec. producer, writer and theme music composer
2004	Sesame Street	Himself	Episode: 4071
2004–2005	Fatherhood		Creator and producer
2010–2012	OBKB	Himself	33 episodes; also executive producer
2013	Far From Finished	Himself	
2014	Bill Cosby: 77	Himself	Release cancelled

Sources: Internet Movie Database
