= Jennifer Bonjean =

American attorney (born c.1970)

- Born: Jennifer Ann Bonjean c. 1970 (age 55–56); Valparaiso, Indiana, US
- Education: DePaul University; Loyola University Chicago School of Law
- Occupation: Attorney
- Website: bonjeanlaw.com

Jennifer Ann Bonjean (born c. 1970) is an American defense attorney. Some of her clients have included Bill Cosby and R. Kelly.

== Biography ==
Born c. 1970 in Valparaiso, Indiana, Bonjean was a classically trained opera singer and worked at a rape crisis center in Chicago. She studied at DePaul University and Loyola University Chicago School of Law.

In 2021, she helped free Bill Cosby on his sexual assault charges. She defended him again for sexual assault in 2026, though he lost the case and was ordered to pay $19 million.

Also in 2021, she was hired by Larry Hoover to attempt to appeal his sentence under the First Step Act. The request was denied by Harry Leinenweber. Also in 2021, she represented Keith Raniere, the founder of NXIVM. He was sentenced to 120 years in prison.

Bonjean was R. Kelly's lead lawyer during his 2022 sexual abuse trial. She described Kelly as a "victim of extortion and financial exploitation", and called one of his accusers a pathological liar.

In 2023, Harvey Weinstein hired her to defend him in his sexual abuse case.

Bonjean is known for her aggressive litigation strategy. She has a "NOT GUILTY" tattoo on her arm. She is a conservative feminist, and often trash talks the jury and judge.
