= Bill Cosby in advertising =

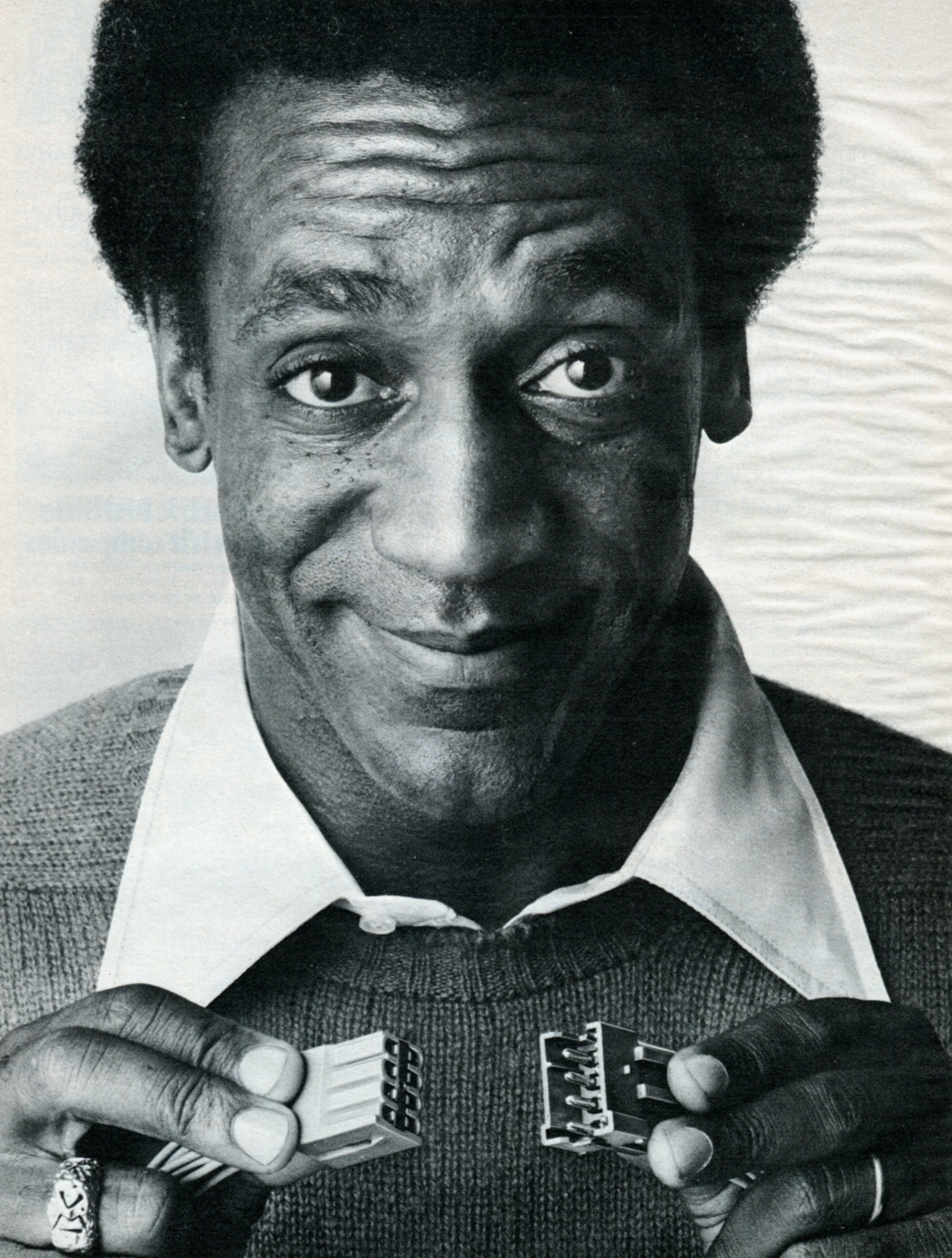
Bill Cosby in a 1976 advertisement for Ford

Bill Cosby is an American former comedian and actor, he was a popular spokesperson for advertising from the 1960s – before his first starring television role – until the early 2000s. He started with White Owl cigars, and later endorsed the Jell-O frosty ice pop treats Pudding Pop, gelatin, Del Monte, Ford Motor Company, Coca-Cola (including New Coke), American Red Cross, Texas Instruments, Service Merchandise, E. F. Hutton & Co., Kodak, and the 1990 United States census. As of 2002, Cosby held the record for being the longest-serving celebrity spokesperson for a product, through his work with Jell-O. In 2011, he won the President's Award for Contributions to Advertising from the Advertising Hall of Fame.

Cosby was one of the first black people to appear in the United States as an advertising spokesperson. He was known for his appeal to white consumers in the second half of the 20th century, in an industry seen as slow to accept diversity. In spite of making contradictory soft drink pitches and endorsing a disgraced financial company, he continued to be considered effective and believable. In the 1980s, studies found Cosby the "most familiar" and "most persuasive" spokesperson, to the point where Cosby attributed his wealth to these contracts, as opposed to his television series.

Accusations of sexual assault, rape, and other crimes were made in 2014, leading to imprisonment. Some victims noted his public persona as discouraging them from speaking earlier, with one victim calling him "Mr America, Mr Jello." Before the public scrutiny, Cosby was still one of the most trusted celebrities in the United States.

== Personality ==
First of all and lastly, I'm good—that's all—I'm good. I don't rewrite their material. I take it and I make it.

— Cosby attributing his success in the field, 1984

Anthony Tortorici, director of public relations at Coca-Cola, told Black Enterprise magazine in 1981 that the "three most believable personalities are God, Walter Cronkite, and Bill Cosby." At the peak of his advertising career in the mid-1980s, Cosby had a Q Score of 70, meaning that 70 percent of those responding to a survey of 1,000 United States residents thought highly of him, thus deeming him the most familiar and persuasive endorser. (Note: Cosby's score of 70 remains unmatched. As of 2014, actor Tom Hanks was the Q Score leader, with a score of 39.) In 2003, industry publication Advertising Age said that "during [Cosby's] 14-year reign over the ad industry's public approval index [he had only been surpassed by] the Pope. In 2012, the separate Celebrity DBI index listed Cosby as second most-trusted celebrity on a list of celebrities people pay attention to on television, behind Morgan Freeman.

Professionally, Coca-Cola advertising director John Bergin considered Cosby the company's "greatest weapon", stating that "magic happens when the camera starts." Bergin also noted, however, that he found Cosby to be "inconceivably arrogant", and mentioned "blow-ups" on the set.

Cosby biographer Linda Etkin said that Cosby "comes across as a father figure, a teacher, and a friend" in his advertisements. William Turner, in 1982 the marketing manager for Texas Instruments' consumer products group, said that Cosby "represents comfort, and people trust him". In 2014, one educator asked for comment said he remembered Cosby as a "black male authority figure, one of those people who folks that don't live on the edges of the country think of as a good black guy; they trust that guy." In 1988, a representative for Kodak said Cosby had become "synonymous with quality products and quality services". Ebony agreed, saying Cosby has the advantage of being able to be selective. Cosby said his belief in their product is an attribute, stating, "if I presented a Bill Cosby who didn't care, their sales would stop right there on the screen. Obviously, I could never do that. Once I believe in the product I aim to sell it, and that's what I think I do better than anybody".

An article in Black Enterprise said part of Cosby's mystique is "that he can endorse a number of products and still retain credibility in each individual sell". Shortly after being signed by Coca-Cola, Cosby appeared at a bottlers' convention. He refused to drink the bottle of Coke he carried on stage, saying, "I'm waiting for all the Jell-O pudding I ate to settle". Cosby said that in childhood, he experienced "periods of addiction" to Coca-Cola, consuming fifteen bottles by 2 pm.

== Career in advertising ==
=== 1960s ===
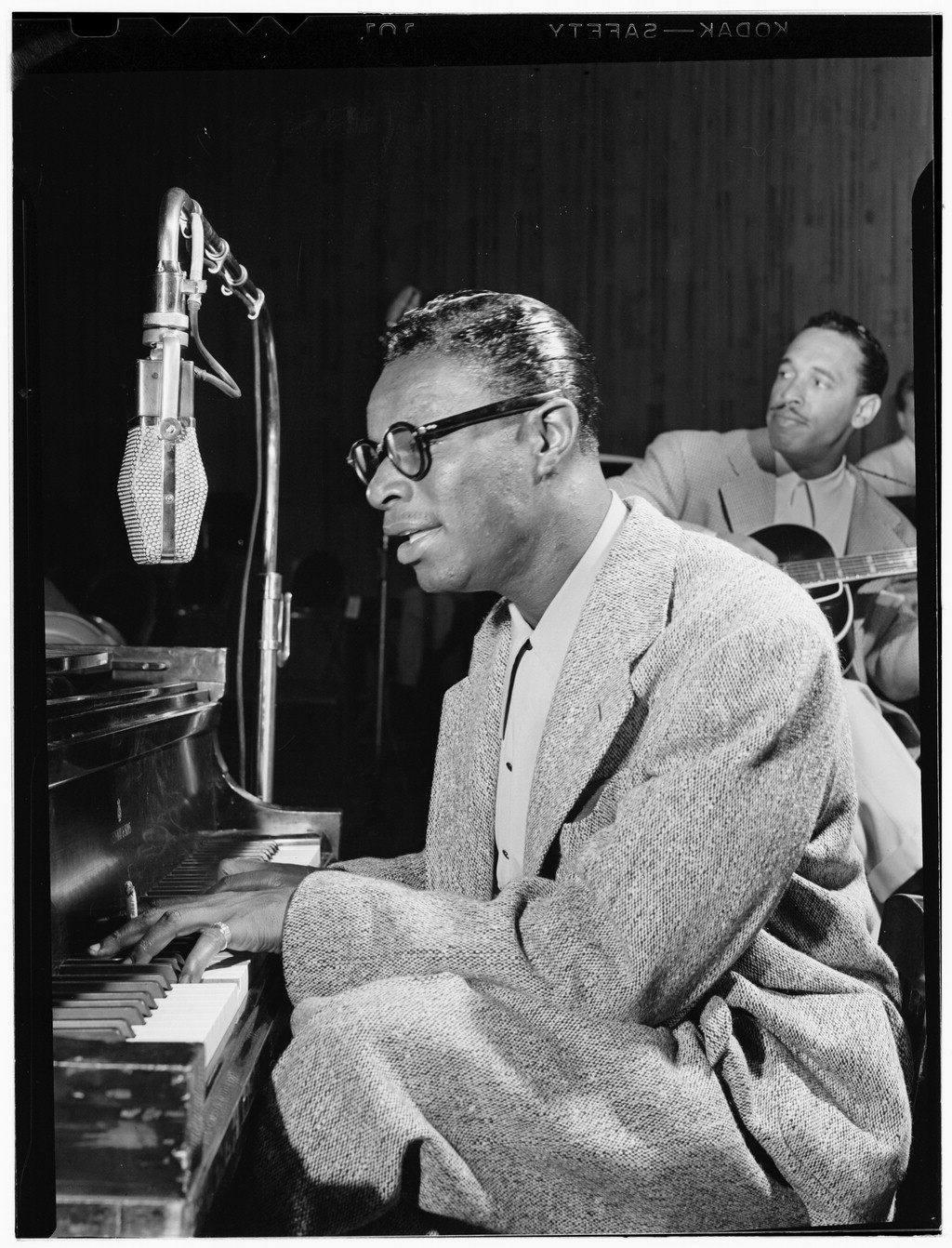
Nat King Cole plays a piano, 1946, a photo pre-dating his television series.

The American advertising industry was initially reluctant to use black spokespeople for fear of angering white customers. The Nat King Cole Show (1956-1957), the first nationally syndicated U.S. television series to be hosted by an African American, never found a national sponsor; after its cancellation Cole said, "Madison Avenue is afraid of the dark".

Cosby's first advertisement was for White Owl cigars. His agent approached them in 1965, before the debut of I Spy, but after several appearances on the late-night talk program The Tonight Show, a signifier of success in American comedy. He told agent Norman Brokaw of William Morris Agency that he liked their tagline, "We're going to get you." Cosby later said there were no commercials "with a black person holding something, buying a product, so the absence of pictures, in retrospect, said a lot". Despite the stigma among advertisers around using a black spokesperson, sales of the product rose. According to an entry in Ad Age Encyclopedia, the public acceptance of Cosby and Robert Culp appearing as equals on I Spy made it possible for advertisers to show black people and white people together in their commercials.

The Bill Cosby Radio Program, which debuted in 1968, was sponsored by The Coca-Cola Company. The series was syndicated to over 200 radio stations by McCann Erickson, Coca-Cola's advertising agency.

=== 1970s ===
In 1974, Cosby began promoting Jell-O pudding for General Foods. Cosby said comedian Jack Benny, whose program the brand sponsored, was the only previous spokesman for Jell-O, but Kate Smith, Lucille Ball, and Andy Griffith have also pitched the brand. In previous campaigns since the brand's launch in 1902, it was targeted towards parents rather than to children, a practice from which the company departed in 2001. Cosby's early commercials were created at the Young & Rubicam advertising agency by Curvin O'Reilly. The commercials did not test well in Day After Recall versus other options, making airing them questionable since it came with a $100,000 per year contract commitment. Nevertheless, lacking other options, they were put on the air supported by the brand's quite modest budget. Once the commercials were on-air, there was an immediate and surprising response in sales.

Cosby's Jell-O Pudding commercials were not permitted to be used in child directed television because celebrity endorsements were prohibited in advertising to children. Sales immediately responded to the Cosby advertising with growth after what had been a long decline.

Del Monte signed Cosby to narrate a series of commercials, in 1974, aired in 76 markets. A spokesperson for the company commented that Cosby "can communicate with kids as well as adults, one of those rare performers who can (do that) on both levels."

Cosby began appearing in ads for Ford Motor Company. To choose him, the company had 600 members of the public look at photos of possible spokespeople. They gauged recognition, "sincerity ascribed to the star," and feelings about the presenters. Ford worried about the reaction to Cosby by white customers in southern states, but he was approved of by residents of the two cities polled. Once the commercials were filmed or designed, they were tested on audiences, before airing on television and in print. At least two of the 1977 commercials were filmed at the Lima Engine Plant. One ad in the campaign saw Cosby's narration note that "the camshaft makes the valves open and close... exactly when they're supposed to." Another claimed that the engines were "tough," or "it don't get to go into a Ford car." The Federal Trade Commission decided these ads, and others, were "patently untrue," citing nearly 2 million defective cars made over five years, due to a premature wear in the engines and improper lubrication of the camshaft.

In 1979, General Foods introduced Pudding Pops, the company's first frozen dessert product. With Cosby as spokesperson, it sold US$100 million its first year. After introducing Gelatin Pops and frozen Fruit Bars, the company's frozen desserts sales reached $300 million. Cosby was engaged to promote the flagging Jell-O gelatin product line in the mid-1980s, when General Foods introduced a holdable Jell-O product called "Jigglers". Sales increased seven percent during the first year of the promotion.

My approach from the beginning has been, I want to make the program interrupt the commercial.

— Cosby to Ad Age, 1978.

Cosby appeared in commercials for Coca-Cola's 1979 campaign, "Have a Coke and a Smile," and made a guest appearance at the Great Get-Together, a major bottlers' convention held that year. This campaign continued into 1981. (Note: Coca-Cola Canada commissioned a spot titled "Coke is winning", based on A. C. Neilsen Co. of Canada statistics on purchasing trends. The April 1981 ad was pulled a month later, as it violated contracts that neither company could release their figures or mention Neilsen in their ads. Bill Cosby spots were substituted, Coca-Cola claiming this to be the second phase of their campaign, while Pepsi claimed this was a retreat.)

His work in this decade was well received. Advertising Age named Cosby the top advertising personality of 1978. In 1999, Advertising Age magazine named Cosby's 1975 Jell-O commercials, which they called "Bill Cosby with kids", the 92nd best advertising campaign of all time. (Note: The campaign was introduced by Curvin O'Reilly at Y&R; after launching such a successful campaign featuring Cosby, O'Reilly was later in charge of replacing Cosby at Coca-Cola with Max Headroom, after the unsuccessful launch of New Coke; see Messner, 2012.)

In 1979, Cosby began appearing in a series of print ads for the American Red Cross, promoting blood donation. They ran until at least 1986. In 1980, Cosby also appeared in an ad for CPR training.

=== 1980s ===
Black Enterprise magazine found that Cosby was one of only a very few African Americans who could command among the highest fees paid for advertising spokespeople. The 1981 feature also highlighted how rare it was for African Americans to be hired for a complete campaign, as opposed to a single advertisement, despite an overall increase in opportunities. Cosby's agents told the magazine he had earned at least $3 million in current advertising contracts – about one-fifth of his income – the rest of which he earned from live performances.

Cosby returned as Coca-Cola's spokesperson in its 1982 "Coke Is It" campaign, a series of commercials mocking the Pepsi Challenge. One advertisement in this series showed a Pepsi vending machine to mock the brand, which author Mark Pendergrast called "unthinkable". Another said Pepsi Challenge commercials were misleading because they never showed anyone choosing Coke. John Bergin, who directed the series of commercials, personally disliked Cosby but said his presence in Coca-Cola advertising ended the first Pepsi Challenge campaign in 1983.

Now see, if you were another cola, number 2 or number 29, you'd do taste tests and challenges and stuff and try to compare yourself to this, wouldn't you? Sure, don't shake your head, you would too, you sneaky devil.

— Cosby in a Coca-Cola ad, c. 1982.

In mid-1982, Cosby was hired by Texas Instruments to appear in television advertisements for the company's TI-99/4A home computer. He was to be paid $1 million a year for the campaign. The company touted Cosby's education and rapport with adults and children. The campaign was aimed at parents, rather than children, as was the campaign for the Commodore 64. Cosby was the face of a mystery rebate program, offering reimbursements of between $3 and $1,000; one Boston Globe writer dubbed it "the Bill Cosby rebate model." J. Fred Bucy, who was head of Texas Instruments' home computer operation in 1983, scrapped Cosby's advertisements to focus on the product's educational value. Radio Shack vice-president of marketing David Beckerman said, "A celebrity draws attention to the product. Even if we had President Reagan on our ads, we wouldn't sell any more computers. A product sells itself. A celebrity causes indirect sales." Cosby, along with entrepreneur James Bruce Llewellyn, bought stock in a Philadelphia Coca-Cola bottler in 1983 as part of the company's push to increase African American participation in the company. This was, in part, a response to pressure by Jesse Jackson's PUSH campaign. (Note: After purchasing some of the Coca-Cola Bottling Co. of New York Inc. in 1984, Julius Erving was announced as a new spokesperson for the brand.)

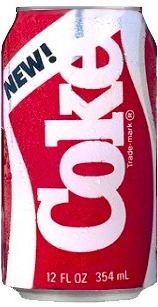
Spots with Cosby calling Pepsi too sweet were ill-advised, given the introduction of the reformulated sweeter tasting "New Coke".

At the height of the Cola Wars, marketer Sergio Zyman persuaded Coca-Cola executives to create and air commercials with Cosby praising Coke for being less sweet than Pepsi, which was aired only in areas where sales of Pepsi were dominant. One commercial from the series features Cosby "rubberfacing an icky frown" and describing Pepsi as "gooey". These advertisements were broadcast from October 1984; Coca-Cola's independently owned bottlers demanded the commercials were run in their markets as well. Zyman said despite the upcoming contradiction, the ads were the first boost to Coke's image in years. Coca-Cola was simultaneously testing possible new variations of its soft drink and decided it would sell more product if it used a sweeter formula. Once New Coke was launched, Pepsi prepared its public response to the change; among its talking points for journalists writing about New Coke was to "Ask them about those Bill Cosby ads". One of a new series of Coke advertisements showed Cosby dressed in a toga; this campaign was described as unconvincing. Coca-Cola faced a widespread public backlash, internal dissent, and ultimately the original drink recipe returned as "Coca-Cola Classic". In the days following the reversal, an editorial cartoon featured Cosby pouring a can of Pepsi into a can of Coke. Marcio Moreira, a McCann Erickson creative executive behind the New Coke introduction, said in 2011 that the decision to hire Cosby was not made until other commercials were being edited.

The Cosby Show debuted in 1984, becoming "TV's biggest hit in the 1980s" and reviving both the sitcom genre and NBC. Before the series premiere, Cosby told reporters his income from commercials for Coke and Ford, as well as his Las Vegas shows, had made him financially secure. At some point before 1985, Cosby featured in advertisements for Bird's Eye frozen foods.

In 1986, Cosby's only contract was with Jell-O, but by the end of the year he had added two more endorsements. By August, Cosby began promoting E. F. Hutton & Co. with a series of print and television advertisements, and comedy concerts. The company had been accused of fraud and needed a spokesperson who was well-liked. Soon after Cosby's commercials aired, the company merged with Morgan Stanley Smith Barney. In late December, he added J. Walter Thompson agency account Kodak Colorwatch System photographic processing system to his list. The estimated $10 million contract included commercials featuring Cosby to run in print, on television, as point of sale, and in promotional programs.

Coca-Cola purchased Columbia Pictures in 1982. In 1987, Columbia decided revenues from its spy comedy Leonard Part 6 (1987) would offset its losses on Ishtar (1987). Leading up to release, Columbia announced it would spend $12 million on "synergies" with the film, taking into account the success of Cosby's television series and record sales for his parenting book, Fatherhood. Promotions included posters, spy cameras, point of sale standees of Cosby, and a contest to win Porsche cars. Cosby, who acted in and produced the film, was initially supportive of it, but close to the release date he publicly distanced himself from it. The film failed, with a net loss of $33 million.

In the 1980s, Cosby also appeared in public service announcements. To increase black participation in the 1990 United States census, the bureau recruited Cosby, Magic Johnson, Alfre Woodard, and Miss America Debbye Turner as spokespeople.

=== 1990s to 2010s ===
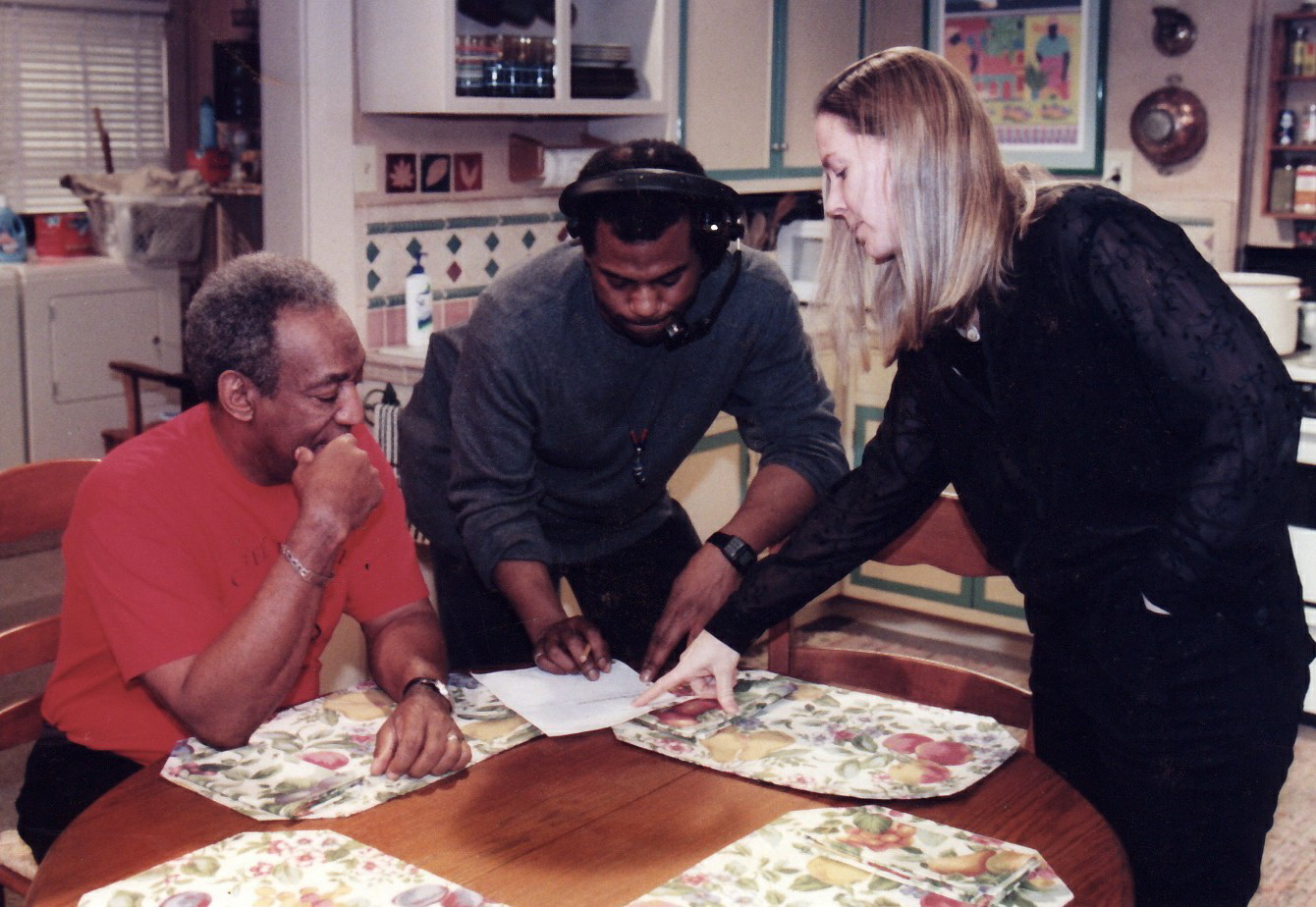
Cosby prepares to film a public service announcement for Partnership for a Drug-Free America. He is seen with a production assistant and Ginna Marston, an advertising executive who produced the spot This Is Your Brain on Drugs. Cosby also created a 1971 album titled Bill Cosby Talks to Kids About Drugs.

Cosby continued to be a Jell-O spokesman through the 1990s. He was present for the lighting of the brand's first billboard in New York's Times Square in 1998. In 1999, Cosby's 25th year as spokesman for Jell-O, was also the final year he appeared in its advertising. The company distributed 120,000 copies of his picture book series, Little Bill, into American public libraries. Despite the transitions of advertising agencies (Note: Young & Rubicam Advertising had the Jell-O account since 1926, but lost it to FCB in 2000.) and despite the 1989 merger of General Foods into Kraft, the then-newly merged company Kraft General Foods let Cosby remained with Jell-O as their spokesperson. He appeared at the Utah State Senate in 2001 to designate Jell-O the official state snack, and made a promotional visit to the Jell-O Gallery in 2004. In 2010, Cosby returned to Jell-O as executive producer for the company's "Hello Jell-O" campaign. In return, the brand sponsored his weekly web show OBKB, a children's interview series similar to Kids Say the Darndest Things. As of 2002, Cosby's time with Jell-O was considered the longest-standing celebrity endorsement in American advertising history.

In 1991, Willy T. Ribbs became the first African-American driver to compete in the Indianapolis 500. As Ribbs found it difficult to attract sponsorship, Cosby offered to appear in ads for his friend's sponsor. Boston agency Ingalls, Quinn & Johnson was believed to spend $14 million on Ribbs' team over three years, with Cosby appearing in team ads.

Service Merchandise expanded this agreement in August 1993, to their actual store. He was to appear in television, radio, and print spots, catalogues, flyers, and in-store displays. An Associated Press television columnist found it hard to believe the premise that Cosby would be shopping at the store. The ads "fell flat", according to The Wall Street Journal, which noted a $30 million price tag to the deal.

As of the early 1990s, Cosby's promotional agency was the William Morris Agency.

At the Advertising Hall of Fame induction ceremonies on March 30, 2011, Cosby was the first winner of the American Advertising Federation's President's Award for Contributions to Advertising, for special achievements in the field.

== Criticism ==
In 1973, The Village Voice writer Terry Guerin said Cosby was past his prime. Among the reasons, "making spokesman commercials for such established heels as White Owl cigars and Pan American airlines. He has evolved into a kind of self-parodying sap, the kind of flagrant, perpetual parader Sammy Davis has always been". "The Noble Cos," a 1986 satirical editorial by Edward Sorel for The Nation, was written in Cosby's imagined voice. It echoed the comments of other authors that Cosby had become out-of-touch with lower-class African Americans. In response to this sentiment, Cosby said in 1997, "So this buddy says, 'I didn't mind your commercials for Jello, Del Monte, Ford cars ... Ideal Toys, or Coca-Cola, although Coke does do business in South Africa ... But, Bill, why do commercials for those crooks at E. F. Hutton?' My buddy didn't understand my commercials improve race relations. Y'see, by showing that a black man can be just as money-hungry as a white man ... I'm proving that all men are brothers."

In 1981, Cosby told Black Enterprise magazine:

In this business, many of us are well paid but we are not all that wealthy. You may read 'X-number of dollar goes to so and so,' but remember, everybody takes a cut – the lawyer, the agent, the publicist. If a company comes along and says 'We'd like you to talk about how much you enjoy wearing this warm-up suit,' and the money is right, I'm going to do it. Jell-O was a dessert in my house when I was a kid. My mom served Del Monte fruit cocktail when I was growing up. They want to pay me to say I eat these products, well, I eat them. I came out of a lower economic area, and this is money. This is a business ... show business. A great deal of our careers depends on keeping ourselves in the public eye. I think performers should take advantage of commercial offers if they're satisfied with the product.

=== Sexual assault cases ===
In October 2014, a stand-up comedy routine by Hannibal Buress, addressing allegations of rape against Cosby, went viral on YouTube. On November 10, Cosby posted a message requesting meme images, using a hashtag of #CosbyMeme, on his Twitter feed. Many of the images posted in response related to the allegations, which were fresh in the respondents' minds. After numerous women came forward as victims of Cosby's alleged actions, a television special and a series in development were cancelled. Cosby refused to address the situation; his lawyer said such actions would dignify "decade-old, discredited" allegations. Many media outlets commented on the way such actions clashed with his image as "America's Dad". One of the accusers felt nobody would believe her claims at the time of the alleged incident, given Cosby's status in advertising. Joan Tarshis told the media that Cosby was "Mr America; Mr Jello, as I called him".

The publicity surrounding the allegations had a drastic effect on Cosby's reputation, as seen in the following drop in his ratings. In March 2013, Cosby had a 76.3 rating on the Davie-Brown Index, a rating of the public perceptions of roughly 3500 personalities published by Omnicom Group company The Marketing Arm, placing him as the third most-trusted celebrity, behind Morgan Freeman and Dr. Mehmet Oz. By November 19, this had fallen to 57.1, placing him at either the 2,626th spot or 2615th, depending on the source. The same company's separate rating on who consumers view as an "effective product spokesperson" saw Cosby drop to 2,746th spot; at one point, he had been 5th. Awareness of Cosby increased from 63rd to 51st. The Marketing Arm warns about misinterpreting the ratings fall; it said 900 celebrities were within the margin of error for Cosby's rating. At the time of the accusations, E-Poll Market Research had not updated its scores; a Q Score for Cosby was not expected until 2015. The executive vice-president of Q Scores Co. said polling in the midst of a scandal would likely overstate the score's longterm effects. All three companies' scores are updated at different intervals, meaning they are not directly comparable. Jell-O was relatively unaffected on social media by allegations against Cosby. The brand was mentioned in one percent of posts about Cosby, which was considered low. Still, negative connections continued, including by rapper Eminem in a freestyle rap, and an article by Food Drink and Franchise magazine pointed out moments in commercials that were awkward in retrospect.

The numerous accusations of rape, drug facilitated sexual assault, sexual battery, child sexual abuse, and sexual misconduct spanned from 1965 to 2008 across ten U.S. states and one Canadian province. On September 25, 2018, Cosby was sentenced to 3 to 10 years in state prison for sexual assault for an assault against Andrea Constand.

After release, a PR strategist and crisis manager told Variety that "There’s no 'Cosby' reunion. There will be no Vegas residency and there will be no new Jell-O endorsement for Mr. Cosby."

== Works cited ==
- Greising, David (1998). I'd Like the World to Buy a Coke: The Life and Leadership of Roberto Goizueta. New York, NY: Wiley. ISBN 978-0471345947.
- Oliver, Thomas (1986). The Real Coke, The Real Story. New York, NY: Random House. ISBN 0-394-55273-3.
- Pendergrast, Mark (2000). For God, Country, and Coca-Cola: The Unauthorized History of the Great American Soft Drink and the Company That Makes It. New York, NY: MacMillan Publishing Company. ISBN 0-684-19347-7.
- Milavsky, Barry (2024). Overcome AD-versity, Business Expert Press. ISBN 978-1-63742-610-4
