= OBKB =

Candid interview web series

- Genre: Comedy reality
- Directed by: Wellington Chiu
- Presented by: Bill Cosby
- Country of origin: United States
- Original language: English
- No. of seasons: 3
- No. of episodes: 38

Production
- Executive producers: William H. Cosby, Jr. and Camille O. Cosby
- Producers: Nicole Wright and Wellington Chiu
- Running time: 12–24 minutes
- Production company: Highpockets Inc.

Original release
- Release: June 12, 2009 – 2012

Related
- Kids Say the Darndest Things

OBKB is a candid web series in the vein of Kids Say the Darndest Things, where Bill Cosby interviews children across the country. The series began production in 2009, and aired for three seasons between 2010 and 2012.

== Origin of title ==
The original derivation of "OBKB" may have come from:

- Mushmouth (voiced by Cosby) communicating "OK" in Fat Albert and the Cosby Kids
- Bill Cosby's usage in his standup routine about visiting the dentist

== Premise ==
The premise of the show is that Bill Cosby would pose a question to a child (between the ages of four and ten) who would usually respond in an endearing way. Questions asked by the host dealt with bullying, learning, secret crushes, aspirations, etc.

== Production ==
Performance is in front of a live audience, but was not in a studio environment. In order to maintain the authenticity of the children's answers, it is done in auditoriums around the country. Local children are asked to participate. No scripts or coaching is used to coax children on their responses.

== Notable guest appearances ==
OBKB has had two notable guest appearances:

- Clark Terry, the world famous jazz musician, helped Bill Cosby host OBKB season three which was recorded in Pine Bluff, Arkansas.
- The Waxter Highsteppers, a senior group that does line dancing, performed on season two, which was recorded in Baltimore, Maryland.
