= Constand v. Cosby =

2005 lawsuit in Pennsylvania

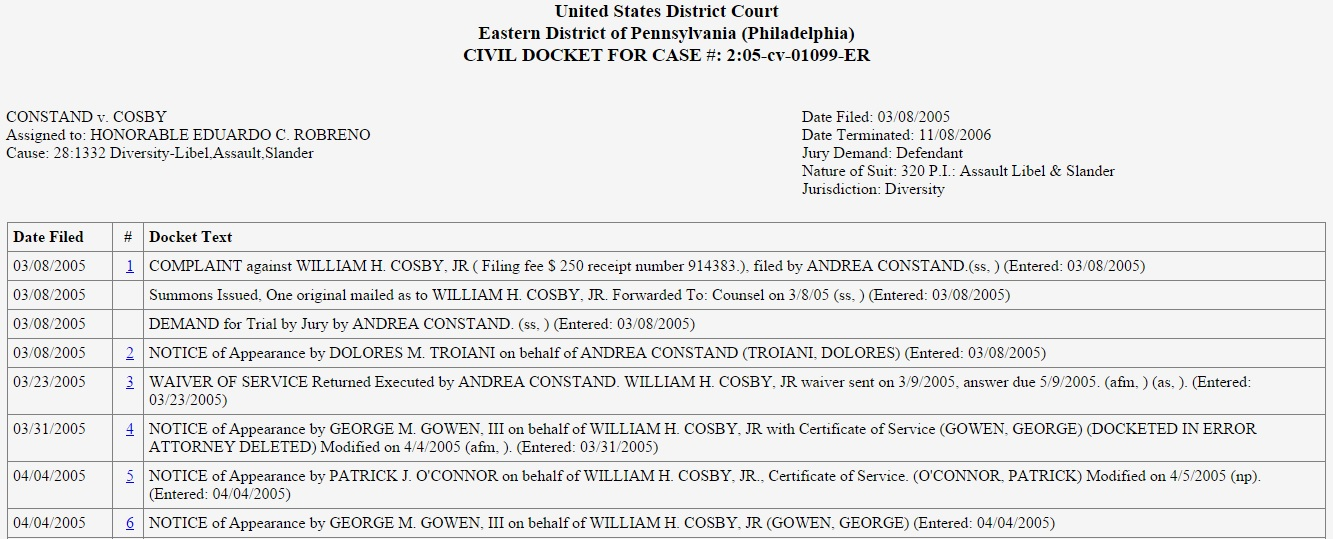
Andrea Constand v. William H. Cosby, Jr. - First six actions in Court Docket in case

Andrea Constand v. William H. Cosby, Jr. is a civil suit filed in federal court for the Eastern District of Pennsylvania in March 2005 and resolved with an undisclosed cash settlement (including a confidentiality agreement between its two parties) in November 2006. It was later revealed that the amount paid to Constand was $3.38 million. The case was filed by Andrea Constand, a former college and Canadian national team basketball player, against comedian and entertainer Bill Cosby, concerning a sexual assault that occurred in Cosby's home in January 2004 while Constand was working for Temple University women's basketball team in Philadelphia, Pennsylvania. At that time, no criminal charges were filed.

On December 30, 2015, however, Cosby was charged with three second-degree felony counts of aggravated indecent assault as a result of the accusations made by Constand about the January 2004 incident, including revelations in Cosby's 2005 deposition in the case which came to public and investigators' attention when they were unsealed by a judge in 2015.

In 2018, Cosby was found guilty of all three counts against Constand. He was subsequently sentenced to 3–10 years in state prison. On June 30, 2021, however, Cosby's convictions and sentences were vacated by the Supreme Court of Pennsylvania due to violations of his due process rights.

== Constand's background ==
Andrea Erminia Constand was born on April 11, 1973, in Toronto, and played basketball at Albert Campbell Collegiate Institute in the city. After high school, Constand earned a scholarship to play basketball at the University of Arizona. Constand averaged 10 points per game in her senior season and helped the Wildcats win the NIT, and later pursued a career as a professional basketball player in Europe. She also played for Canada at the 1997 Summer Universiade.

While back in southern Ontario, Temple University's then-new women's basketball coach, three-time Olympic gold medalist Dawn Staley, asked Constand to join her at Temple as director of operations for the women's team. In 2002, Cosby and Constand became friends in her new role; Cosby is an alumnus of Temple and maintained a close relationship with the college. Constand attended dinner parties and private dinners at Cosby's home in Elkins Park, a suburb of Philadelphia.

== Cosby accusations and lawsuits ==
In January 2004, Constand went to Cosby's house in Elkins Park, Pennsylvania, after a night out with friends. Constand stated that Cosby listened to her complaints about stress. According to Constand, Cosby gave her three blue pills he claimed would help her relax. Cosby later, in a deposition, would state that the pills were the over-the-counter antihistamine, Benadryl. They made her semiconscious and unable to move. Then, Cosby allegedly touched her breasts and crotch and put her hand on his penis. She further claimed that she woke up around 4 a.m. to find her clothing all over the room.

Constand returned to Ontario in April 2004. However, she continued to have contact with Cosby and took her parents to meet Cosby at an August 2004 show.

=== First criminal investigation ===
In January 2005, Constand filed a criminal complaint with the police against Cosby and criminal investigation was opened by the Montgomery County Detectives in Cheltenham, Pennsylvania. Constand's mother called Cosby, who apologized and offered to cover therapy costs, plus Constand's education at Temple. However, behind-the-scenes, Cosby was maintaining his innocence by saying that the sexual encounter was consensual. During the investigation, Cosby remarked that "I will not give in to people who exploit me because of my celebrity status."

During the investigation, police interviewed Cosby and Constand, calling them, "very cooperative." They also went to Cosby's home in Pennsylvania, only to find little or no evidence of a sexual interaction from a year prior. On February 22, 2005, Montgomery County District Attorney Bruce Castor issued a press release stating that he "finds insufficient, credible and admissible evidence exists upon which any charge against Mr. Cosby could be sustained beyond a reasonable doubt." The case was dropped at that time when the prosecutor decided not to proceed. The original complaint contained a great deal of additional information that became available to the press.

=== Civil case and new accusations ===
Constand filed a civil claim in March 2005, alleging both the rape, and post-rape libel by Cosby's denial of wrongdoing, with 13 women as potential witnesses if the case went to court. Cosby settled out of court for an undisclosed amount in November 2006. In a July 2005 Philadelphia Daily News interview, Beth Ferrier, one of the anonymous "Jane Doe" witnesses in the Constand case, alleged that in 1984 Cosby drugged her coffee and she awoke with her clothes askew.

After learning that charges were not pursued in the case, California lawyer Tamara Lucier Green, the only publicly named woman in the prior case, came forward with allegations in February 2005 that Cosby had drugged and assaulted her in the 1970s. Cosby's lawyer said Cosby did not know her and the events did not happen.

=== Unsealing of Cosby deposition ===
On July 8, 2015, Andrea Constand and her attorney Dolores Troiani filed a motion to negate the confidentiality agreement in the 2005 case against Cosby, claiming that Cosby had already engaged in "total abandonment of the confidentiality portions of the agreement" by way of the recent, sweeping denials of all allegations against him. The motion was filed in part with the hopes of being able to release the full transcript of Cosby's previously sealed deposition. Cosby's attorneys responded that Constand had already violated the confidentiality agreement by giving an interview to the Toronto Sun, which was published the same day as Constand's filing.

The entire deposition from 2005 was released 10 days later, causing Cosby's lawyers to file a new motion in the case on July 21, 2015, asserting that Constand and Troiani may have orchestrated the release of the deposition. In the deposition, Cosby testified that he had obtained Quaaludes from a gynecologist by the name of Leroy Amar, who knew that Cosby had no intention of taking the drugs himself. Cosby's testimony in the civil case showed a history of casual sex involving use of Quaaludes with a series of young women. Cosby admitted to knowing that, at the time, it was illegal to dispense the drug to other people. Amar would later have his medical license revoked in the states of both California and New York. The judge ruled that releasing the sealed document was justified by Cosby's role as a "public moralist" in contrast to his possible criminal private behavior. On July 18, 2015, The New York Times, having obtained the complete deposition from a court reporting service (hired by Constand) which had released the document to the public domain, published a summary and excerpts.

In a court filing condemning the release of the deposition, Cosby's attorneys stressed that none of the testimony so far unsealed by a judge stated that he engaged in non-consensual sex or gave anyone Quaaludes without their knowledge or consent: "Reading the media accounts, one would conclude that the Defendant has admitted to rape," the document said. "And yet the Defendant admitted to nothing more than being one of the many people who introduced Quaaludes into their consensual sex life in the 1970s". Cosby's lawyers further contended that a court reporting service hired by Constand had released the 2005 court transcript to the New York Times, days earlier, in a 'massive breach of protocol'. The court reporters' code of ethics prohibits the release of testimony without all parties first being contacted.

Cosby also made further accusations that Constand had violated the confidentiality agreement, referring to vague postings on her Twitter account (including one that simply contained the word "YES!").

Troiani filed a response in which she denied that she or Constand had anything to do with the unsealing of Cosby's deposition, and continued to emphasize that it was Cosby, not Constand, who first violated the confidentiality agreement. She also referred to Cosby as a "narcissist" for assuming Constand's tweets were about him. Troiani sought reimbursement of legal fees from Cosby.

The significance of the availability of Cosby's deposition from the Constand case is that plaintiffs in other cases vs. Cosby, such as the Tamara Green, et al. defamation suit, may be allowed by judges to use the contents of the transcript as evidence now that it is in the public domain.

The case was held in abeyance, pending further action in the ongoing defamation case from Tamara Green, et al., since that lawsuit was also seeking access to formerly confidential documents in the 2005 Constand case.

=== 2015 criminal investigation review ===
On September 11, 2015, it was reported that the Constand case may be reopened. Cosby admitted in the unsealed civil deposition that he digitally penetrated Constand which, if non-consensual, would be grounds for a felony charge such as aggravated indecent assault. The statute of limitations on such a charge would not run out until January 2016. Constand's original complaint only referenced misdemeanor-level offenses, which have a two-year statute of limitations. Several legal experts, including former prosecutors and at least one former deputy Attorney General, have said the case could be reopened and possibly tried in light of this and other additional evidence that had surfaced in the past year. The non-disclosure agreement reached in her 2006 settlement with Cosby would likely not bar Constand from testifying against him. Montgomery County District Attorney Risa Vetri Ferman would neither confirm nor deny whether her office was reconsidering the case that her predecessor closed a decade ago. However, she said: "I believe prosecutors have a responsibility to review past conclusions, whether their own or a predecessor's, when current information might lead to a different decision." Some speculated that Ferman would not try the case due to the risk of losing, and that the outcome may risk her chances of a Judgeship when her tenure runs out shortly after the statute of limitations on the Constand case.

On September 22, 2015, lawyer Edwin Jacobs said that Cosby's agents had contacted him in the past few days about a pending criminal investigation in Montgomery County. Jacobs, who had represented Cosby in a review of Lili Bernard's complaint in New Jersey, said he referred Cosby's agents to another high-profile Philadelphia-area lawyer who declined to comment. Montgomery County District Attorney Risa Vetri Ferman again still remained silent when asked if an investigation had been re-opened in the Andrea Constand Case. Constand's lawyer said she would cooperate in the new investigation if asked. "She's a very strong lady," lawyer Dolores Troiani said Tuesday. "She'll do whatever they request of her."

On October 27, 2015, it was confirmed, from reliable sources, that an open criminal sexual assault investigation into the Constand case had been re-opened shortly after Cosby's deposition was released to the press during the summer. And that investigators had re-interviewed Constand as well as other alleged victims and witnesses. Constand has stated that she would stop cooperating if the original Prosecutor Bruce Castor, whom she is suing for defamation, is re-elected and assigned to the case. "The logical consequence of his actions is she has lost confidence in him," Troiani says. "He just doesn't seem to understand words have consequences. He's saying a victim of a crime should be afraid of him and now he wants her to trust him to be a witness for him?"

=== 2015 District Attorney race and defamation lawsuit ===
Bruce Castor, the District Attorney in charge of investigating Constand's original claim, decided to run for the position again after leaving office in 2008. Running against him was Democrat Kevin Steele, the incumbent Assistant District Attorney. Steele used the controversy in a campaign ad that criticized Castor for "not even trying" to perform a thorough investigation against Cosby. The local off-year election in a community of 800,000 residents gained international attention. Steele won the election with 89,718 votes to Castor's 72,574.

The new focus on Cosby's alleged sexual assaults forced Castor to respond to questions about his decision not to charge Cosby in 2004. He defended his actions by suggesting that Constand's story had been inconsistent, making her an unreliable witness. Because of this, Constand sued Castor for one count of defamation; and one count of false light and invasion of privacy, asking for more than $150,000 for each offense. "Instead of correcting his error, [Castor] chose to make plaintiff collateral damage for his political ambitions," Constand said in her complaint. Castor responded, "It's highly suspect that this entire incident is being brought out right before an election." Constand's attorney went on saying Castor was treating her as "political collateral" and suggesting that if Castor were elected, Constand would not cooperate in the re-opened criminal investigation against Cosby. In an open letter she issued in response to his comments, she said she believes he had "no intention of arresting Dr. Huxtable" in 2005 because he was running for governor.

=== 2015 criminal charge ===
Recently elected District Attorney Steele announced in late 2015, days before he officially took office (still acting as Assistant District Attorney), that a felony charge would be laid against Cosby on December 30 as a result of the accusations made by Andrea Constand. There was some urgency since the criminal statute of limitations in the case would expire after 12 years, at the beginning of January 2016.

Based on the very detailed arrest warrant filed on December 15, 2015, the alleged sexual assault on Constand is presumed to have occurred at Cosby's home in Cheltenham Township, PA, on an unspecified date between mid-January and mid-February 2004. (The news media coverage refers to the date of the incident as "January 2004"). The accusation against Cosby was first made to the Durham Regional Police Service near Constand's home in Pickering, Ontario, on January 13, 2005; the report was subsequently forwarded to the authorities in Pennsylvania. The warrant alleges that blue pills, said to be Benadryl by Cosby, were given to Constand who had also been drinking wine during the January 2004 incident.

Cosby appeared in court during the afternoon of December 30, 2015, to face the three second degree felony counts of aggravated indecent assault without entering a plea, arrange for bail, and be formally charged. Testimony from the Constand's civil suit had been reviewed by that time and the file was said to contain new information. Cosby had testified that the sexual contact was consensual. However, according to an article in People, Constand's lawyer, Dolores Troiani, referred to Cosby "as a narcissist who didn't realize Constand (who was in a relationship with a woman at the time of the alleged assault) is gay" in a 2015 filing during a defamation lawsuit by Cosby vs. Constand. The preliminary hearing was scheduled for January 14, 2016. In Pennsylvania, the maximum penalty for a conviction on aggravated indecent assault is 10 years in prison and a fine of $25,000. Cosby's attorney issued the following statement after the arraignment: "The charge ... came as no surprise, filed 12 years after the alleged incident and coming on the heels of a hotly contested election for this county's DA during which this case was made the focal point. ... We intend to mount a vigorous defense against this unjustified charge and we expect that Mr. Cosby will be exonerated by a court of law." On January 15, 2016, it was reported that former D.A. Bruce Castor had written a 2015 email to his successor, Risa Fermin, that acknowledged a verbal agreement that Cosby's testimony in the civil suit would not be used for a criminal trial.

=== 2017 mistrial declaration ===
On June 17, 2017, a US judge declared a mistrial in the Bill Cosby sex assault case after the jury remained deadlocked for days. The seven men and five women were unable to reach a unanimous decision after some 53 hours of deliberations in Norristown, Pennsylvania. District Attorney Kevin Steele, the district attorney who brought the charges, told reporters that the prosecution was seeking a retrial. "We will evaluate and review our case. We will take a hard look at everything involved and then we will retry it. As I said in court, our plan is to move this case forward as soon as possible." Cosby, who faced at least four separate civil lawsuits, refused to testify at the trial.

=== 2018 guilty verdict ===
On April 26, 2018, Cosby was found guilty of all three counts against Constand. On September 25, 2018, he was sentenced to 3 – 10 years in state prison. Cosby and his lawyers appealed.

=== Conviction overturned ===
On June 30, 2021, the Pennsylvania Supreme Court overturned Cosby's conviction, citing violations of his due process rights. The following situation was cited: previously in February 2005, District Attorney Bruce Castor declared in a press release that due to insufficient evidence rendering a conviction "unattainable", he "declines to authorize the filing of criminal charges" against Cosby regarding allegations Andrea Constand made against him. Castor said he did so to compel Cosby to testify in a civil lawsuit, brought by Constand, without the right to not incriminate himself as accorded by the Fifth Amendment to the United States Constitution. Cosby testified that he had given Constand Benadryl, and that he had separately provided Quaaludes to women he wanted to have sex with. Cosby settled the civil lawsuit by paying $3.38 million. As six of the seven Pennsylvania Supreme Court justices interpreted Castor's 2005 press release as a promise not to prosecute Cosby, leading to Cosby providing testimony in his civil lawsuit that was later used as key evidence in his criminal trial, resulting in him being convicted of assaulting Constand, the Pennsylvania Supreme Court concluded that Cosby's due process rights were violated. The court further barred prosecution of Cosby "on these particular charges".
