= White Owl =

Brand of cigars

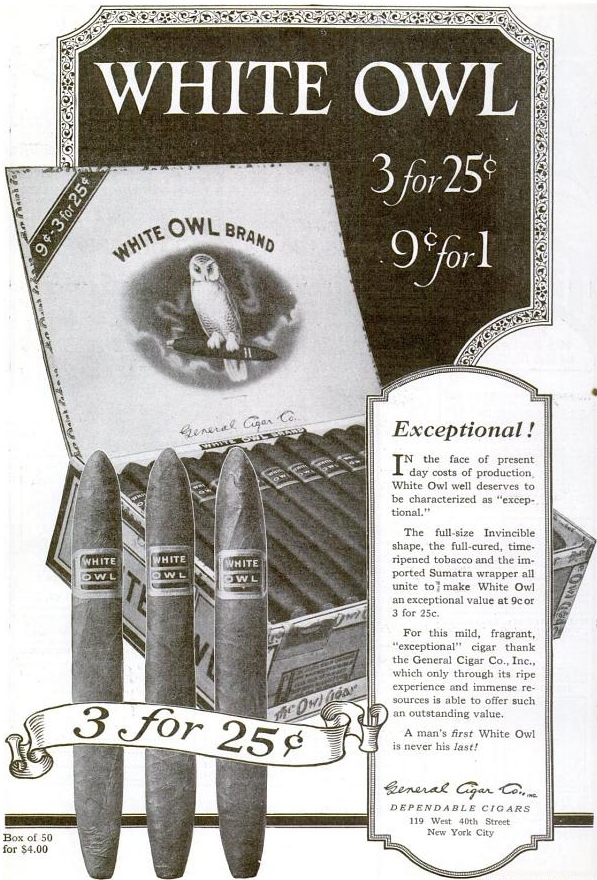
Magazine advertisement of "White Owl" invincible size. (1920)

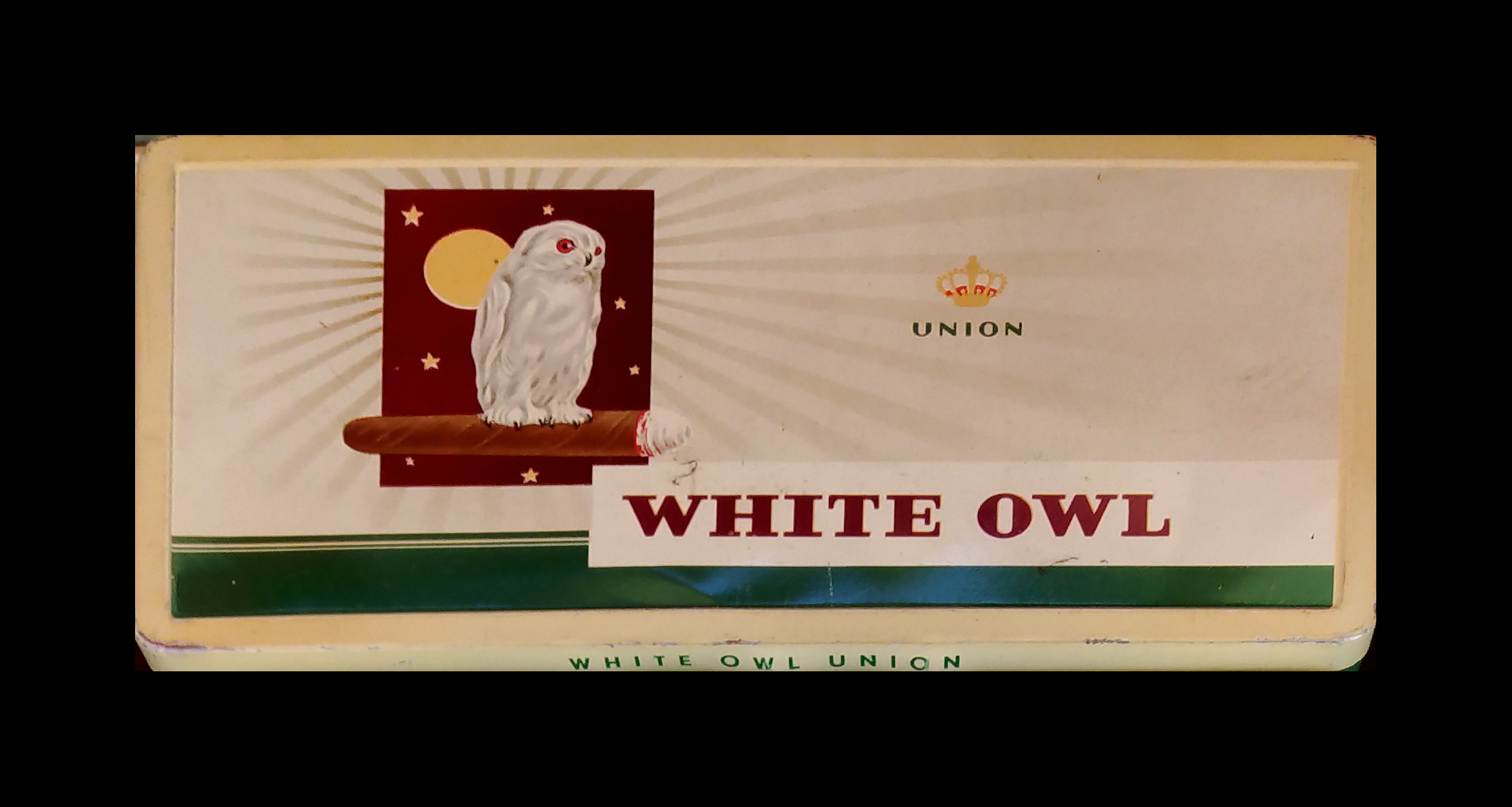
White Owl cigar tin

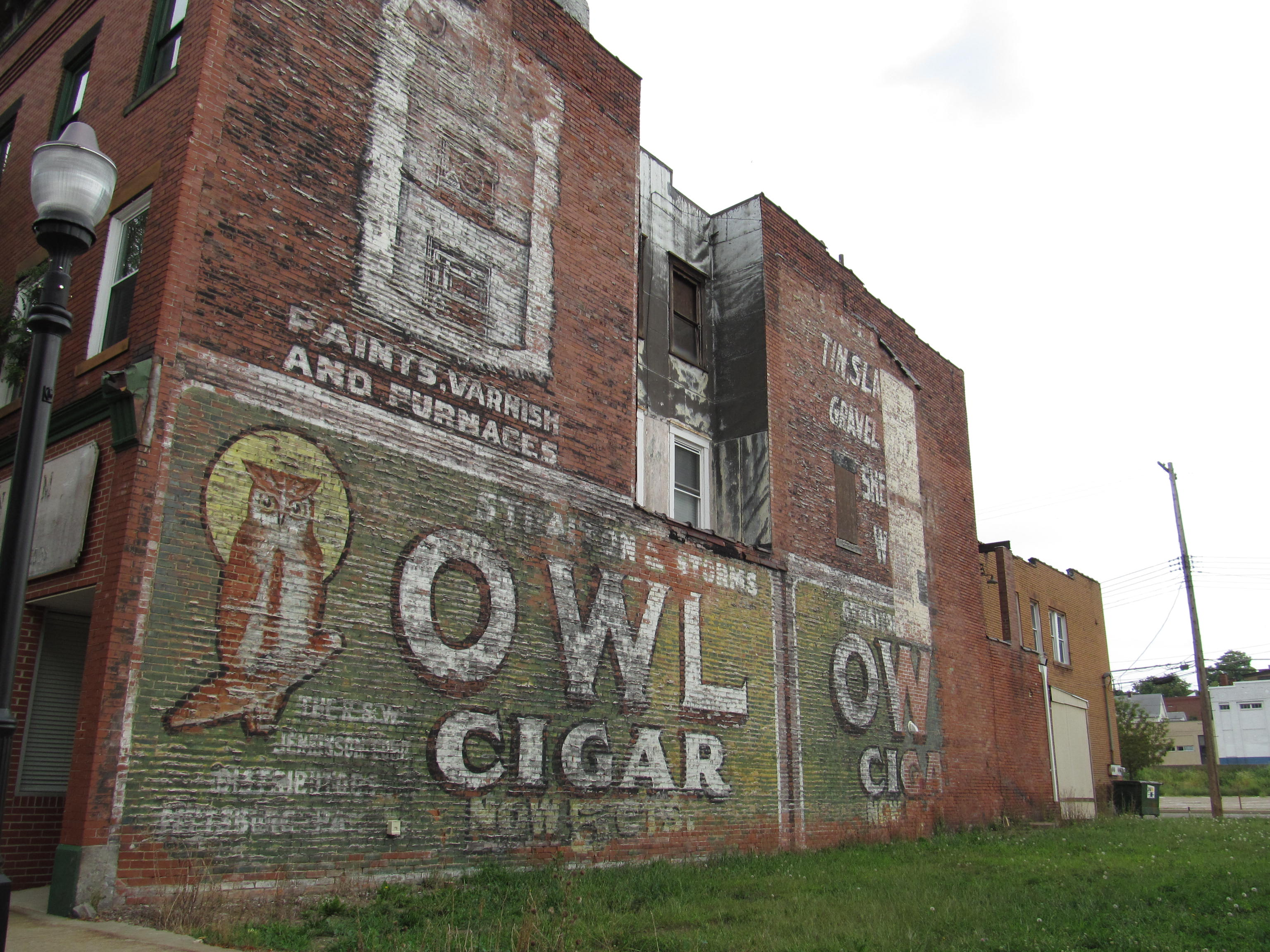
Owl Cigar ghost sign in New Kensington, Pennsylvania

White Owl is a brand of machine-produced cigars. The logo consists of a snowy owl perched on a cigar. The brand is owned by Swedish Match and was formerly owned by General Cigar Company.

As of 2011, White Owl cigars that are imported into Australia are produced in the Dominican Republic under the direction of an Owensboro, Kentucky, company.

== History ==
White Owl was created in 1887. In the 1920s, its "Invincible" cigar featured an imported Sumatran wrapper. In 1985, production was moved from Pennsylvania to Dothan, Alabama.

White Owl cigars were the first of many products endorsed by actor-comedian Bill Cosby, in what was seen as one of the first major examples of a black celebrity endorsing a product for the American public. Cosby reportedly approached the company to serve as a spokesman because he liked the slogan, "We're going to get you".

== Types ==
- Blunts
- Blunts Xtra
- Cigarillos
- Demi Tip
- Mini Sweets 50s
- Miniatures 50s
- New Yorker
- New Yorker 100s
- Ranger 120s
- Invincible
- Sport
