= Bill Cosby =

American entertainer (born 1937)

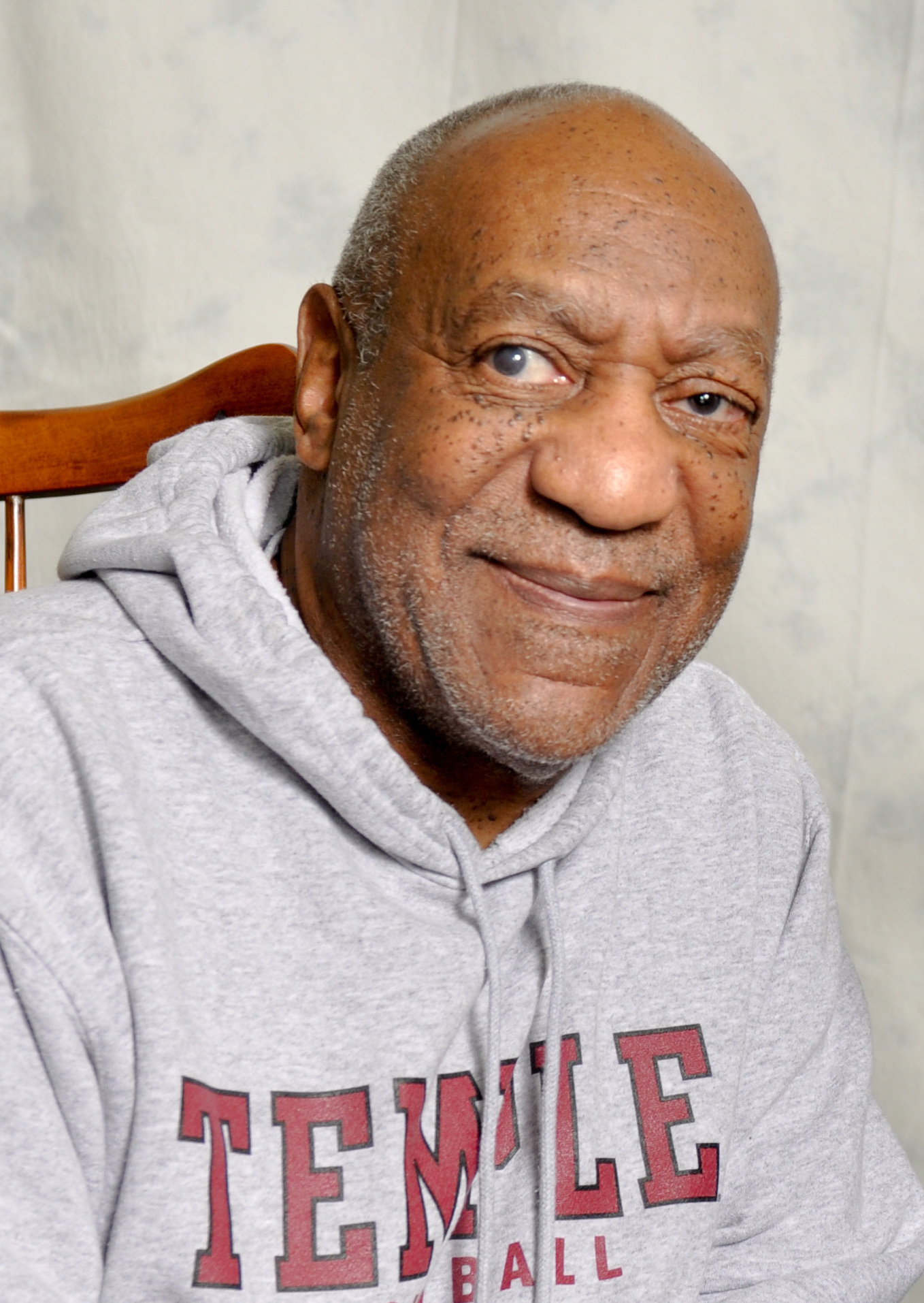
- Cosby in 2011
- Born: William Henry Cosby Jr. July 12, 1937 (age 89); Philadelphia, Pennsylvania, U.S.
- Education: Temple University (BS); University of Massachusetts Amherst (MA, EdD)
- Spouse: Camille Hanks (m. 1964)
- Children: 5, including Erika and Ennis

Comedy career
- Years active: 1961–2018
- Medium: Stand-up; television; film
- Genres: Observational comedy; surreal humor; clean comedy; deadpan; satire

William Henry Cosby Jr. (/ˈkɒzbi/ KOZ-bee; born July 12, 1937) is an American former comedian, actor, and media personality. Often deemed a trailblazer for African Americans in the entertainment industry, Cosby was well known in the United States for his stand-up comedy routines and television career before achieving global recognition for his portrayal of Cliff Huxtable in the sitcom The Cosby Show (1984–1992).

Cosby began his career as a stand-up comic at the Hungry I nightclub in San Francisco in 1961, and primarily performed observational comedy in a conversational style. He released LP records of numerous standup specials starting with Bill Cosby Is a Very Funny Fellow...Right! (1963) and starred in the comedy film Bill Cosby: Himself (1983). Cosby still holds the record for winning the most Grammy Awards for Best Comedy Album, with seven wins. His acting career began with a starring role in the NBC secret-agent show I Spy (1965–1968), which broke new ground for African Americans when he made history by winning three Primetime Emmy Awards for Best Actor in a Drama Series, becoming the first black actor to do so.

Cosby made his film debut starring in Man and Boy (1971) followed by Hickey & Boggs (1972), Uptown Saturday Night (1974), Let's Do It Again (1975), A Piece of the Action (1977), Leonard Part 6 (1987), and Ghost Dad (1990). He produced and starred in a series of television sitcoms such as The Bill Cosby Show (1969–1971), Fat Albert and the Cosby Kids (1972–1985) and The Cosby Show (1984–1992) as well as its spin-off A Different World (1987–1993), The Cosby Mysteries (1994–1995), and Cosby (1996–2000). He hosted Kids Say the Darndest Things (1998–2000). During his prolific career he advertised numerous products including the Jell-O ice pop treats Pudding Pop.

Over 60 women have accused Cosby of various offenses, including rape, drug-facilitated sexual assault, sexual battery, child sexual abuse and sexual harassment. Those allegations gained traction in 2014 after fellow comedian Hannibal Buress mentioned the allegations in a comedy set that went viral. Cosby has maintained his innocence. Reruns of The Cosby Show and other programs featuring Cosby were pulled from syndication. In 2018, he was convicted of aggravated sexual assault against Andrea Constand. He was imprisoned until the conviction was vacated in June 2021 by the Supreme Court of Pennsylvania on the grounds that Cosby's 5th Amendment and 14th Amendment due process rights had been violated. In 2022, Cosby was found liable for having sexually assaulted Judy Huth when she was 16 years of age, and in 2026 was found liable for sexually assaulting Donna Motsinger in Santa Monica in 1972, and made to pay $19 million in damages.

== Early life and further education ==
William Henry Cosby Jr. was born on July 12, 1937, in Philadelphia. He is one of four sons of Anna Pearl (née Hite), a maid, and William Henry Cosby Sr., who served as a mess steward in the U.S. Navy.

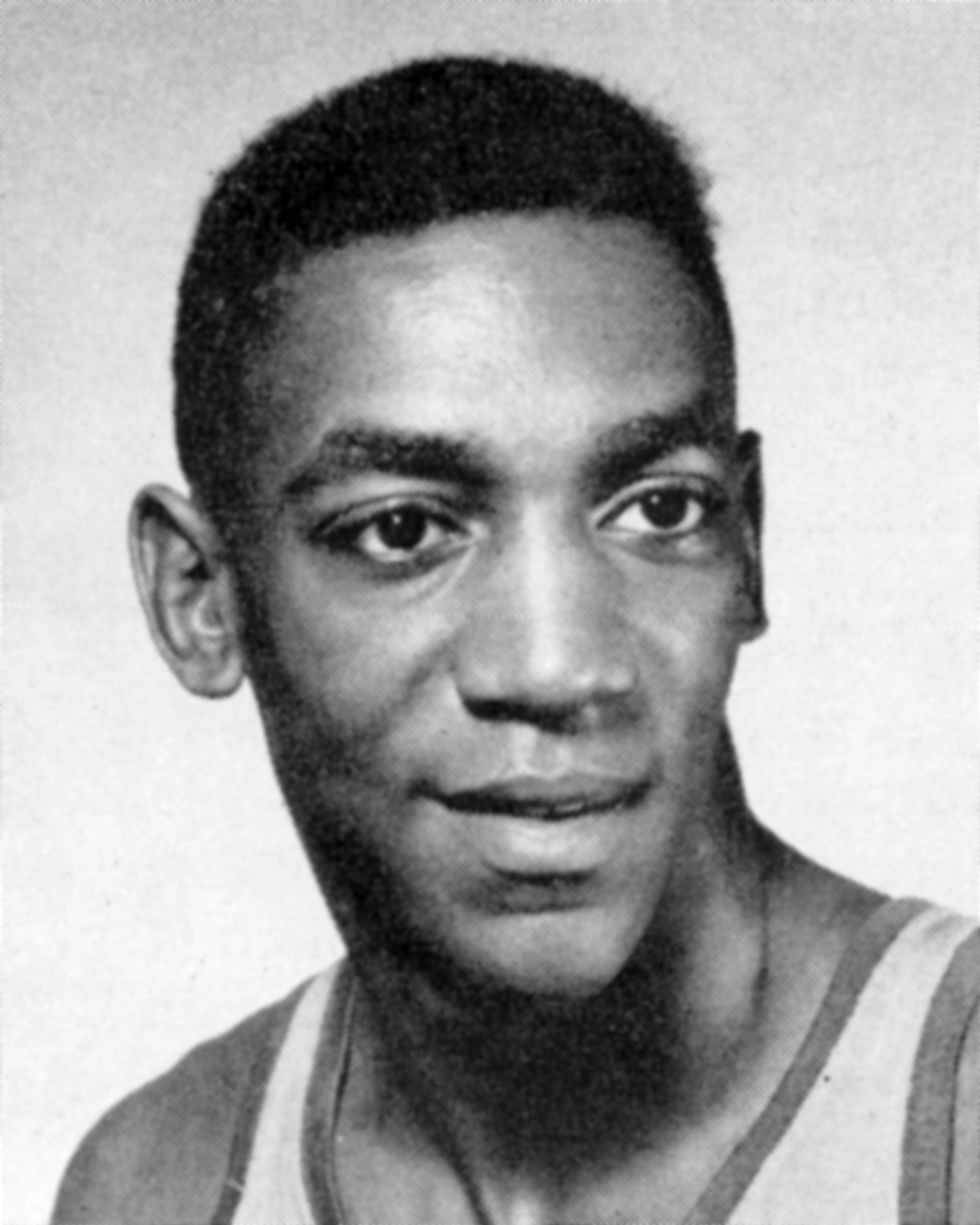
Cosby as a basketball player during his Navy service in 1957

Cosby was the class president as well as captain of both the baseball and track-and-field teams at Mary Channing Wister Public School in Philadelphia. Teachers noted his propensity for joking around instead of studying, and he described himself as the class clown. Cosby attended Philadelphia's Central High School, a magnet school and academically rigorous college prep school, where he ran track and played baseball, football, and basketball. He transferred to Germantown High School but failed the tenth grade.

In 1956, Cosby enlisted in the Navy and served as a hospital corpsman at the Marine Corps Base Quantico in Virginia; at Naval Station Argentia in Newfoundland, Canada; and at the National Naval Medical Center in Maryland. He worked in physical therapy with Navy and Marine Corps personnel who were injured during the Korean War. He served until 1960 and became a petty officer 3rd class.

Cosby earned his high school equivalency diploma (HSED) through correspondence courses and was awarded a track-and-field scholarship to Temple University in 1961. At Temple, he studied physical education while he ran track and played fullback on the college's football team. Cosby began bartending at a Philadelphia club, where he earned bigger tips by making the customers laugh. He then began performing on stage and left his university studies to pursue a career in comedy.

Cosby resumed his formal education in 1971. Temple University granted him his bachelor's degree on the basis of what it referred to as life experience. He then began graduate work at UMass Amherst, receiving his Master of Arts (MA) degree in 1972.

He returned to UMass Amherst, and in 1976, while producing Fat Albert and the Cosby Kids, he earned his Doctor of Education (Ed.D.) degree. His dissertation was titled An Integration of the Visual Media Via 'Fat Albert And The Cosby Kids' into the Elementary School Curriculum as a Teaching Aid and Vehicle to Achieve Increased Learning.

== Career ==
=== Stand-up comedy ===
External audio
- From Philly Projects to America's Dad, 17:30, Newsworks, WHYY
- Bill Cosby: the man and the trial, 49:44, Radio Times, WHYY

Cosby lined up stand-up jobs at clubs in Philadelphia and then in New York City, where he appeared at The Gaslight Cafe beginning in 1961. He booked dates in cities such as Chicago, Las Vegas, San Francisco, and Washington, D.C. On July 28, 1964, he received national exposure on NBC's The Tonight Show. This led to a recording contract with Warner Bros. Records which, in 1964, released his debut LP, Bill Cosby Is a Very Funny Fellow...Right!, the first of a series of comedy albums. His album To Russell, My Brother, Whom I Slept With was number one on Spin magazine's list of "The 40 Greatest Comedy Albums of All Time", calling it "stand-up comedy's masterpiece".

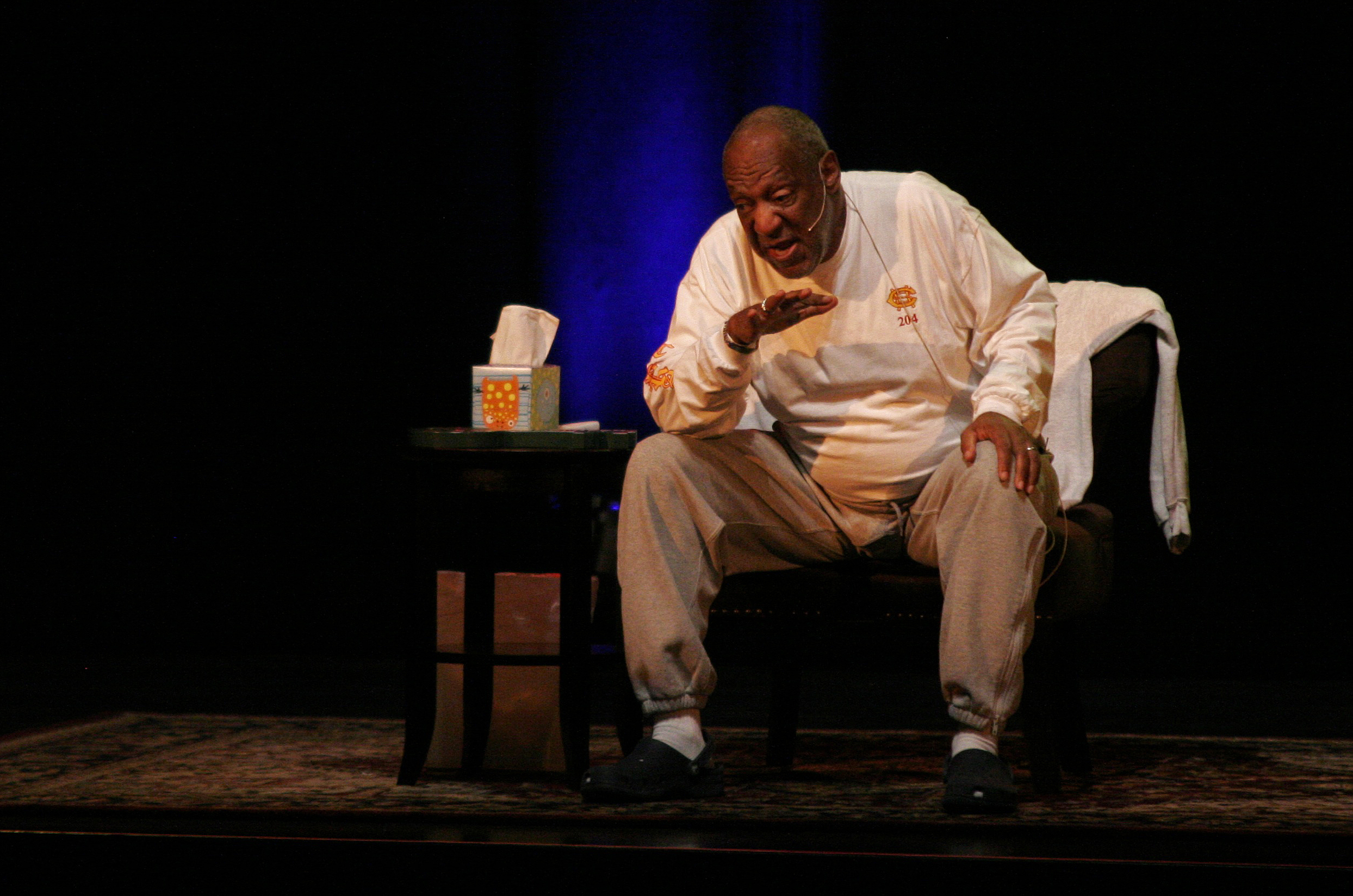
Cosby performing in 2011

Cosby's comedy genres included observational comedy, satire, surreal humor and deadpan. While many comics of the time were using the growing freedom of that decade to explore controversial and sometimes risqué material, Cosby was making his reputation with humorous recollections of his childhood. Many Americans wondered about the absence of race as a topic in Cosby's stories. As Cosby's success grew, he had to defend his choice of material regularly; as he argued, "A white person listens to my act and he laughs and he thinks, 'Yeah, that's the way I see it too.' Okay. He's white. I'm Negro. And we both see things the same way. That must mean that we are alike. Right? So I figure this way I'm doing as much for good race relations as the next guy."

In 1983, Cosby released the live comedy performance film Bill Cosby: Himself, in which he gave his views ranging from marriage to parenthood. The film also showcased Cosby's conversational style of stand-up comedy; for most of the performance, Cosby was seated center-stage, only getting up to emphasize a joke. Nearly all of Cosby's routine in the film concerned the trials and tribulations of parenting, frequently illustrated with anecdotes involving his own family. Many of the comedic routines presented in the film were precursors to Cosby's most popular sitcom, The Cosby Show. The film was well regarded by comedians and critics, with some calling it "the greatest stand up concert movie ever." Rolling Stone placed Cosby's concert film Bill Cosby: Himself as number 8 on its list of "The 25 Best Stand-Up Specials of All Time", acknowledging the significance of the film while still saying: "Yes, it's damned near impossible to watch anything the tainted comedian has done and not think of the headlines, the heckling, the revelations and what is, by any definition, monstrous behavior." They also placed Cosby at number 8 on their list of "The Best Stand-up Comics of All Time", saying: "Bill Cosby is not likely to perform again; listening to his records will never have that gentle, sweet sense of nostalgia for anyone; and while it is impossible to disconnect the performer from the man, scrubbing his name from the annals of stand-up would be impossible."

Cosby performed his first TV stand-up special in 30 years, Bill Cosby: Far from Finished, on Comedy Central on November 23, 2013. His last show of the "Far from Finished" tour was performed at the Cobb Energy Performing Arts Centre in Atlanta on May 2, 2015. In 2014, Cosby was set to release his new standup special Bill Cosby 77 on Netflix. The release of the film was canceled due to allegations of sexual assault against Cosby. His last known standup performance prior to his conviction was held at the LaRose Jazz Club in Philadelphia on January 23, 2018.

=== Television and film ===
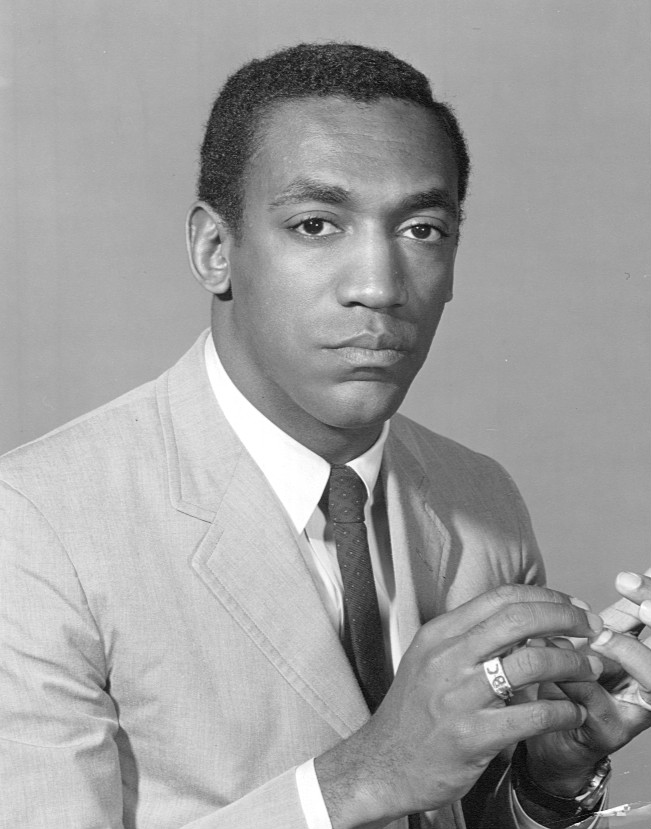
Cosby in I Spy, 1966

In 1965, Cosby was cast alongside Robert Culp in the I Spy espionage adventure series on NBC. I Spy became the first weekly dramatic television series to feature an African American in a starring role. At first, Cosby and NBC executives were concerned that some affiliates might be unwilling to carry the series. At the beginning of the 1965 season, four stations declined the show; they were in Georgia, Florida, and Alabama. Viewers were taken with the show's exotic locales and the authentic chemistry between the stars. It became one of the ratings hits of the season. I Spy finished among the twenty most-watched shows that year, and Cosby was honored with three consecutive Emmy Awards for Outstanding Lead Actor in a Drama Series. When accepting his third Emmy for the show, Cosby told the audience: "Let the message be known to bigots and racists that they don't count!"

During the series' run, Cosby continued to do stand-up comedy performances and recorded half a dozen record albums for Warner Bros. Records. He also began to dabble in singing, recording Silver Throat: Bill Cosby Sings in 1967. In June 1968, Billboard magazine reported that Cosby had turned down a five-year, $3.5 million contract renewal offer and would leave the label in August that year to record for his own record label.

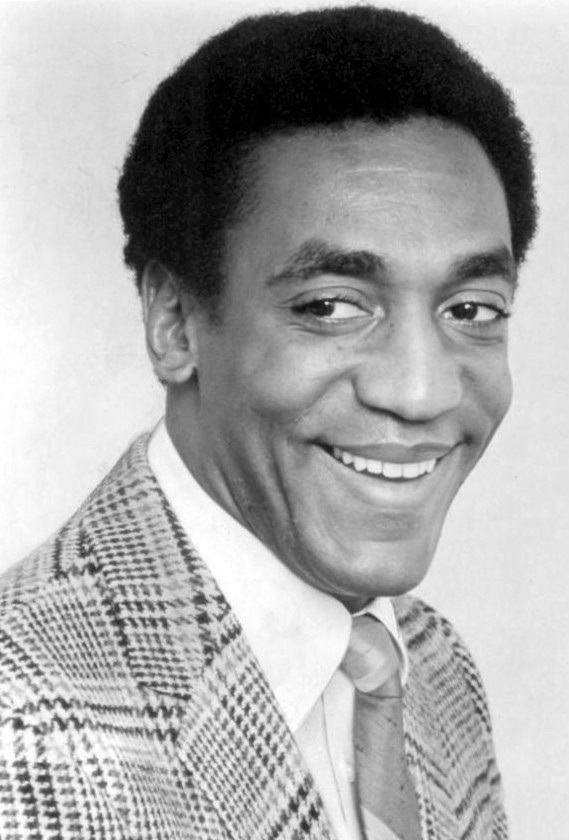
Cosby in 1969

In July 1968, Cosby narrated Black History: Lost, Stolen, or Strayed, a CBS documentary addressing the representation of black people in popular culture. Andy Rooney wrote the Emmy-awarded script for Cosby to read. Georgetown University professor Michael Eric Dyson said it was one of "the rare exceptions when Cosby took off the gloves and blinders, to discuss race in public with candor and discernment". Due to its popularity and controversial nature, it was rebroadcast less than a month later.

Tetragrammaton Records, a division of the Campbell, Silver, Cosby (CSC) Corporation—the Los Angeles–based production company founded by Cosby, his manager Roy Silver, and filmmaker Bruce Post Campbell—produced films as well as records, including Cosby's television specials, the Fat Albert cartoon special and series, and several motion pictures. CSC hired Artie Mogull as President of the label. Tetragrammaton was fairly active during 1968–69 but ceased trading during the 1970s.

Throughout the 1960s Cosby pursued a variety of additional television projects and appeared as a regular guest host on The Tonight Show and as the star of an annual special for NBC. In 1969, he returned with another series, The Bill Cosby Show, a situation comedy that ran for two seasons. Cosby played a physical education teacher at a Los Angeles high school. While only a modest critical success, the show was a hit with ratings, finishing eleventh in its first season. Cosby was lauded for using African American performers such as Lillian Randolph, Moms Mabley, and Rex Ingram as characters. According to commentary on the Season 1 DVDs for the show, Cosby was at odds with NBC over his refusal to include a laugh track in the show, as he felt viewers had the ability to find humor for themselves when watching a TV show.

For the PBS series The Electric Company, Cosby recorded several segments teaching reading skills to young children. Cosby resumed his formal education in 1971; he began graduate work at UMass Amherst. In 1972, he was back in prime time with a variety series, The New Bill Cosby Show. However, this show lasted only a season. More successful was a Saturday-morning cartoon, Fat Albert and the Cosby Kids, hosted by Cosby and based on his own childhood. That series ran from 1972 to 1979, then ran as The New Fat Albert Show in 1979, and finally ran as The Adventures of Fat Albert and the Cosby Kids. Cosby would use his experience producing Fat Albert in his educational endeavors; his dissertation for his Ed. D. at UMass Amherst discussed the use of Fat Albert and the Cosby Kids as a teaching tool in elementary schools.

During the 1970s, Cosby and other African-American actors, including Sidney Poitier, joined forces to make successful comedy films to counter the violent "blaxploitation" films of the era, such as Uptown Saturday Night in 1974, Let's Do It Again in 1975, and A Piece of the Action in 1977. He also starred in Mother, Jugs & Speed, co-starring Raquel Welch and Harvey Keitel in 1976. In 1978, he starred in California Suite, a compilation of four Neil Simon plays.

Cosby also hosted Cos in 1976. In addition, he produced an hour-long variety show featuring puppets, sketches, and musical numbers. It was during this season that ABC decided to take advantage of this phase of Cosby's career, by joining with Filmation producers of Fat Albert to create live-action segments starring Cosby, for the 1972 animated film Journey Back to Oz; it subsequently aired in syndication. Cosby was also a regular on children's public television programs starting in the 1970s, hosting the "Picture Pages" segments that lasted into the early 1980s.

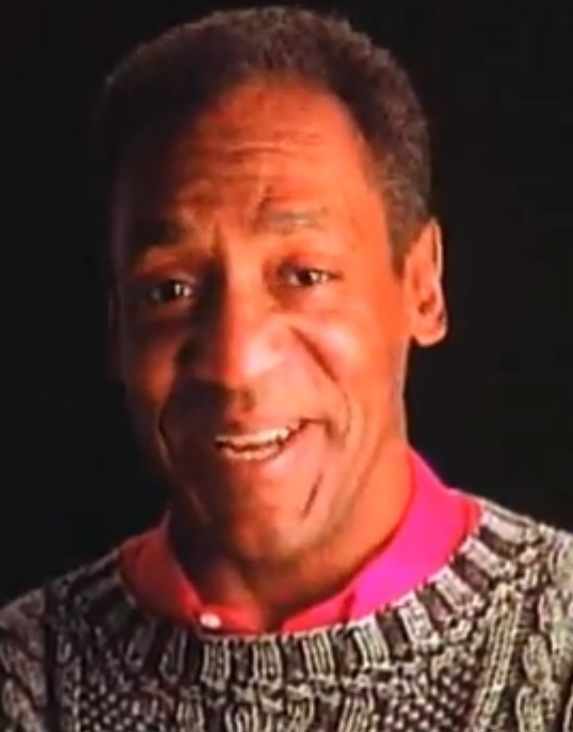
Cosby in 1990, wearing a sweater similar to the ones he wore on The Cosby Show in the role of Cliff Huxtable

Cosby's greatest television success came in September 1984 with the debut of The Cosby Show. Cosby, an advocate for family-oriented humor, co-produced the series, held creative control and involved himself in every aspect of production. Plots were often based on ideas that Cosby suggested while in meetings with the writing staff. The show had parallels to Cosby's actual family life: like the characters Cliff and Clair Huxtable, Cosby and his wife Camille were college-educated and financially successful, and they had five children. On the show, Cosby played the role of an obstetrician. Much of the material from the pilot and first season of The Cosby Show was taken from his video Bill Cosby: Himself, released in 1983. The series was an immediate success, debuting near the top of the ratings and having five consecutive No. 1 ratings in its eight-season run.

In 1987, Cosby attempted to return to film with the spy spoof Leonard Part 6. Although Cosby himself was the producer and wrote the story, he realized during production that the film was not going to be what he wanted and publicly denounced it, warning audiences to stay away. The film was however marked the first project for Columbia to be greenlighted by studio executive David Puttman. Later in the 1980s, Cosby served as an advisor to the Los Angeles Student Film Institute.

After The Cosby Show went off the air in 1992, Cosby embarked on a number of other projects, which included a revival of the classic Groucho Marx game show You Bet Your Life (1992–93), the TV movie I Spy Returns (1994), and The Cosby Mysteries (1994). In the mid-1990s, he appeared as a detective in black-and-white film noir-themed commercials for Turner Classic Movies. During this time, he reunited with Sidney Poitier starring in Ghost Dad (1990) and appeared in minor roles in Robert Townsend's superhero comedy The Meteor Man (1993), and Francis Ford Coppola's coming of age film Jack (1996). In addition, he was interviewed in Spike Lee's HBO project 4 Little Girls (1997), a documentary about the 1963 racist bombing of a church in Birmingham, Alabama which injured 22 people, killing four girls.

Also in 1996, he started up a new show for CBS, Cosby, again co-starring Phylicia Rashād, his onscreen wife on The Cosby Show. Cosby co-produced the show for Carsey-Werner Productions. It centered on Cosby as Hilton Lucas, an iconoclastic senior citizen who tries to find a new job after being downsized and, in the meantime, gets on his wife's nerves. Madeline Kahn co-starred as Rashād's goofy business partner Pauline. Cosby was hired by CBS to be the official spokesman of its Detroit affiliate WWJ-TV during an advertising campaign from 1995 to 1998. Cosby also hosted a CBS special, Kids Say the Darndest Things, on February 6, 1995, which was followed after as a full-season show, with Cosby as host, from January 9, 1998, to June 23, 2000. After four seasons, Cosby was canceled. Its last episode aired April 28, 2000. Kids Say the Darndest Things was terminated the same year.

A series for preschoolers, Little Bill, created by Cosby as a semi-biographical representation of his childhood growing up in Philadelphia, made its debut on Nickelodeon in 1999. The network renewed the popular program in November 2000. In 2001, Cosby's agenda included the publication of a new book, as well as delivering the commencement addresses at Morris Brown College, Ohio State University, and at Rensselaer Polytechnic Institute. Also that year, he signed a deal with 20th Century Fox to develop a live-action feature film centering on the popular Fat Albert character from his 1970s cartoon series. Co-written and executive produced by Cosby, Fat Albert was released in theaters in December 2004. Cosby makes an appearance in the film as himself.

In May 2007, Cosby spoke at the commencement of High Point University. In the summer of 2009, Cosby hosted a comedy gala at Montreal's Just for Laughs, the largest comedy festival in the world. During this time he also made an appearance in Mario Van Peebles film Baadasssss! in 2003.

=== Advertising ===
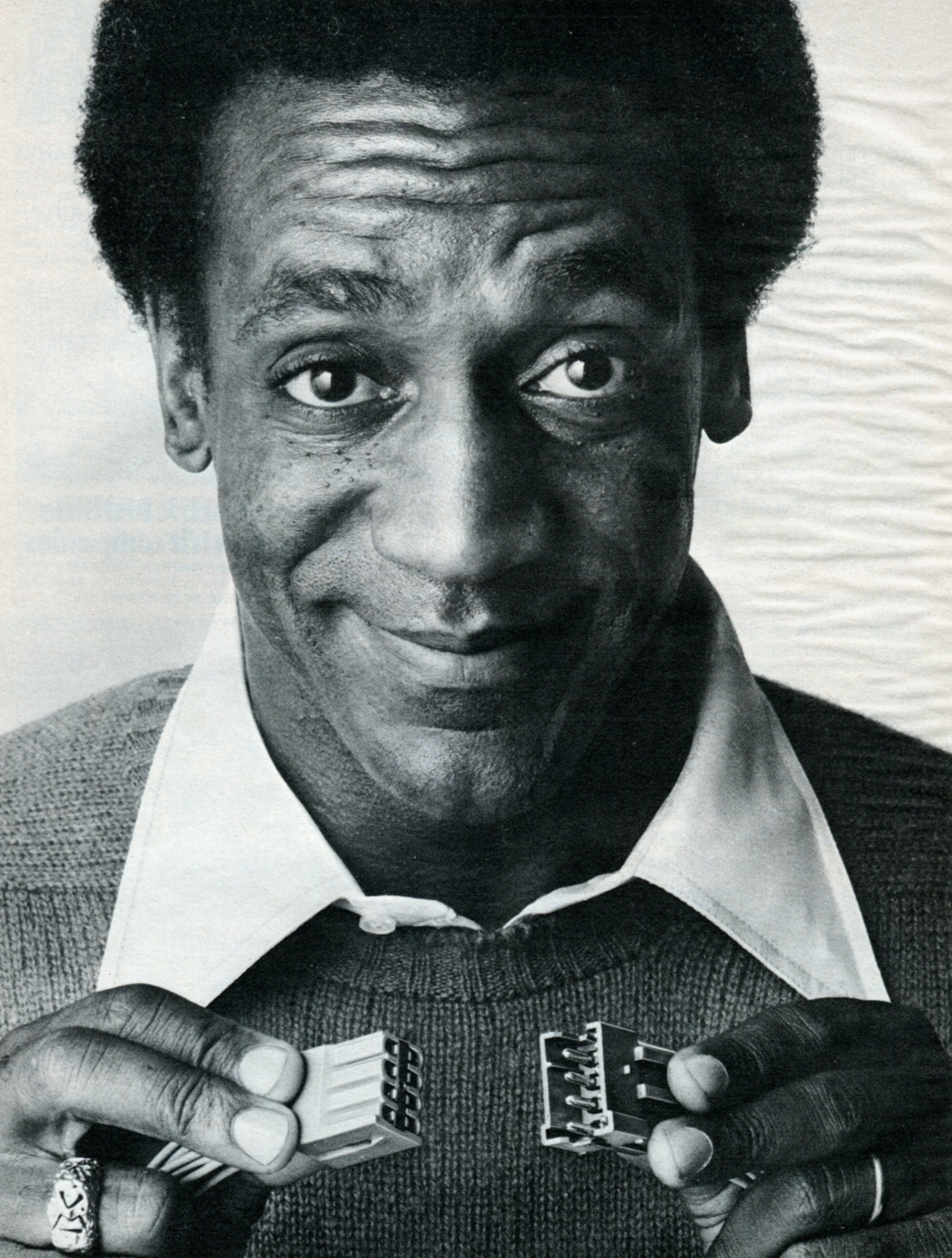
Cosby in a 1976 Ford advertisement

Cosby was a popular spokesperson for advertising from the 1960s – before his first starring television role – until the early 2000s. He started with White Owl cigars, and later endorsed Jell-O pudding and gelatin, Del Monte, Ford Motor Company, Coca-Cola (including New Coke), American Red Cross, Texas Instruments, E. F. Hutton & Co., Kodak, and the 1990 United States census. As of 2002, Cosby held the record for being the longest-serving celebrity spokesperson for a product, through his work with Jell-O. In 2011, he won the President's Award for Contributions to Advertising from the Advertising Hall of Fame.

Cosby was one of the first black people to appear in the United States as an advertising spokesperson. He was known for his appeal to white consumers in the second half of the 20th century, in an industry seen as slow to accept diversity. In spite of making contradictory soft drink pitches and endorsing a disgraced financial company, he continued to be considered effective and believable. In the 1980s, studies found Cosby the "most familiar" and "most persuasive" spokesperson, to the point where Cosby attributed his wealth to these contracts primarily, over his television series.

Cosby's first advertisement was for White Owl cigars. His agent approached them in 1965, before the debut of I Spy, but after several appearances on the late-night talk program The Tonight Show, a signifier of success in American comedy. He told agent Norman Brokaw of William Morris Agency that he liked their tagline, "We're going to get you." Cosby later said there were no commercials "with a black person holding something, buying a product, so the absence of pictures, in retrospect, said a lot". Despite the stigma among advertisers around using a black spokesperson, sales of the product rose. According to an entry in Ad Age Encyclopedia, the public acceptance of Cosby and Robert Culp appearing as equals on I Spy made it possible for advertisers to show black people and white people together in their commercials.

First of all and lastly, I'm good—that's all—I'm good. I don't rewrite their material. I take it and I make it.

— Cosby attributing his success in the field, 1984

In 1974, Cosby began promoting Jell-O pudding for General Foods. Cosby said comedian Jack Benny, whose program the brand sponsored, was the only previous spokesman for Jell-O, but Kate Smith, Lucille Ball, and Andy Griffith have also pitched the brand. In previous campaigns since the brand's launch in 1902, it was targeted towards parents rather than to children, a practice from which the company departed in 2001. Cosby's early commercials were created at the Young & Rubicam advertising agency by Curvin O'Reilly. However, Cosby's Jell-O Pudding commercials were not permitted to be used on child-directed television because celebrity endorsements were prohibited in advertising to children. Sales immediately responded to the Cosby advertising with growth after what had been a long decline. In 1979, General Foods introduced Pudding Pops, the company's first frozen dessert product. With Cosby as spokesperson, it sold US$100 million its first year. After introducing Gelatin Pops and frozen Fruit Bars, the company's frozen desserts sales reached $300 million. Cosby was engaged to promote the flagging Jell-O gelatin product line in the mid-1980s, when General Foods introduced a holdable Jell-O product called "Jigglers". Sales increased seven percent during the first year of the promotion.

Cosby appeared in commercials for Coca-Cola's 1979 campaign, "Have a Coke and a Smile," and made a guest appearance at the Great Get-Together, a major bottlers' convention held that year. This campaign continued into 1981. Cosby returned as Coca-Cola's spokesperson in its 1982 "Coke Is It" campaign, a series of commercials mocking the Pepsi Challenge. Cosby continued to be a Jell-O spokesman through the 1990s. He was present for the lighting of the brand's first billboard in New York's Times Square in 1998. In 1999, Cosby's 25th year as spokesman for Jell-O, was also the final year he appeared in its advertising. The company distributed 120,000 copies of his picture book series, Little Bill, into American public libraries. Despite the transitions of advertising agencies (Note: Young & Rubicam Advertising had the Jell-O account since 1926, but lost it to FCB in 2000.) and despite the 1989 merger of General Foods into Kraft, the then-newly merged company Kraft General Foods let Cosby remain with Jell-O as their spokesperson. He appeared at the Utah State Senate in 2001 to designate Jell-O the official state snack, and made a promotional visit to the Jell-O Gallery in 2004. In 2010, Cosby returned to Jell-O as executive producer for the company's "Hello Jell-O" campaign. In return, the brand sponsored his weekly web show OBKB, a children's interview series similar to Kids Say the Darndest Things. As of 2002, Cosby's time with Jell-O was considered the longest-standing celebrity endorsement in American advertising history.

Cosby has not appeared in advertising roles since the widespread publicization of his sexual assault allegations in 2014.

== Legal issues ==
=== 1965–1996 allegations ===
The earliest allegation against Cosby dates back to December 1965: in 2005, Kristina Ruehli came forward as Jane Doe #12 in the Andrea Constand case and alleged that Cosby had drugged and assaulted her at that time in his Beverly Hills home. Further, Ruehli said she had told her boyfriend about the incident, and had told her daughter in the 1980s.

In the early 1980s, Joan Tarshis told freelance reporter John Milward about an alleged sexual assault by Cosby. Milward did not write about the allegations. In 1996, Playboy Playmate Victoria Valentino gave a videotaped interview in which she made sexual assault allegations against Cosby. The interview was conducted for an exposé on the lives of Playboy models, which was never published.

After the allegations resurfaced in 2014, Wendy Williams recalled that during her radio show in 1990, she referred to sexual assault allegations against Cosby that had been published in the National Enquirer tabloid. Williams said Cosby called her boss in the middle of the broadcast demanding that Williams be fired.

=== Later allegations and investigations (2000–2006) ===
On February 1, 2000, according to a statement provided by Detective Jose McCallion of the New York County District Attorney's Special Victims Bureau, Lachele Covington, who was 20 years old at the time, filed a criminal complaint against Cosby alleging that on January 28, 2000, at his Manhattan townhouse, he had tried to put her hands down his pants and then exposed himself. Covington also alleged that Cosby grabbed her breasts and tried to put his hands down her pants. Cosby was questioned and insisted "it was not true". The New York City Police Department (NYPD) referred her complaint to the D.A., but they declined to prosecute.

In January 2004, Andrea Constand, a former Temple University employee, accused Cosby of drugging and fondling her; however, in February 2005, Montgomery County, Pennsylvania's District Attorney said there would be no charges due to insufficient credible and admissible evidence. Constand then filed a civil claim in March 2005, with thirteen women as potential witnesses if the case went to court. Cosby settled out of court for an undisclosed amount in November 2006. After learning that charges were not pursued in the Constand case, California lawyer Tamara Lucier Green, the only publicly named woman in the prior case, came forward with allegations in February 2005 that Cosby had drugged and assaulted her in the 1970s. Cosby's lawyer said Cosby did not know her and that the events did not happen.

In a July 2005 Philadelphia Daily News interview, Beth Ferrier, one of the anonymous "Jane Doe" witnesses in the Constand case, alleged that in 1984 Cosby had drugged her coffee and she awoke with her clothes partially removed. In 2005, Shawn Upshaw Brown, a woman with whom Cosby admitted to having an extramarital affair in the 1970s, claimed in the National Enquirer that Cosby drugged and raped her the last time the two were together sexually. Brown is the mother of Autumn Jackson, who claims to be Cosby's illegitimate daughter. Jackson was convicted in 1997 of extortion after she threatened to make the claims public in the Globe tabloid. In 2015, Brown went into more detail with her renewed allegations in an interview.

On June 9, 2006, Philadelphia magazine published an article by Robert Huber, titled "Dr. Huxtable & Mr. Hyde", which gave graphic detail about Constand's allegations, and the similar stories told by Green and Ferrer about how they stated that they too were drugged and sexually assaulted. With these severe allegations against Cosby, Huber wrote: "His lawyers have gotten it pushed to the back burner, down to a simmer, and maybe it will amount to nothing, yet there is also the possibility that it will bubble up to destroy him." The article also presented Barbara Bowman, who had come forward after having read about Constand's story, saying she could not sit in silence any longer. Details of Bowman's similar drug and sexual assault allegations were published in the magazine's November 1, 2006, issue. Bowman reported two incidents that happened around early 1986, wherein she was eighteen years old and working as an aspiring model and actress after her agent had introduced her to Cosby and he had become her good friend and mentor, saying that she escaped his attacks, returned home to Denver and Cosby thereafter subverted her career.

=== Hannibal Buress remarks (October 2014) ===
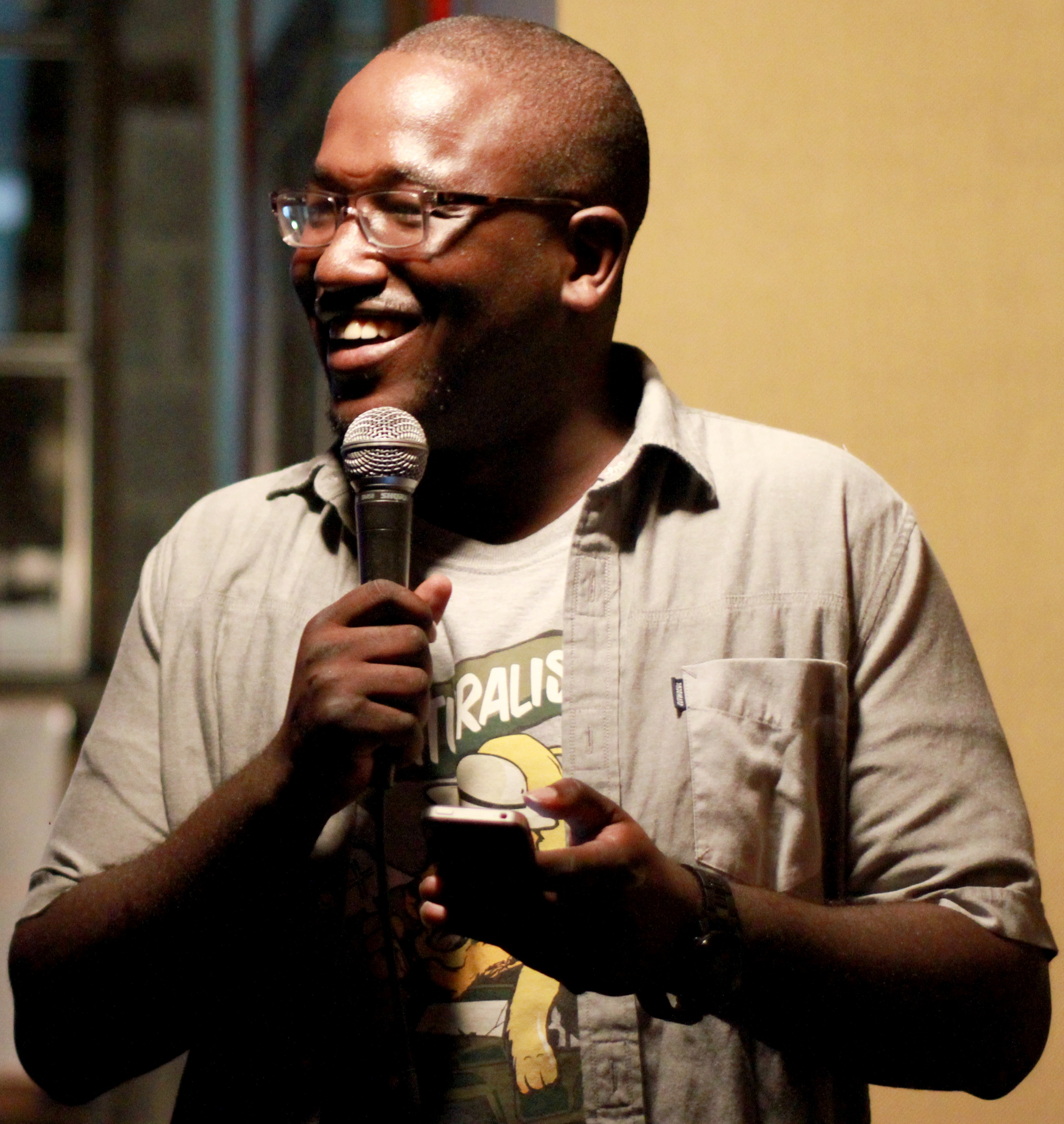
In a 2014 stand-up act, Hannibal Buress (pictured) publicly accused Cosby of rape.

On October 16, 2014, as part of a comedy routine in Philadelphia, Hannibal Buress addressed Cosby's legacy of "talk[ing] down" to young black men about their mode of dress and lifestyle. Buress criticized the actor's public moralizing by saying: "Yeah, but you raped women, Bill Cosby, so that kind of brings you down a couple notches."

The audience appeared to respond to Buress's accusation as a bad joke, then he encouraged everyone to search "Bill Cosby rape" on Google when they got home. Buress had been using the same Cosby routine for the previous six months with little response, but word of the October performance spread rapidly after being posted on Philadelphia magazine's website. Media coverage intensified, with numerous publications tackling the question of how Cosby had managed to maintain, as Buress called it in his routine, a "teflon image" despite more than a decade of public sexual abuse accusations.

Shortly afterward, USA Today reported that either Cosby or his representative posted a request for Twitter followers to "Go ahead. Meme me!" The tweet was deleted after a large number of the submitted memes made reference to the accusations against Cosby.

=== Additional assault allegations ===
After Buress's remarks came to the attention of journalist Joan Tarshis, in November 2014, model Janice Dickinson, actress Louisa Moritz, actor Lou Ferrigno's wife Carla, Florida nurse Therese Serignese, Playboy Playmates Valentino and Sarita Butterfield, actress Michelle Hurd, and eleven other women also made accusations of alleged assaults by Cosby committed against them between 1965 and 2004. Charlotte Laws wrote a November 2014 article published by Salon accusing Cosby of assaulting a friend of hers, with whom she subsequently had lost contact. The following month, in a Vanity Fair article, model Beverly Johnson alleged that she was drugged by Cosby during a 1986 audition, and that she knew other women with similar accounts.

Cosby's attorney said Dickinson's account differed from prior accounts she had given of the incident and released a statement that said in part: "Mr. Cosby does not intend to dignify these allegations with any comment." A follow-up statement dismissed the allegations as "unsubstantiated" and an example of "media vilification". A joint statement from Cosby and Constand, who had received a civil settlement in 2006, clarified the statement released a few days prior by stating that it did not refer to Constand's case, which was resolved years ago.

In January 2015, Cindra Ladd alleged that Cosby drugged and sexually assaulted her in 1969. In May 2015, Lili Bernard claimed that Cosby sexually assaulted her in the early 1990s, and that she had been interviewed by police in Atlantic City, New Jersey, regarding the allegation. Because the state of New Jersey has no statute of limitations for rape, Bernard hoped charges would be brought, but media reports noted that "it wasn't clear ...if what [Bernard] says happened to her happened in New Jersey."

On July 27, 2015, New York magazine's cover featured images of 35 women sitting in chairs with the last chair empty, suggesting there may be more victims who have not come forward yet. The 35 women told "their stories about being assaulted by Bill Cosby, and the culture that wouldn't listen". Eleven other women known to New York who alleged sexual assault by Cosby declined to be photographed and interviewed for the feature. According to Vox, the stories span "more than five decades" and are "remarkably similar, typically involving the comedian offering a woman a cup of coffee or some sort of alcoholic beverage—which may be spiked with drugs—and allegedly sexually assaulting the victim as she's impaired or unconscious."

On September 17, 2015, A&E broadcast the documentary Cosby: The Women Speak, a program in which thirteen alleged victims were interviewed. By October 24, nearly sixty women had claimed they were sexually abused by Cosby, and the terms "sociopath" and "serial rapist" were used to describe him. Jewell Allison, one of Cosby's accusers, described him as a "sociopath" and stated: "We may be looking at America's greatest serial rapist that ever got away with this for the longest amount of time. He got away with it because he was hiding behind the image of Cliff Huxtable."

=== Aftermath ===
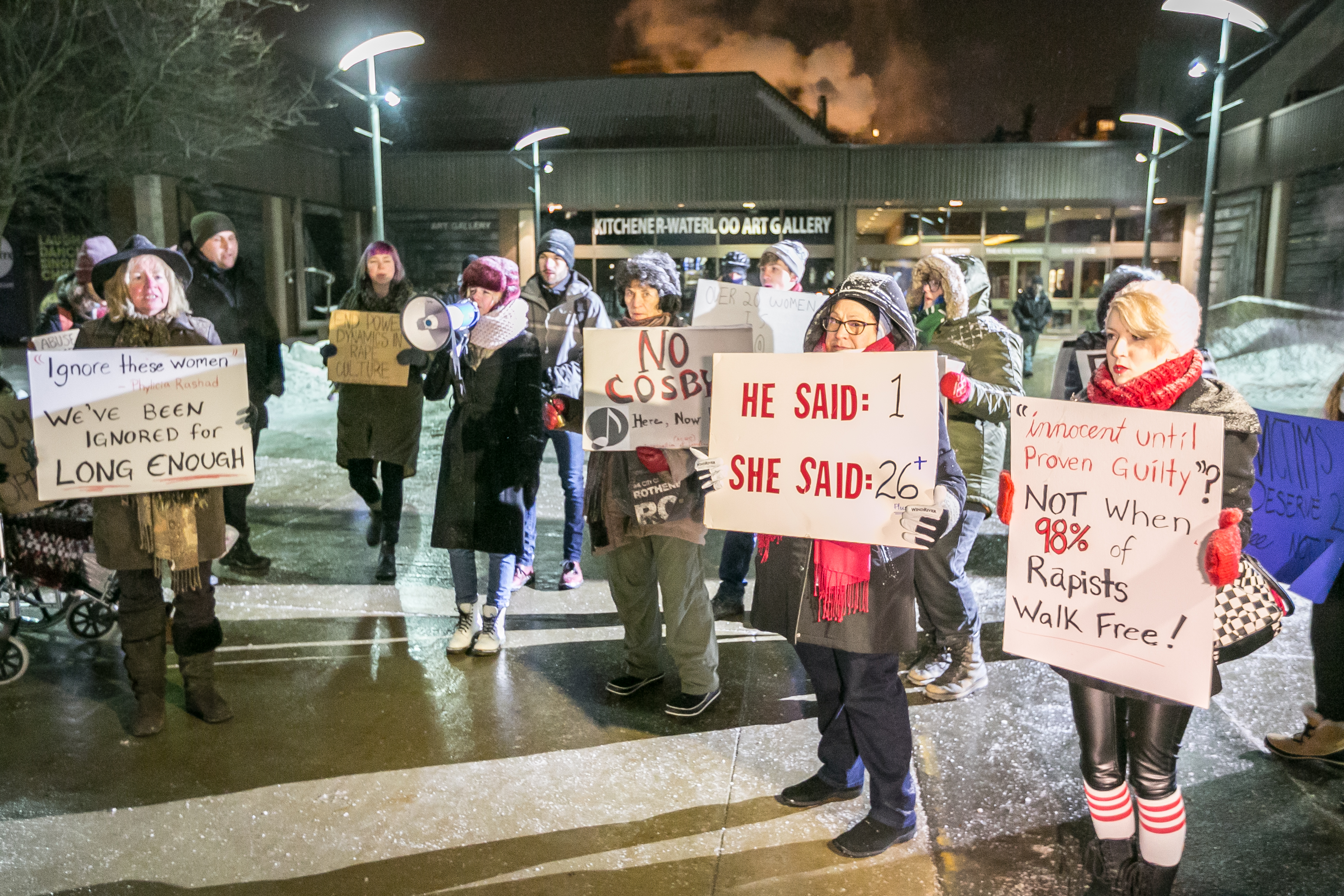
Demonstrators protesting against Cosby in Kitchener, Ontario, Canada

Cosby has repeatedly denied the allegations and maintained his innocence. In November 2014, he responded to a question about the allegations and said: "I don't talk about it." In past interviews that were made public, Cosby declined to discuss the accusations. However, he told Florida Today: "People shouldn't have to go through that and shouldn't answer to innuendos." In May 2015, he said: "I have been in this business 52 years and I've never seen anything like this. Reality is a situation and I can't speak."

In the wake of the allegations, numerous organizations have severed ties with Cosby, and honors and titles that were previously awarded to him have been revoked. Reruns of The Cosby Show and other shows featuring Cosby have also been pulled from syndication by many organizations. Twenty-five colleges and universities have rescinded honorary degrees.

In July 2015, PAVE: Promoting Awareness and Victim Empowerment, a nonprofit group focusing on sexual assault prevention, launched a WhiteHouse.gov petition, calling upon President Barack Obama to revoke Cosby's Presidential Medal of Freedom (which Cosby received from President George W. Bush in July 2002). Later the same month, in response to a question at a news conference, President Obama said:

There's no precedent for revoking a medal. We don't have that mechanism. And, as you know, I tend to make it a policy not to comment on the specifics of cases where there might still be, if not criminal, then civil, issues involved. [long pause] I'll say this, if you give a woman, or a man for that matter, without his or her knowledge, a drug, and then have sex with that person without consent, that's rape. And I think this country, any civilized country, should have no tolerance for rape.

==== Trial, conviction, and conviction overturn ====
Commonwealth of Pennsylvania v. William H. Cosby, Jr.
- Court: Montgomery County Court of Common Pleas
- Decided: April 26, 2018
- Verdict: guilty of aggravated indecent assault
- Citations: Commonwealth v. Cosby, CP-46-CR-00008386-2015 (Montgomery County, Pennsylvania Court of Common Pleas, 2018

Case history
- Appealed to: Penn. Supreme Ct.
- Subsequent action: Conviction Overturned

Court membership
- Judge sitting: Steven O'Neill

With the exception of Andrea Constand's allegations, most of the sexual assault allegations against Cosby have fallen outside of the statutes of limitations for criminal prosecution. Numerous civil lawsuits have been brought against him. Attorney Gloria Allred has represented 33 of Cosby's alleged victims. In July 2015, some of the court records from Andrea Constand's 2005 civil suit against Cosby were unsealed and released to the public. The full transcript of his deposition was also released to the media by a court reporting service. In his testimony, Cosby admitted to casual sex with a series of young women involving the recreational use of the sedative methaqualone (Quaalude); he further acknowledged that his dispensation of the prescription drug was illegal.

On April 26, 2018, following a jury trial, Cosby was found guilty of three counts of aggravated indecent assault against Andrea Constand. An initial trial on the charges had ended in a mistrial when the jurors could not reach a unanimous verdict. On September 25, 2018, he was sentenced to three to ten years in state prison and a $25,000 fine, together with court costs of both trials. After a brief period in the Montgomery County Correctional Facility, Cosby was moved to a state prison, SCI Phoenix in Skippack Township, Pennsylvania, on September 25, 2018, where he was confined to a single cell. On January 28, 2019, Cosby was moved from administrative segregation into the general population. On December 10, 2019, the verdict was upheld by the Pennsylvania Superior Court on the initial level of appeal.

On June 23, 2020, the Pennsylvania Supreme Court agreed to hear a further level of appeal of Cosby's sexual assault conviction based on questions about testimony from a witness being "more prejudicial than probative". The court would hear his appeal on arguments of whether it was proper for the judge to allow five prosecution witnesses to testify in the case about prior, unrelated instances of sexual assault, and to permit the jury to learn of a deposition in which Cosby admitted to giving Quaaludes to other women in the past to facilitate sexual encounters. The court also agreed to review whether Cosby's rights were violated by being prosecuted in the Constand matter, after a former prosecutor had informed Cosby that he would not be prosecuted for the assault, resulting in Cosby's agreeing to testify without claiming his self-incrimination privilege in his accuser's civil lawsuit.

On June 30, 2021, the Pennsylvania Supreme Court overturned Cosby's conviction, citing violations of his due process rights. According to Justice David Wecht, "Even though society has a strong interest in prosecuting crimes, it has an even stronger interest in ensuring that the constitutional rights of the people are vindicated." The following situation was cited: previously in February 2005, District Attorney Bruce Castor declared in a press release that due to insufficient evidence rendering a conviction "unattainable", he "declines to authorize the filing of criminal charges" against Cosby regarding allegations Andrea Constand made against him. Castor said he did so to compel Cosby to testify in a civil lawsuit, brought by Constand, without the right to not incriminate himself as accorded by the Fifth Amendment to the United States Constitution, so that Constand could win damages from Cosby. Cosby testified that he had given Constand Benadryl, and that he had separately provided Quaaludes to women he wanted to have sex with. Cosby settled the civil lawsuit by paying $3.38 million. Six of the seven Pennsylvania Supreme Court justices interpreted Castor's 2005 press release as a promise not to prosecute Cosby, which led Cosby to provide testimony in his civil lawsuit that was later used as key evidence in his criminal trial; thus, the Pennsylvania Supreme Court concluded that Cosby's due process rights were violated. The court further barred prosecution of Cosby "on these particular charges".

Cosby was released from prison on the same day that his conviction was overturned. He had served nearly three years before Pennsylvania's Supreme Court overturned his conviction. In November 2021, the District Attorney filed papers with the Supreme Court of the United States seeking to have the Court consider whether to overturn the decision of the state supreme court. Cosby's attorney filed a response in late January 2022, urging the Supreme Court to decline review. On March 7, 2022, the court declined to review the decision of the Pennsylvania court.

Cosby's legal issues continued following his release from prison. In 2014, Judy Huth had filed a civil suit against Cosby in California, alleging that he had sexually assaulted her in 1975, when she was 16 years old. The trial began in 2022, and the jury ruled in Huth's favor. Cosby was ordered to pay $500,000 in compensatory damages. A separate civil suit was filed in 2023 by Donna Motsinger, who alleged that Cosby drugged and sexually assaulted her in 1972; in a deposition, Cosby reportedly named Dr. Leroy Amar as the person who gave him the quaaludes he used on Motsinger. Cosby was ordered to pay $19.25 million to Motsinger in March 2026.

== Legacy ==
=== Influence on other comedians ===
Before the 2014 allegations, younger, well-established comics like Jerry Seinfeld had credited Cosby as an innovator both as a practitioner of stand-up comedy, as well as a person who paved the way for comics to break into sitcom television.

Seinfeld said of Cosby: "He opened a door for all of us, for all of the networks to even consider that this was a way to create a character, was to take someone who can hold an audience just by being up there and telling their story. He created that. He created the whole idea of taking a quote-unquote 'comic' and developing a TV show just from a persona that you see on stage."

Comedian Larry Wilmore also saw a connection between Bill Cosby: Himself and the later success of The Cosby Show, saying: "It's clear that the concert is the template for The Cosby Show."

=== Impact of sexual assault allegations on Cosby's legacy ===
Joan Tarshis, who had accused Cosby of raping her, within a Salon.com article, compared Cosby's damaged legacy to that of O. J. Simpson, saying: "When you hear O. J. Simpson's name, you don't think 'Oh, great football player'. That doesn't come to mind first. I'm thinking it's not going to be 'Oh, great comedian'. It's going to be 'Oh, serial rapist'."

In 2015, Ebony magazine released an issue with the allegations against Cosby as the cover story, discussing the importance of The Cosby Show and if it is possible to separate Bill Cosby from Cliff Huxtable. The cover depicted a photograph of the Huxtables with a cracked frame, symbolizing the show's damaged and complicated legacy.

In late 2018, the Christmas song "Baby, It's Cold Outside" was pulled from several radio stations amid controversy that its lyrics allegedly promote sexual predation. Susan Loesser, daughter of composer Frank Loesser, blamed Bill Cosby for backlash against its lyric "say, what's in this drink?". Loesser said, "Bill Cosby is ruining it for everybody. ... Ever since Cosby was accused of drugging women, I hear the date rape thing all the time. ... I think it would be good if people looked at the song in the context of the time. It was written in 1944. It was a different time."

The 2022 premiere of the 21st season of Law & Order touched on the Cosby cases, with the plot being centered around the murder of an entertainer (in this case a singer) released from prison after his conviction was overturned in a manner resembling Cosby's. Like Cosby, he had been accused of many counts of rape yet maintained his innocence but was shot and killed by a victim looking for revenge.

In 2022, W. Kamau Bell released the Showtime documentary We Need to Talk About Cosby, which explores Cosby's life and career up to his sexual assault cases, through conversations with comedians, journalists, and survivors. A representative for Cosby issued a statement days prior to the series's premiere, stating: "Mr. Cosby has spent more than 50 years standing with the excluded; made it possible for some to be included; standing with the disenfranchised; and standing with those women and men who were denied respectful work because of race and gender within the expanses of the entertainment industries, continues to be the target of numerous media that have, for too many years, distorted and omitted truths ... intentionally. Mr. Cosby vehemently denies all allegations waged against him. Let's talk about Bill Cosby. He wants our nation to be what it proclaims itself to be: a democracy."

== Personal life ==
Cosby has been married to Camille Cosby (née Hanks) since January 25, 1964. Together, they have five children, two of whom are deceased: Erika (born 1965), Erinn (born 1966), Ennis (1969–1997), Ensa (1973–2018), and Evin (born 1976). Their only son, Ennis, was murdered on January 16, 1997, while changing a flat tire on the side of Interstate 405 in Los Angeles. Cosby's daughter Ensa died of renal disease on February 23, 2018, while awaiting a kidney transplant. The Cosbys have three grandchildren. Cosby, a Protestant, maintains homes in Shelburne, Massachusetts, and Cheltenham, Pennsylvania.

Cosby hosted the Los Angeles Playboy Jazz Festival from 1979 to 2012. Known as a jazz drummer, he can also be seen playing bass guitar with Jerry Lewis and Sammy Davis Jr. on Hugh Hefner's 1970s talk show. His story, "The Regular Way", was featured in Playboy's December 1968 issue. Cosby has become an active member of The Jazz Foundation of America. Cosby became involved with the foundation in 2004. For several years, he has been a featured host for its annual benefit, A Great Night in Harlem, at the Apollo Theater in New York City.

Cosby and his wife have collected more than three hundred works of African-American art since 1967. The works went on display in "Conversations", an exhibit at the National Museum of African Art in 2014. The show was controversial because of the sexual assault allegations made against Cosby.

Cosby is a supporter of his alma mater, Temple University, particularly its men's basketball team, the Temple Owls, whose games Cosby frequently attended prior to his arrest. He is also a member of the Omega Psi Phi fraternity; he was initiated in the fraternity's Beta Alpha Alpha graduate chapter in White Plains, New York, in 1988, and served briefly on the board of directors for the CDC Foundation.

In 2016, Cosby's attorneys reported that he is now legally blind. In April 2017, Cosby agreed to be interviewed by the National Newspaper Publishers Association, because, as Andrew Wyatt, his spokesman, stated, "they grew comfortable that the NNPA Newswire would be more interested in 'facts over sensationalism'." In the interview, both Cosby and one of his former publicists confirmed the loss of eyesight, noting that it occurred at some point in 2015.

Following his release from prison in 2021, Cosby was reported to be attempting to make a post-prison comeback. Plans for the comeback included a comedy tour that would go from the United States to Canada to London, with Cosby's team having contacted a number of promoters and comedy clubs about performance opportunities. It was also reported that Cosby was working on a five-part docuseries that covers his legacy and his experience in prison, and that he was planning on releasing a book. Later in September, it was reported that Cosby put his plans for a comeback on hold due to ongoing legal problems.

=== Politics and views ===
Cosby endorsed Reverend Jesse Jackson in his 1984 and 1988 presidential bids. Cosby received an award at the celebration of the 50th-anniversary commemoration of Brown v. Board of Education ruling—a ruling of the U.S. Supreme Court that outlawed racial segregation in public schools. Later, in May 2004, he made public remarks critical of African Americans who put higher priorities on sports, fashion, and "acting hard" than on education, self-respect, and self-improvement. He pleaded for African American families to educate their children on the many different aspects of American culture. In the Pound Cake speech, Cosby asked that African American parents teach their children better morals at a younger age. As reported in The Washington Times, Cosby "told reporters during a special session of the Congressional Black Caucus Foundation's 34th annual legislative conference [that] parenting needs to come to the forefront. If you need help and you don't know how to parent, we want to be able to reach out and touch you." Richard Leiby of The Washington Post reported, "Bill Cosby was anything but politically correct in his remarks Monday night at a Constitution Hall bash commemorating the 50th anniversary of the Brown v. Board of Education decision."

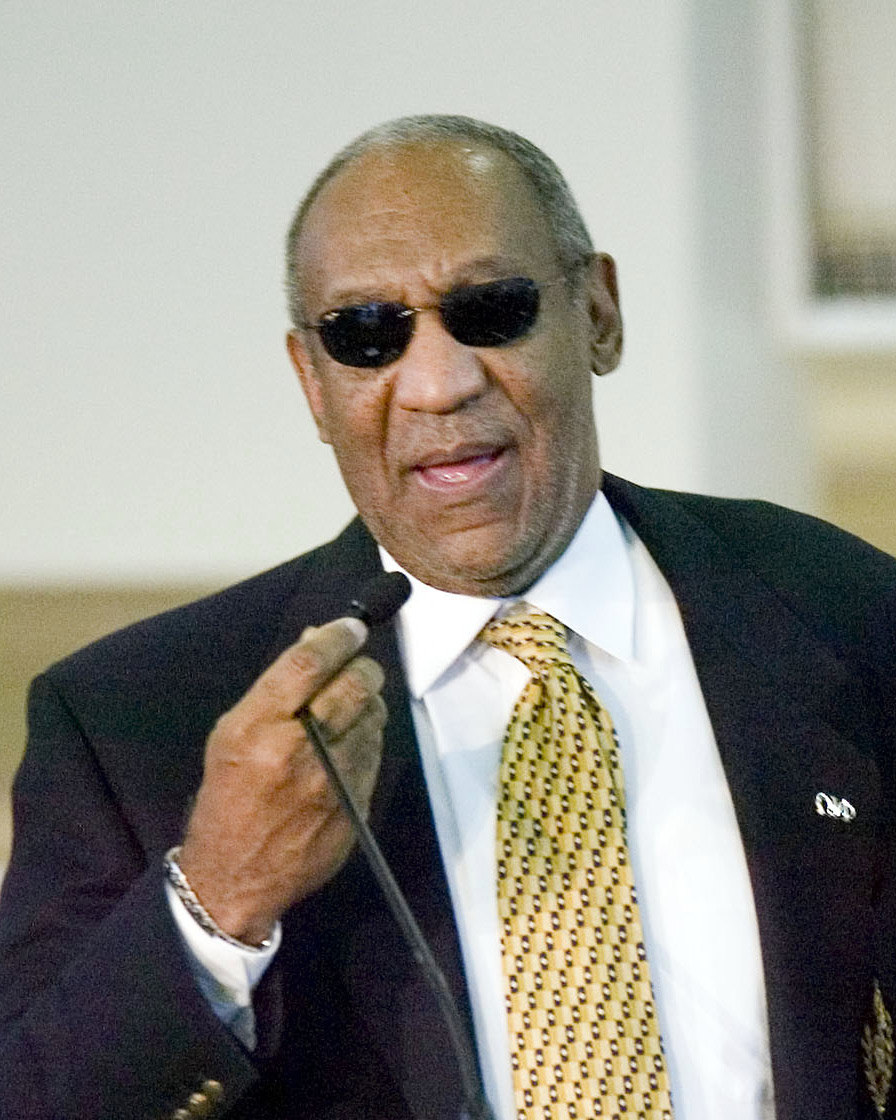
Cosby at Frederick Douglass High School in Atlanta, in 2006

Cosby was again criticized, and was largely unapologetic, for his stance when he made similar remarks during a speech at a July 1 meeting of the Rainbow/PUSH Coalition that commemorated the anniversary of Brown v. Board, where he said: "... you've got to stop beating up your women because you can't find a job, because you didn't want to get an education and now you're [earning] minimum wage." During that speech, he admonished Blacks for not assisting or concerning themselves with the individuals who are involved with crime or have counterproductive aspirations. He further described those who needed attention as Blacks who "had forgotten the sacrifices of those in the Civil Rights Movement".

External videos
- After Words interview with Michael Eric Dyson on Is Bill Cosby Right: Or Has the Black Middle Class Lost Its Mind?, May 15, 2005, C-SPAN
- Book group discussion on Is Bill Cosby Right: Or Has the Black Middle Class Lost Its Mind?, February 28, 2006, C-SPAN

In 1985, Cosby was openly critical of All In The Family and Norman Lear, telling journalist Gary Deeb that Lear was "full of shit" and alleged that Lear was glorifying Archie Bunker, whom Cosby described as "the hero of that show". Cosby elaborated that "many people are very proud to go around saying 'Archie was saying what was in my body, in my mind, in my bones.' If that's the case, that's really sad man." However, Deeb pointed out to Cosby that Archie Bunker in fact "invariably wound up each episode looking like a horse's rear and that fact, in effect, prevented him from being perceived as a hero by anybody with even minor intelligence."

In 2005, Georgetown University sociology professor Michael Eric Dyson wrote a book, Is Bill Cosby Right? Or Has the Black Middle Class Lost Its Mind? In the book, Dyson wrote that Cosby was overlooking larger social factors that reinforce poverty and associated crime; factors such as deteriorating schools, stagnating wages, dramatic shifts in the economy, offshoring and downsizing, chronic underemployment, and job and capital flight. Dyson suggested that Cosby's comments "betray classist, elitist viewpoints rooted in generational warfare". However, Cornel West defended Cosby and his remarks, saying: "He's speaking out of great compassion and trying to get folk to get on the right track, 'cause we've got some brothers and sisters who are not doing the right things, just like in times in our own lives, we don't do the right thing ... He is trying to speak honestly and freely and lovingly, and I think that's a very positive thing."

In a 2008 interview, Cosby mentioned Philadelphia, Atlanta, Chicago, Detroit, Oakland, California, and Springfield, Massachusetts among the cities where crime was high and young African American men were being murdered and jailed in disproportionate numbers. Cosby stood his ground against criticism and affirmed that African American parents were continuing to fail to inculcate proper standards of moral behavior. After Barack Obama was elected president, Cosby expressed strong approval of the incoming President, despite publicly giving the impression that he was more miffed towards Obama in November 2007.

Cosby has also been critical of conservative Republican politicians in regard to their views on socioeconomic and racial issues. In a 2013, CNN interview regarding voting rights, Cosby stated "this Republican Party is not the Republican Party of 1863, of Abraham Lincoln, abolitionists and slavery, is not good. I think it's important for us to look at the underlying part of it. What is the value of it? Is it that some people are angry because my people no longer want to work for free?" Cosby's social commentary led to the unsealing of documents in a previous civil suit by a woman who had accused Cosby of sexual assault, which in turn sparked renewed interest in older allegations. The judge ruled that releasing the sealed documents was justified by the "stark contrast between Bill Cosby, the public moralist and Bill Cosby, the subject of serious allegations concerning improper (and perhaps criminal) conduct".

== Awards and honors ==
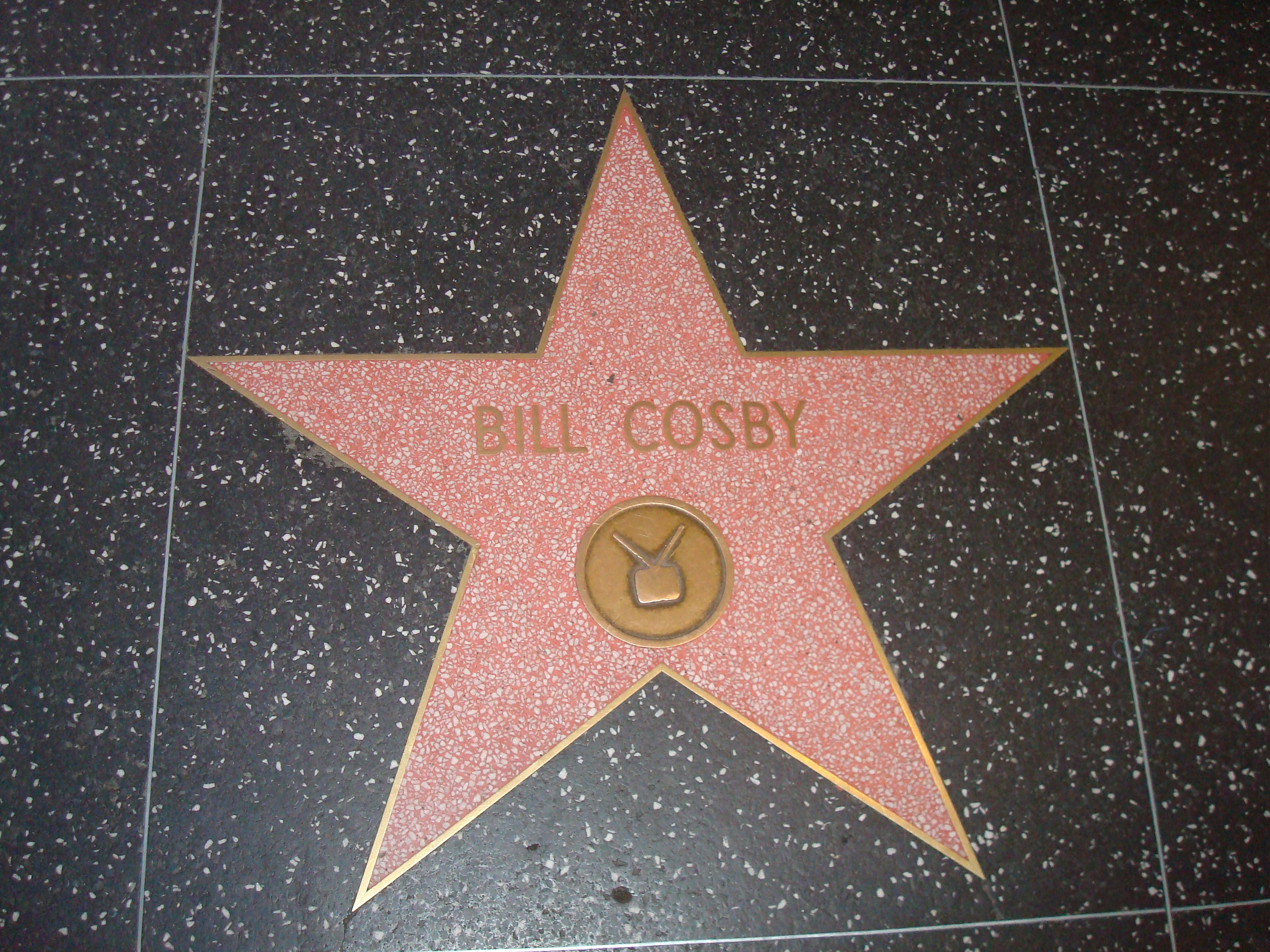
Cosby's star on the Hollywood Walk of Fame, awarded in 1977

Cosby received various awards and numerous honorary degrees for his work as a standup comedian and actor in both television and film including five Primetime Emmy Awards, eight Grammy Awards, two Daytime Emmy Awards, and two Golden Globe Awards. He also received the Presidential Medal of Freedom from George W. Bush in 2002, and the Bob Hope Humanitarian Award in 2003. He also received a Star on the Hollywood Walk of Fame in 1977.

Due to the sexual assault allegations against Cosby, numerous awards and honors were rescinded, including the Kennedy Center Honor that he received in 1998 and was rescinded in 2018, as well as the Mark Twain Prize for American Humor, which he received in 2009 and was rescinded in 2018. On May 3, 2018, Cosby was expelled as a member of the Actors Branch of the Academy of Motion Picture Arts and Sciences, along with Roman Polanski and Harvey Weinstein, due to their breach of the academy's standards of conduct.

== Works ==
=== Filmography ===
Cosby had a starring role in the television secret-agent show I Spy (1965–1968) opposite Robert Culp, and made history when Cosby won the Primetime Emmy Award for Outstanding Lead Actor in a Drama Series in 1966, making him the first African American to earn an Emmy Award for acting. Cosby's acting career continued as he starred in the sitcom The Bill Cosby Show, which ran for two seasons from 1969 to 1971.

In 1972, using the Fat Albert character developed during his stand-up routines, Cosby created, produced, and hosted the animated comedy television series Fat Albert and the Cosby Kids which ran until 1985, centering on a group of young friends growing up in an urban area. Throughout the 1970s, Cosby starred in various films including the western film Man and Boy (1971), a reuniting with Culp in the crime film Hickey & Boggs (1972), and Sidney Poitier's crime comedies Uptown Saturday Night (1974), Let's Do It Again (1975), and A Piece of the Action (1977). He also starred in the comedies Mother, Jugs & Speed (1976) and Neil Simon's California Suite (1978) alongside Richard Pryor. He also starred in the original cast of The Electric Company alongside Rita Moreno and Morgan Freeman from 1971 to 1973.

Beginning in the 1980s, Cosby produced and starred in The Cosby Show, which was rated as the number-one show in America from 1985 through 1989. The sitcom highlighted the experiences and growth of an affluent African American family, and Cosby gained a reputation as "America's Dad" for his portrayal of Cliff Huxtable on the sitcom. Cosby produced the spin-off sitcom A Different World, which aired from 1987 to 1993. His 1983 comedy film Bill Cosby: Himself was well regarded by comedians and critics, with some calling it the greatest stand-up concert movie ever. Cosby also starred in The Cosby Mysteries (1994–1995), the sitcom Cosby (1996–2000) and hosted Kids Say the Darndest Things (1998–2000). He then created and produced the animated children's program Little Bill (1999–2004).

=== Discography ===
Cosby released a number of albums, including live recordings of his stand-up comedy as well as studio albums of both vocal and instrumental music. He charted a number of times on the Billboard Hot 100, including the 1967 single "Little Ole Man (Uptight, Everything's Alright)" from his album Silver Throat: Bill Cosby Sings.

=== Books written ===
- Cosby, Bill (1986). Fatherhood. New York: Doubleday. ISBN 978-0-385-23410-8. OCLC 15686687.
- Cosby, Bill (1987). Time Flies. New York: Doubleday. ISBN 978-0-385-24040-6. OCLC 16081611.
- Cosby, Bill (1989). Love and Marriage. New York: Doubleday. ISBN 978-0-385-24664-4. OCLC 18984758.
- Cosby, Bill (1991). Childhood. New York: Putnam. ISBN 978-0-399-13647-4. OCLC 23650310.
- Cosby, Bill (1998). Kids Say the Darndest Things. New York: Bantam Books. ISBN 978-0-553-11043-2. OCLC 39498709.
- Cosby, Bill (1999). Congratulations! Now What?: A Book for Graduates. New York: Hyperion. ISBN 978-0-7868-6572-7. OCLC 40979923.
- Allen, Dwight William; Cosby, Bill (2000). American Schools: The $100 Billion Challenge. New York: IPublish.com. ISBN 978-0-7595-5000-1. OCLC 48915448.
- Cosby, Bill; Booth, George (2001). Cosbyology: Essays and Observations from the Doctor of Comedy. New York: Hyperion. ISBN 978-0-7868-6810-0. OCLC 46359836.
- Cosby, Bill (2003). I Am What I Ate ... and I'm Frightened!!!: And Other Digressions from the Doctor of Comedy. New York: HarperEntertainment. ISBN 978-0-06-054573-4. OCLC 52387894.
- Cosby, Bill; Cosby, Erika (2003). Friends of a Feather: One of Life's Little Fables. New York: Harper Entertainment. ISBN 978-0-06-009147-7. OCLC 52206847.
- Cosby, Bill; Poussaint, Alvin F. (2007). Come on, People: On the Path from Victims to Victors. Nashville, TN: Thomas Nelson. ISBN 978-1-59555-092-7. OCLC 153581209.
- Cosby, Bill (2011). I Didn't Ask to Be Born (But I'm Glad I Was). New York: Center Street. ISBN 978-0-89296-920-3. OCLC 707964887.

== See also ==
- List of comedians
- List of Omega Psi Phi members
- List of Temple University people
- List of University of Massachusetts Amherst alumni
