= Pudding Pop =

Frozen dessert

Jell-O Pudding Pops were frozen ice pop treats which were originally made and marketed by General Foods. They were launched with a marketing campaign fronted by actor and comedian Bill Cosby.

Pudding Pops were first introduced to stores in Denver and Cincinnati in 1978, and then Minneapolis and Salt Lake City a year later. They became more popular in the 1980s. In their first year, they earned $100,000,000 and after five years were earning $300,000,000 annually. Despite strong sales into the 1990s, Pudding Pops were eventually discontinued due to no longer being profitable.

They were reintroduced to grocery stores in 2004 under the brand name Popsicle. However, due to differences in texture to the original and being a different shape, their popularity never reached its previous height, and they began to be withdrawn from stores around 2011. Pudding Pops came in variety packs of chocolate, vanilla and chocolate vanilla swirl, which had 90 calories per serving, three grams of fat, and fifteen grams of carbohydrates.

== See also ==
- List of frozen dessert brands
