= Kids Say the Darndest Things =

American comedy television series

- Logo from the Bill Cosby era
- Genre: Comedy; Reality
- Directed by: Morris Abraham
- Presented by: Bill Cosby; Tiffany Haddish
- Composer: Bruce Miller
- Country of origin: United States
- Original language: English
- No. of seasons: 5
- No. of episodes: 92

Production
- Executive producers: Eddie Kritzer; Bill Paolantonio; Art Linkletter
- Producer: Eric Schotz
- Running time: 22–24 minutes; 60 minutes (with commercials)
- Production companies: LMNO Productions (1997–2000); Linkletter/Atkins/Kritzer Productions Inc. (1998–2000); CBS Productions (1997–2000); Anvil 1893 Entertainment, Inc. (2019–21); She Ready Productions (2019–21); CBS Studios (2019–21)

Original release
- Network: CBS (1997–2000, 2021); ABC (2019–20)
- Release: May 16, 1997 – June 23, 2000
- Release: October 6, 2019 – June 23, 2021

Related
- Art Linkletter's House Party

Kids Say the Darndest Things is an American television comedy series that was based on a feature segment of the same name on Art Linkletter's radio and television program, House Party. Linkletter hosted the segment on the program's CBS adaptation from 1959 to 1967. The network later resurrected the segment in the form of hour-long specials, hosted by Bill Cosby, that aired on May 16 and November 14, 1997, and then as a weekly series from January 9, 1998, to June 23, 2000. A revival of the program, hosted by Tiffany Haddish, aired on ABC from October 6, 2019, to January 19, 2020; after its initial cancellation, the series moved to CBS, its original network, airing for one additional season from May 5 to June 23, 2021.

== Premise ==
The host would begin a conversation by posing a question about life topics to a child, who would respond with his own innocent, often comedic perspectives on the various topics.

In the show's first inception, it would sometimes flash back to the 1950s and 1960s show Art Linkletter's House Party, with Cosby joined onstage by Linkletter to introduce the vintage clips. It would show children and their same comedic reactions to whatever Linkletter would ask or say to them. Cosby also provided some of the humor in the show.

The revival continued the premise, with part of the show performed in front of a live audience, and the rest featuring taped segments.

== Production ==
Kids Say... was developed in 1945 as a regular segment on Art Linkletter's CBS Radio program House Party; it was later carried over into the TV version of the program on the CBS television network, which aired concurrently with the radio show mostly five days a week from 1952 to 1969.

For the series' first iteration, Kids Say the Darndest Things was produced by CBS Productions with the co-production of LMNO Productions and Linkletter's company, Linkletter Productions.

The revival continued its CBS association via CBS Studios, and it was also co-produced by Haddish through her production company, She Ready Productions, and Eric Schotz of Anvil 1893 Entertainment.

== In other media ==
The subplot of the Family Guy episode "Brian Does Hollywood" features Stewie auditioning for the show in an attempt to hypnotize the entire world using a mind-control device, with Cosby later unwittingly foiling his plans.

In 2005, Robert Johnson and Albert Evans adapted the show into a full-length musical comedy.

== International versions ==
Country	Name	Host(s)	TV station	Premiere	Finale
Australia	Kidspeak	Andrew Daddo	Seven Network	1999	2000
Hungary	Gyerekszáj	Sándor Friderikusz	TV2	2000	2001
India	Badmaash Company - Ek Sharat Hone Ko Hains; Kutties Chutties (Tamil)	Juhi Chawla	Colors TV; Sun TV (Tamil)	2000	2000
Italy	Zitti tutti! Parlano loro	Carlo Conti	Rai 1	January 17, 2000	May 26, 2000
Singapore	Kids Talk Back	Andrew Lim	Television Corporation of Singapore	1999	1999
Singapore	Gurmit's Small Talk	Gurmit Singh	Television Corporation of Singapore	2003	2003
United Kingdom	Kids Say the Funniest Things	Michael Barrymore	ITV	December 27, 1998	October 8, 2000
