= Bill Cosby discography =

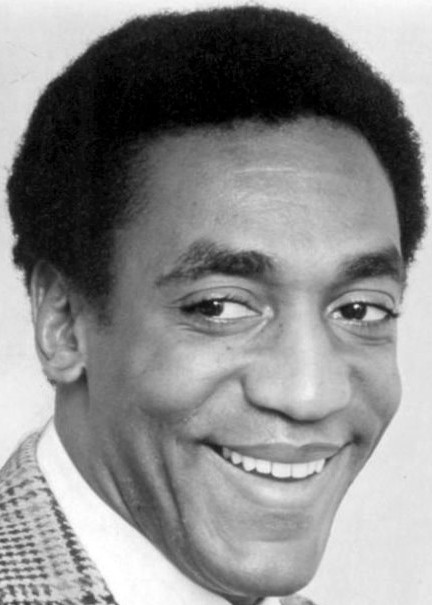
- Studio albums: 16
- Live albums: 23
- Singles: 6

American entertainer Bill Cosby released 23 albums of stand-up comedy, 16 studio albums of music, and six singles. He was known mainly for his stand-up comedy, with his first album of comedy Bill Cosby Is a Very Funny Fellow...Right! being released in 1963. He has also recorded several albums of music. Additionally, Cosby charted six singles on various Billboard charts, including "Little Ole Man (Uptight, Everything's Alright)", a number four hit on the Billboard Hot 100 in 1967.

== Stand-up albums ==
List of albums, with selected chart positions
Title	Album details	Peak chart positions	
Title	Album details	US BB	US CB
Bill Cosby Is a Very Funny Fellow...Right!	Released: 1963; Label: Warner Bros. Records; Format: LP	21	32
I Started Out as a Child	Released: 1964; Label: Warner Bros. Records; Format: LP	32	48
Why Is There Air?	Released: 1965; Label: Warner Bros. Records; Format: LP	19	19
Wonderfulness	Released: 1966; Label: Warner Bros. Records; Format: LP	7	8
Revenge	Released: 1967; Label: Warner Bros. Records; Format: LP	2	2
To Russell, My Brother, Whom I Slept With	Released: 1968; Label: Warner Bros.–Seven Arts Records; Format: LP	7	4
200 M.P.H.	Released: 1968; Label: Warner Bros.–Seven Arts Records; Format: LP	16	17
It's True! It's True!	Released: 1969; Label: Warner Bros.–Seven Arts Records; Format: LP	37	43
8:15 12:15	Released: 1969; Label: Tetragrammaton Records; Format: LP	62	55
Sports	Released: 1969; Label: Uni Records; Format: LP	—	—
Live: Madison Square Garden Center	Released: 1970; Label: Uni Records; Format: LP	165	—
When I Was a Kid	Released: 1971; Label: Uni Records; Format: LP	72	74
For Adults Only	Released: 1971; Label: Uni Records; Format: LP	181	—
Inside the Mind of Bill Cosby	Released: 1972; Label: Uni Records; Format: LP	191	—
Fat Albert	Released: 1973; Label: MCA Records; Format: LP	—	—
My Father Confused Me... What Must I Do? What Must I Do?	Released: 1977; Label: Capitol/EMI Records; Format: LP	—	—
Bill's Best Friend	Released: 1978; Label: Capitol/EMI; Format: LP	—	—
Himself	Released: 1982; Label: Motown; Format: LP; Bill Cosby: Himself video released in 1983	—	—
Hardheaded Boys	Released: 1985; Label: Nicetown Records; Format: LP	—	—
Those of You with or Without Children, You'll Understand	Released: 1986; Label: Geffen Records; Format: LP	—	—
Bill Cosby: 49	Released: 1987; Label: Format: VHS only; Recorded live at the Chicago Theatre, September, 1986	—	—
Oh, Baby!	Released: 1991; Label: Geffen Records; Format: LP	—	—
Bill Cosby: Mr. Sapolsky, with Love	Released: 1996; Label: Format: Special	—	—
Far from Finished...	Released: 2013; Label: Format: Special and album	—	—N/a
77	Unreleased Netflix special	—N/a	—N/a
"—" denotes a recording that did not chart or was not released in that territory.

=== Music albums ===
- Silver Throat: Bill Cosby Sings (1967) (No. 18 Billboard, No. 15 Cashbox)
- Bill Cosby Sings Hooray for the Salvation Army Band! (1968) (No. 74 Billboard, No. 46 Cashbox)
- Badfoot Brown & the Bunions Bradford Funeral & Marching Band (1971)
- Bill Cosby Talks to Kids About Drugs (1971)
- Charles Mingus and Friends in Concert – as master of ceremonies (Columbia, 1972)
- Bill Cosby Presents Badfoot Brown & the Bunions Bradford Funeral Marching Band (1972)
- At Last Bill Cosby Really Sings (1974)
- Bill Cosby Is Not Himself These Days (1976)
- Disco Bill (1977)
- Where You Lay Your Head (1990)
- My Appreciation (1991)
- Hello Friend: To Ennis, With Love (1997)
- Quincy Jones & Bill Cosby – The Original Jam Sessions 1969 (2004)
- Quincy Jones & Bill Cosby – The New Mixes Vol. 1 (2004)
- State of Emergency (2009)
- Keep Standing (2010)

Compilations

- The Best of Bill Cosby (1969) (No. 51 Billboard, No. 44 Cashbox)
- More of the Best of Bill Cosby (1970) (No. 80 Billboard, No. 75 Cashbox)
- Bill (1973)
- Down Under (1975)
- Cosby and the Kids/Cosby Classics (1986)
- Bill Cosby At His Best (1992)
- 20th Century Masters: The Millennium Collection: The Best of Bill Cosby (2001)
- The Bill Cosby Collection (2004)
- Icon (2011)

=== Singles ===
List of singles, with selected chart positions
Title	Year	Peak chart positions				Album
Title	Year	US	US R&B	US AC	Canada	Album
"Little Ole Man (Uptight, Everything's Alright)"	1967	4	18	—	2	Silver Throat: Bill Cosby Sings
"Hooray for the Salvation Army Band"	1967	71	—	—	—	Bill Cosby Sings Hooray for the Salvation Army Band!
"Funky North Philly"	1968	91	—	—	—	Bill Cosby Sings Hooray for the Salvation Army Band!
"Hikky Burr"	1969	—	—	—	77	—N/a
"Grover Henson Feels Forgotten"	1970	70	—	17	74	—N/a
"Yes, Yes, Yes"	1976	46	11	—	—	Bill Cosby Is Not Himself These Days
"I Luv Myself Better Than I Luv Myself"	1976	—	59	—	—	Bill Cosby Is Not Himself These Days
"—" denotes a recording that did not chart or was not released in that territory.
