= List of awards and nominations received by Bill Cosby =

Bill Cosby awards and nominations
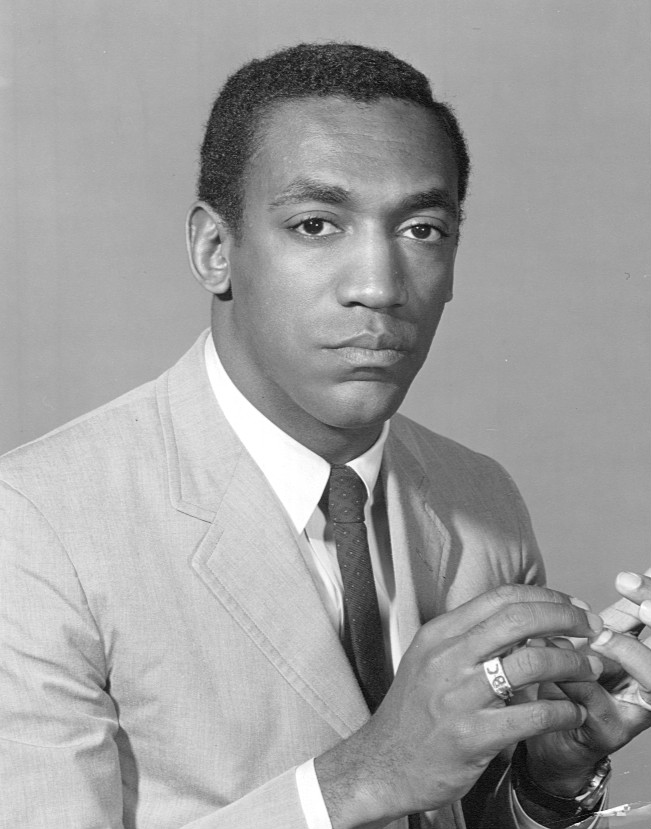
- Cosby in 1966
Awards and nominations
Award	Wins	Nominations
Primetime Emmy Award	5	9
Daytime Emmy Award	2	5
Grammy Award	8	19
Golden Globe Award	2	5

This article is a List of awards and nominations received by Bill Cosby.

Bill Cosby is an American comedian who received various awards for his work on film and television and for his comedy albums. He received 19 Grammy Award nominations winning 8 awards including six consecutive awards for Best Comedy Album from 1965 to 1970. He received another 2 Grammys for Grammy Award for Best Children's Album for Bill Cosby Talks to Kids About Drugs (1972), and The Electric Company (1973). He also received nine Primetime Emmy Award nominations, receiving three consecutive awards for his leading performance in the drama series I Spy (1966-1968) becoming the first African American actor to do so. He also won for The Bill Cosby Special (1969), and received the Bob Hope Humanitarian Award in 2003. He also was nominated for five Daytime Emmy Awards winning twice for Fat Albert and the Cosby Kids (1981), and 'Little Bill (2004). He received five Golden Globe Award nominations winning twice for Best Actor in a Comedy Series for The Cosby Show (1984, 1985).

Cosby also received numerous awards and special honors including the Presidential Medal of Freedom in 2002. However, due to the widespread allegations of sexual assault Cosby has been stripped of various honorary degrees and awards including the Kennedy Center Honors (1998, rescinded in 2018) and the Mark Twain Prize for American Humor (2009, also rescinded in 2018). In 2018, Cosby was also expelled from the Academy of Motion Picture Arts and Sciences along with Harvey Weinstein and Roman Polanski due to their breach of the academy's standards of conduct.

== Major associations ==
=== Emmy Awards ===
Year	Category	Nominated work	Result	Ref.
Primetime Emmy Awards
1966	Outstanding Actor in a Drama Series	I Spy	Won	
1967	Outstanding Actor in a Drama Series	I Spy	Won	
1968	Outstanding Actor in a Drama Series	I Spy	Won	
1969	Outstanding Variety Special	The Bill Cosby Special	Won	
1970	Outstanding Comedy Series	The Bill Cosby Show	Nominated	
1970	Outstanding New Series	The Bill Cosby Show	Nominated	
1970	Outstanding Actor in a Comedy Series	The Bill Cosby Show	Nominated	
1970	Outstanding Variety Special	The Second Bill Cosby Special	Nominated	
2003	Bob Hope Humanitarian Award		Won	
Daytime Emmy Awards
1975	Outstanding Performer in Children's Programming	Highlights of Ringling Brothers and Barnum Bailey Circus	Nominated	
1981	Outstanding Performer in Children's Programming	Fat Albert and the Cosby Kids	Won	
1986	Outstanding Children's Animated Program	Fat Albert and the Cosby Kids	Nominated	
2002	Outstanding Special Class Animated Program	Little Bill	Nominated	
2004	Outstanding Children's Animated Program	Little Bill	Won	

=== Grammy Awards ===
Year	Category	Nominated work	Result	Ref.
1964	Best Comedy Album	Bill Cosby Is a Very Funny Fellow...Right!	Nominated	
1965	Best Comedy Album	I Started Out as a Child	Won	
1966	Best Comedy Album	Why Is There Air?	Won	
1967	Best Comedy Album	Wonderfulness	Won	
1968	Best Comedy Album	Revenge	Won	
1969	Best Comedy Album	To Russell, My Brother, Whom I Slept With	Won	
1970	Best Comedy Album	Sports, a.k.a. Bill Cosby	Won	
1971	Best Comedy Album	Live: Madison Square Garden Center	Nominated	
1971	Best Spoken Word Album	Grover Henson Feels Forgotten	Nominated	
1972	Best Comedy Album	When I Was a Kid	Nominated	
1972	Best Children's Album	Bill Cosby Talks to Kids About Drugs	Won	
1973	Best Children's Album	The Electric Company	Won	
1973	Best Comedy Album	Fat Albert	Nominated	
1976	Best Comedy Album	Bill Cosby Is Not Himself These Days	Nominated	
1984	Best Comedy Album	Bill Cosby: Himself	Nominated	
1987	Best Comedy Album	Those of You with or Without Children, You'll Understand	Won	
1987	Best Spoken Word Album	Hardheaded Boys	Nominated	

=== Golden Globe Awards ===
Year	Category	Nominated work	Result	Ref.
1967	Best TV Star - Male	I Spy	Nominated	
1973	Best Actor - Musical or Comedy Series	The New Bill Cosby Show	Nominated	
1985	Best Actor - Musical or Comedy Series	The Cosby Show	Won	
1986	Best Actor - Musical or Comedy Series	The Cosby Show	Won	
1987	Best Actor - Musical or Comedy Series	The Cosby Show	Nominated	

== Honorary awards ==
- 1984: He was inducted into the Temple University Athletics Hall of Fame.
- 2002: Received the Presidential Medal of Freedom from George W. Bush
- 2002: The scholar Molefi Kete Asante included Cosby in his book The 100 Greatest African Americans.
- 2005: In a British poll broadcast on Channel 4 to find the Comedian's Comedian, he was voted among the top fifty comedy acts ever by fellow comedians and comedy insiders.
- 2010: Received the Lone Sailor Award by the United States Navy Memorial.
- 2010: Received the National Football Foundation's Gold Medal

== Honorary degrees ==
Cosby was awarded 72 honorary degrees and many other honors since 1985. 62 of these were revoked after he was accused of sexual offenses or after his conviction for sexual assault.

== Rescinded awards ==
Rescinded awards due to convictions and allegations of sexual assault:

- 2011: Received Honorary Chief Petty Officer from U.S. Navy. Revoked December 4, 2014.
- 2009: Received the Marian Anderson Award. Rescinded May 3, 2018.
- 1998: Received the Kennedy Center Honor. Rescinded May 7, 2018.
- 2009: Presented with the 12th annual Mark Twain Prize for American Humor. Rescinded May 7, 2018.
- 2002: Received the TCA Career Achievement Award. Rescinded September 25, 2018.
- May 3, 2018, Cosby was expelled as a member of the Actors Branch of the Academy of Motion Picture Arts and Sciences.
- 1982: He won the Theodore Roosevelt Award as a Member of Temple University football. Rescinded in 2018.
