= More of the Best of Bill Cosby =

Compilation album by Bill Cosby
- Released: February 1970
- Recorded: 1964–1969
- Genre: Stand-up comedy
- Length: 32:16
- Label: Warner Bros.

Bill Cosby chronology
Sports (1969)	More of the Best of Bill Cosby (1970)	Live: Madison Square Garden Center (1970)

Professional ratings
Review scores
Source	Rating
AllMusic	4.5/5 stars

More of the Best of Bill Cosby (1970) is the 13th album by Bill Cosby. It is his second compilation album containing favorites from his tenure with Warner Bros. Records, which had just been completed earlier that year. This second volume includes "The Apple", which was also included on the first volume.

== Track listing ==
=== Side 1 ===
1. Two Daughters – 5:16 (from Revenge)
2. Toss of the Coin – 2:30 (from Bill Cosby Is a Very Funny Fellow...Right!)
3. Conflict – 1:19 (from To Russell, My Brother, Whom I Slept With)
4. Dogs and Cats – 2:57 (from 200 M.P.H.)
5. Smoking – 2:50 (from Revenge)
6. Shop – 2:13 (from Why Is There Air?)

=== Side 2 ===
1. Karate – 5:00 (from ...Right!)
2. Oops – 1:48 (from I Started Out as a Child)
3. The Apple – 1:43 (from To Russell, My Brother...)
4. Hofstra – 8:00 (from Why Is There Air?)
