= The Best of Bill Cosby =

Greatest hits album by Bill Cosby
- Released: August 1969
- Recorded: 1964–1969
- Genre: Stand-up comedy
- Length: 37:01
- Label: Warner Bros.

Bill Cosby chronology
8:15 12:15 (1969)	The Best of Bill Cosby (1969)	Sports (1969)

Professional ratings
Review scores
Source	Rating
Allmusic	5/5 stars

The Best of Bill Cosby (1969) is a comedy compilation album by Bill Cosby. It is his 10th comedy album and 12th overall release, including two music albums he had recorded to that point.

The album, Cosby's first compilation, presents routines taken from the comedy albums he recorded during his tenure with Warner Bros. Records, which had just been completed earlier that year. The liner notes were by David Ossman of the comedy group The Firesign Theatre.

== Track listing ==
Some of the track titles on this album differ from those on the albums from which they were taken. Where applicable, the original titles are shown in parentheses.

=== Side 1 ===
1. Noah: Right! – 2:05 (from Bill Cosby Is a Very Funny Fellow...Right!)
2. Noah: And the Neighbor – 1:43 (from ...Right!)
3. Noah: Me and You, Lord – 3:11 (from ...Right!)
4. Revenge – 5:58 (from Revenge)
5. The Lone Ranger – 0:55 (from I Started Out as a Child)
6. Old Weird Harold (9th Street Bridge) – 5:12 (from Revenge)

=== Side 2 ===
1. Driving in San Francisco – 3:45 (from Why Is There Air?)
2. The Apple – 1:43 (from To Russell, My Brother, Whom I Slept With)
3. Babies (Baby) – 3:49 (from Why Is There Air?)
4. The Water Bottle – 0:58 (from I Started Out...)
5. Street Football – 1:17 (from I Started Out...)
6. Fat Albert (Buck, Buck) – 9:05 (from Revenge)

"The Lone Ranger", as presented on this album, is a truncated (shortened) version of the original recording.

The cassette tape release of the album reverses Sides 1 and 2 of the LP in order to sequence the longer side first.

=== British track listing ===
In 1967, an album of the same title was released in England by Warner Brothers (K46002), but with a different track listing and different cover art (it used the same photo as the cover of Wonderfulness for its front cover, and the photo and liner notes of Why Is There Air? for its back cover).

==== Side One ====
1. Medic (from I Started Out...)
2. Go Carts (from Wonderfulness)
3. $75 Car (from Why Is There Air?)
4. Noah: Right!
5. Noah: And the Neighbor
6. Noah: Me and You, Lord

==== Side Two ====
1. Tonsils (from Wonderfulness)
2. Kindergarten (from Why Is There Air?)
3. The Playground (from Wonderfulness)

== Certifications ==
Region	Certification	Certified units/sales
Australia (ARIA)	2× Platinum	140,000^{^}
^{^} Shipments figures based on certification alone.
