= Bill Cosby Is Not Himself These Days =

Bill Cosby Is Not Himself These Days - Rat Own, Rat Own, Rat Own

Studio album by Bill Cosby
- Released: June 1976
- Recorded: 1976
- Genre: Comedy
- Length: 33:22
- Label: Capitol/EMI Records
- Producer: Stu Gardner

Bill Cosby chronology
Down Under (1975)	Bill Cosby Is Not Himself These Days - Rat Own, Rat Own, Rat Own (1976)	Disco Bill (1977)

Professional ratings
Review scores
Source	Rating
AllMusic	link

Bill Cosby Is Not Himself These Days - Rat Own, Rat Own, Rat Own (1976) is a musical comedy album by Bill Cosby. He parodies various rhythm and blues artists including James Brown and Barry White. The songs were written with producer and keyboardist Stu Gardner. This is also his first album on Capitol Records, his fourth musical album release overall (not counting the 1971 band project Badfoot Brown & the Bunions Bradford Funeral & Marching Band and its 1972 sequel).

== Background ==
For nine years, Cosby released at least an album a year, starting in 1964. After a three-year hiatus, this was his first comedy album since 1973's Fat Albert, albeit in musical form, and he wouldn't return to a full-fledged stand-up album again until 1977's My Father Confused Me... What Must I Do? What Must I Do?.

The first single, "Yes, Yes, Yes", became one of Cosby's biggest charted hits after "Little Ole Man (Uptight, Everything's Alright)", reaching number 46 on the Billboard Hot 100 and number 11 on the Billboard rhythm and blues singles chart. The song spoofed Barry White's deep-voiced spoken word monologues; in particular, White's catchphrase "right on" is mondegreened as "rat own, rat own," giving the album its subtitle. "Ben" was sampled by Jurassic 5 on their 2002 song "After School Special".

== Track listing ==
1. "Yes, Yes, Yes" – (Cosby/Gardner) – 3:21
2. "Chick on the Side" – (Cosby/Gardner) – 3:20
3. "Shift Down" – (Cosby/Gardner/Lansbury) – 4:07
4. "I Luv Myself Better Than I Luv Myself" – (Cosby/Gardner) – 6:00
5. "Do It to Me" – (Cosby/Gardner) – 3:22
6. "Ben" – (Cosby/Gardner) – 3:22
7. "You're Driving Me Crazy" – (Cosby/Gardner) – 3:59
8. "Garbage Truck Lady" – (Cosby/Gardner) – 2:38
9. "Luv Is" – (Cosby/Gardner) – 3:13

== Personnel ==
- Ollie E. Brown – drums
- Bill Cosby – vocals
- Tony Drake – guitar
- Larry Farrow – keyboards
- Stu Gardner – piano
- Al Hall, Jr. – trombone
- Fred Jackson, Jr. – saxophone
- Melvin Moore – trumpet
- Nate Neblett – drums
- Ray Parker Jr. – bass, guitar
- Doug Richardson – flute, saxophone
- David Sheilds – bass
- Wah Wah Watson – guitar
