= It's True =

It's True may refer to:

- "It's True", a song by Backstreet Boys on their album Black & Blue
- "It's True", a song by BJ the Chicago Kid from his album The M.A.F.E. Project
- "It's True", a song by Salem Al Fakir from his album This Is Who I Am
  - "It's True", a relaunch of the earlier song credited to Axwell & Sebastian Ingrosso vs. Salem Al Fakir

== See also ==
- It's True! It's True!, 1969 album by Bill Cosby
