= Strawberry Moon =

Strawberry Moon may refer to:

- Strawberry Moon (album), a 1987 album by Grover Washington Jr.
- "Strawberry Moon" (song), a 2021 song by IU
- "Strawberry Moon", a 2021 song by Twice from Kura Kura (Twice song)

== See also ==
- Full moon
