= Fat Albert (disambiguation) =

Fat Albert may refer to:

- Fat Albert, a character created by comedian Bill Cosby
  - Fat Albert and the Cosby Kids, an animated cartoon show featuring this character
  - Fat Albert (album), a 1973 comedy album by Bill Cosby
  - Fat Albert (film), a 2004 live-action film
- a Lockheed C-130 Hercules military transport aircraft used by the Blue Angels flight demonstration team
- Boeing 737, the older models were often referred to as "Fat Albert" due to its three-by-three fuselage width and short body
- Fat Albert, nickname of a Tethered Aerostat Radar System floating above Cudjoe Key, Florida
- Fat Albert, name for an Alaskan Polar bear that is likely the largest Polar Bear weighing in at about 1500lbs (~680kg)
