= My Father Confused Me... What Must I Do? What Must I Do? =

Live album by Bill Cosby
- Released: October 1977
- Recorded: 1977
- Genre: Comedy
- Label: Capitol/EMI Records
- Producer: Stu Gardner

Bill Cosby chronology
Disco Bill (1976)	My Father Confused Me... What Must I Do? What Must I Do? (1977)	Bill's Best Friend (1978)

My Father Confused Me... What Must I Do? What Must I Do? is the 16th comedy album by Bill Cosby, originally released on vinyl in 1977. It was re-released on CD as the first disc of The Bill Cosby Collection, the second disc being Cosby's follow up comedy record, 1978's Bill's Best Friend. Much of the material was recycled in the 1983 performance film Bill Cosby: Himself (and the accompanying soundtrack album).

Professional ratings
Review scores
Source	Rating
Allmusic	link

== Track listing ==
1. "The English Language" - 3:35
2. "Henry Kissinger" - 0:42
3. "UFO" - 1:38
4. "My Father Confused Me" - 2:11
5. "The Glazed Donut Monster" - 2:10
6. "Mothers Enunciate" - 1:33
7. "The FCC and Mothers" - 2:57
8. "Mothers Will Hit You for Nothing" - 1:23
9. "Fathers Are the Funniest People" - 2:26
10. "Marriage and Duties" - 1:45
11. "New Husbands Kill Things" - 3:00
12. "The Lizard and the Mouse" - 2:54
13. "Dudes on Dope" - 2:39
14. "The Dentist" - 8:59

== Charts ==
Chart (1977)	Peak position
Australian (Kent Music Report)	51
