= Then and Now (Grover Washington Jr. album) =

Studio album by Grover Washington Jr.
- Released: 1988
- Studio: Sigma Sound, Philadelphia, Pennsylvania
- Genre: Jazz fusion, Smooth jazz
- Length: 56:34
- Label: Columbia CK 44256
- Producer: Grover Washington Jr.

Grover Washington Jr. chronology
Strawberry Moon (1987)	Then and Now (1988)	Time Out of Mind (1989)

Professional ratings
Review scores
Source	Rating
AllMusic	4/5 stars
The Penguin Guide to Jazz Recordings	2.5/4 stars
The Rolling Stone Jazz & Blues Album Guide	2/5 stars

Then and Now is a studio album by American jazz saxophonist Grover Washington Jr. The record was released in 1988 through Columbia Records.

== Reception ==
Scott Yanow of AllMusic wrote: "This is one of Grover Washington Jr.'s occasional strays away from R&B-oriented jazz to play in a more straightahead setting. Switching between soprano, alto and tenor, Grover is accompanied by either Tommy Flanagan or Herbie Hancock on piano during five of the eight selections and he performs such numbers as Ron Carter's 'Blues for D.P.', 'Stolen Moments' and 'Stella by Starlight' with swing and taste. Tenor-saxophonist Igor Butman also helps out on three songs. Worth acquiring".

== Track listing ==
1. "Blues for D. P." (Ron Carter) – 8:30
2. "Just Enough" (Herbie Hancock) – 5:44
3. "French Connections" (Igor Butman) – 7:00
4. "Something Borrowed, Something Blue" (Tommy Flanagan) – 8:00
5. "Lullaby for Shana Bly" (Washington) – 6:12
6. "Stolen Moments" (Oliver Nelson) – 7:25
7. "In a Sentimental Mood" (Duke Ellington, Manny Kurtz, Irving Mills) – 7:03
8. "Stella by Starlight" (Ned Washington, Victor Young) – 6:40

== Personnel ==
- Grover Washington Jr. – soprano saxophone (1, 6, 8), tenor saxophone (2–5), alto saxophone (7)
- Igor Butman – tenor saxophone (3, 6, 8)
- Herbie Hancock – grand piano (1, 2, 5)
- James "Sid" Simmons – grand piano (3, 6, 8)
- Tommy Flanagan – grand piano (4, 7)
- Richard Lee Steacker – guitars (3, 6)
- Ron Carter – double bass (1, 2, 5)
- Gerald Veasley – 5-string electric bass (3, 6, 8)
- Grady Tate – drums (1)
- Marvin "Smitty" Smith – drums (1, 2, 5)
- Darryl Washington – drums (3, 6, 8)
- Miguel Fuentes – percussion (3, 6, 8)

== Production ==
- Grover Washington Jr. – producer, mixing
- Fernando Kral – recording
- Joe Tarsia – recording, mixing
- Tony Maserati – assistant engineer
- Adam Silverman – assistant engineer
- Peter Humphreys – mastering
- Nimitr Sarkananda – mastering
- Masterworks Recording, Inc. (Philadelphia, Pennsylvania) – mastering location
- Paul Silverthorn – production coordinator
- Rico Lins – art direction, design
- David Katzenstein – photography
