= Igor Butman =

Russian musician (born 1961)

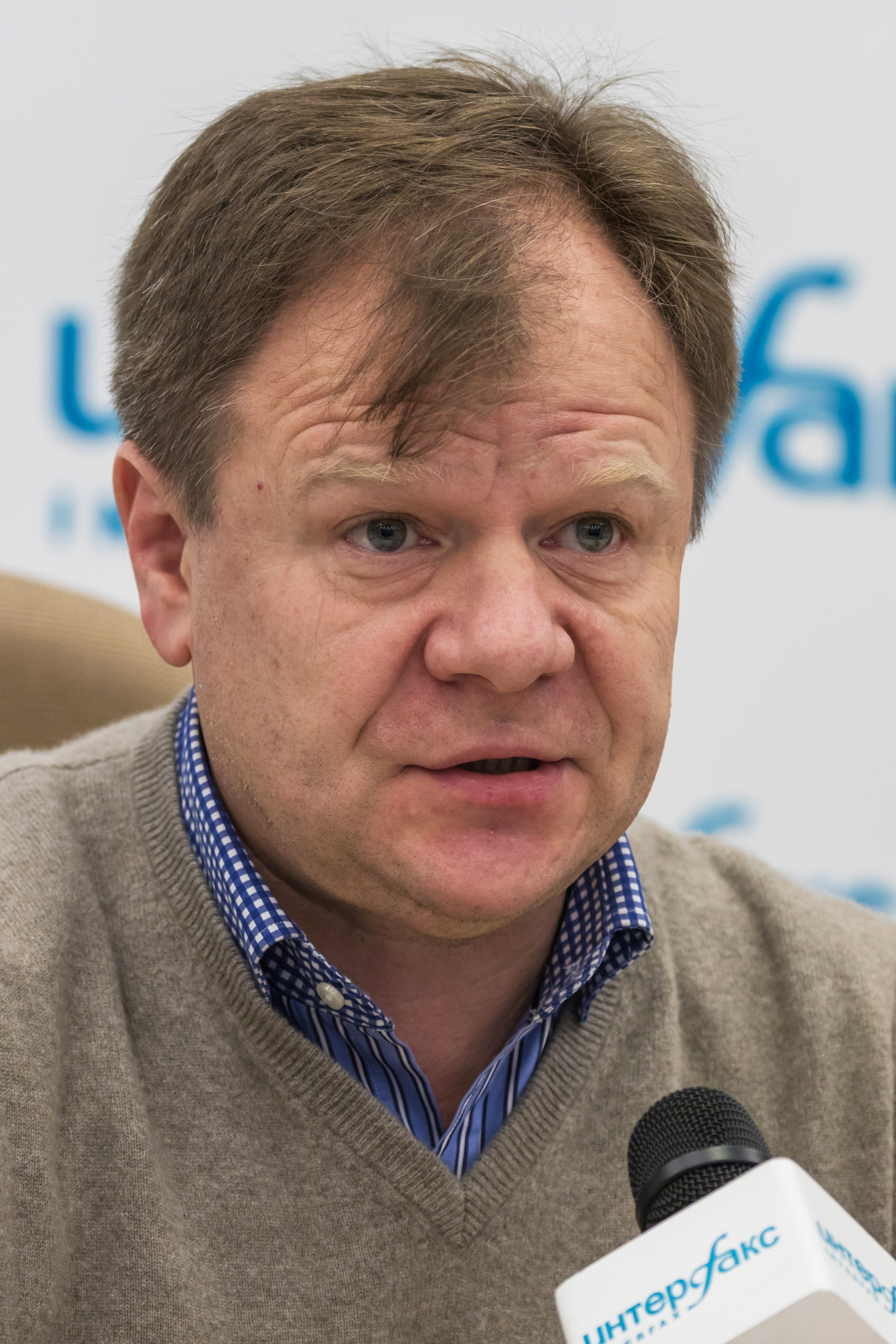
- Igor Butman in 2016

Background information
- Born: 27 October 1961 (age 65)
- Origin: Leningrad, Soviet Union
- Genres: Jazz, classical
- Occupations: Saxophonist, composer, bandleader
- Instruments: Tenor saxophone, soprano saxophone
- Years active: 1976–present
- Label: Butman Music
- Website: igorbutman.com

Igor Mikhailovich Butman PAR (Russian: Игорь Михайлович Бутман; born 27 October 1961) is a Russian jazz saxophonist born in Leningrad, Soviet Union (now St. Petersburg, Russia) in 1961. Butman holds dual citizenship for both the United States and Russian Federation. He is considered to be a virtuoso saxophonist, and a skilled bandleader.

American saxophonist Grover Washington, Jr. was instrumental in introducing Igor Butman to American audiences by featuring the Russian saxophonist on his 1988 album, Then and Now. American trumpet player Wynton Marsalis has also been a strong champion of Igor Butman. Bill Clinton has called Butman his "favorite living saxophone player".

== Early life ==
Igor Butman was born in Leningrad, USSR on 27 October 1961 to a Jewish father and a Russian mother. His brother is Oleg Butman, a well known jazz drummer. In 1976 he entered the Rimsky-Korsakov College of Music. In 1977, he decided to switch from the classical clarinet to the jazz saxophone. Besides being taught by the musician Gennady Golstein, he took informal lessons from nightly broadcasts of jazz from 11:15 pm to midnight on Voice of America.

== Career ==
In 1983, Butman played in Oleg Lundstrem's big band. In 1984, he was invited by Nick Levinovsky to join the jazz group "Allegro" and played with them for three years.

=== Move to the United States ===
After Butman emigrated to America in 1987, he went on to major in Performance and Composition at Berklee College of Music in Massachusetts. While still in the U.S.S.R., Butman was invited to play with touring American musicians, including Dave Brubeck, Chick Corea, Pat Metheny, Gary Burton, Louis Bellson and Grover Washington Jr. Butman appeared as Grover's special guest in concerts at Chautauqua, New York, the Berklee Center in Boston and at Great Woods Center in Mansfield, Massachusetts. He is featured on Grover Washington Jr.'s Columbia release Then and Now (1988) soloing on "Stolen Moments", "Stella By Starlight" and Butman's own composition "French Connections".

In Boston, Butman led his own group with Rachel Z. at Boston's leading Jazz club, The Regattabar, and has been featured soloist with the Billy Taylor Quartet, the Walter Davis Jr. Quartet and the Monty Alexander Quintet. He appeared on "The Today Show", "Good Morning America" and numerous other international programs. Moving to New York in 1989, Butman worked with The Lionel Hampton Orchestra. In 1992, Butman recorded with actor/musician Michael Moriarty's Quintet the album Live at the Fat Tuesday's on DRG Records. In 1993, he released his solo album Falling Out mostly with his own compositions, which featured Eddie Gomez on bass, Lyle Mays on piano and Marvin "Smitty" Smith on drums. Next year Butman collaborated with Partners in Time, joined by Gary Burton, in the recording of their album Equinost (Intersound).

When Wynton Marsalis performed in Russia in 1998, he invited Butman to be a guest soloist with the Lincoln Center Jazz Orchestra. In 1999, when the Igor Butman Big Band was formed Marsalis was a featured guest with them at Le Club. On 18 and 20 September 2003 Jazz at Lincoln Center opened its 2003–04 season with a special collaboration between the renowned Lincoln Center Jazz Orchestra and the Igor Butman Big Band. Two big bands on one stage occasionally played at the same time, but more often passed the music back and forth in an interview with Jazz Times magazine, Marsalis said of Butman, "I love Igor's Butman playing and I love him personally. He has a great feeling for the music and for people and he's phenomenal musician. Igor Butman is my main man!"

=== Triumph of Jazz and Le Club ===
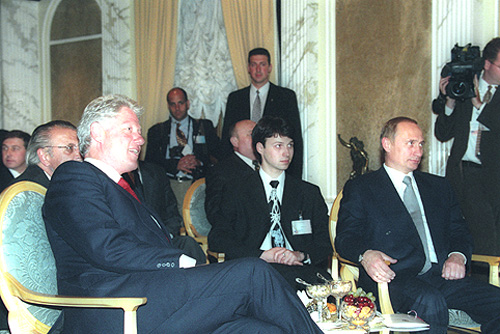
Vladimir Putin and Bill Clinton at a concert of jazz orchestras directed by Oleg Lundstrem and Igor Butman, Moscow, June 2000

One of the Butman's accomplishments as a producer is "The Triumph of Jazz", a festival which takes place annually in the biggest concert halls of Russia. Participants of the fest have included TAKE 6, Elvin Jones, Gary Burton, Gino Vanelli, Toots Thielemans, Larry Corryell, Dee Dee Bridgewater, Joey DeFrancesco etc. The latest festival took place at Svetlanovsky Hall of Moscow International Performing Arts Center and featured Ahmad Jamal Trio, Christian Scott Quintet, Igor Butman Big Band, Andrey Kondakov and Brazil All Stars.

Butman used to be an artistic director of a Moscow jazz venue Le Club since its opening in 1998 until its closure in 2006. Le Club was included in Downbeat's Top100 jazz venues of the world. At the club Butman appeared every Monday with his Big Band and presented the first time in Russia such outstanding musicians as Ray Brown, Wynton Marsalis. Kenny Garrett, Randy Brecker, Al di Meola, Billy Cobham, Take 6 and many others. In 2006 the jazzman set up a new club in Moscow - Igor Butman Club at Chistie Prudi, a legal successor of Le Club, which has become city's jazz epicenter. In 2011 Butman opened his second club at Sokol.

=== 2003–present ===
In June 2003 Butman's solo album "Prophecy" was released by Universal Music Russia. The album's presentation took place at Birdland jazz club in New York. "Prophecy" received an enthusiastic welcome by both Russian and US press. In April 2003, Butman performed as a special guest with Ray Charles, George Benson and Al Jarreau bands. He received the 2004 State Prize of the Russian Federation. In 2006 Butman started recording his album "Magic Land" based on music from Soviet cartoons and movies featuring Chick Corea on piano, John Patitucci on bass, Randy Brecker on trumpet, Stefon Harris on vibraphone, and Jack DeJohnette on drums.

At the beginning of December 2007 Sony BMG Russia released "Magic Land" in Russia and the USA. In the summer of 2008 the CD was released throughout the world. In April 2009 National Federation of Phonogram Producers awarded Igor Butman with a golden disk for selling more than 15 thousand copies of "Magic Land" in Russia!

In February 2009, the Igor Butman Big Band toured the United States with Yuri Bashmet, Moscow Soloists Chamber Orchestra and Igor Raykhelson. The tour included performances in Seattle (Symphony Hall), LA (Wilshire Theatre), San Francisco (Palace of Fine Arts), Cleveland (Severance Hall), Washington (Strathmore Hall), Boston (BSO Hall), New York (Avery Fisher Hall of Lincoln Center) and Chicago (Orchestra Hall of Symphony Center).

In June 2009 Butman launched his own label called Butman Music. In the very beginning he marked the main goals for label to achieve: propaganda of Russian jazz music overseas and its integration in the world musical landscape. The company has already released nine albums, among them are "Sheherazade's Tales" by Igor Butman Orchestra (feat. Peter Bernstein, Sean Jones, James Burton and Kathy Jenkins), and "Vive L’Amour" by saxophonist Nick Vintskevich and his band (feat. Eve Cornelius, JD Walter and Kim Nazarian). Among the releases planned for 2012–2013 by Butman Music are "Igor Butman and friends" recorded with Bill Evans, Michael Brecker, Carla Cook, and Kevin Mahogany, "Conciliation" by Ivan Farmakovsky, Jack Dejohnette, and Christian McBride, and reissue of "Nostalgia" by Igor Butman.

On 27 October 2011 Butman's 50th anniversary concert featuring Wynton Marsalis, Natalie Cole, Billy Cobham and Christian McBride took place at 6000-seated Kremlin Palace in Moscow, the biggest venue of the country, and became one of the most important events in the history of Russian jazz, according to mass media. Next day on 28 October 2011 Butman was given a rank of People's Artist of Russian Federation for outstanding services to Russian music by the decree of Russian President Dmitry Medvedev.

Butman has performed at every Olympic Games starting with Athens '2004 and he was among those who ensured Russian victory in running for the capital of Winter Games in 2014. Butman runs international Sochi Jazz festival which is held annually in Sochi.

In 2016, with the support of Chelyabinsk region Governor Boris Dubrovsky, he founded Russia's only jazz Festival of musical humor. The festival is held annually in Chelyabinsk and other cities of the Chelyabinsk region. The participants of the festival were musicians from Russia, USA, UK, France, Italy, Denmark, etc. Among the regular participants of the festival are the Moscow jazz orchestra under direction of Igor Butman and jazz ensemble Uralskiy Dixieland.

== Television ==
He appeared in the third season of ice show contest Ice Age.

== Political views ==
Butman joined the Russian political party United Russia in 2008 and became a member of its high council.

While a naturalized US citizen, Butman's membership in the Supreme Council of the "United Russia" ruling party has faced controversy in the media over Alexei Navalny's publications. Alexei Navalny, is a well known blogger in Russia and a prominent critic of government corruption at the highest levels, even including Vladimir Putin. On 8 August 2015, Navalny mocked current ardent pro-Kremlin "patriots" that hold dual citizenship and suggested that Butman pledged an Oath of Allegiance to the United States that renounced his faithfulness to Russia and promised to take up arms to fight alongside the United States.

On 30 August 2015, Igor Butman told reporters at a press-conference that he received a letter from the U.S. State Department asking him not to attend a jazz festival in the Crimean city of Koktebel because the Crimean peninsula was/is still currently under US and European sanctions. He performed anyway. He said he wrote a letter to U.S. President Barack Obama calling Ukraine's officials intentions to ban artists who perform in Crimea from entering Ukraine for five years—"improper." Now Butman may face punishment and/or fines from the US Government for breaching the sanction restrictions and doing business in Crimea.

In an interview with Komsomolskaya Pravda, Butman alleged that he had been "informed by personal friends in American governmental structures" that the Department of State was investigating whether Butman could be stripped of his citizenship, speculating that State Department officials proposed that Butman's political activities could be seen as aiding forces hostile to the United States (a condition under which acquired citizenship can be legally revoked).

=== Support of the Annexation of Crimea ===
In March 2014, Butman joined a host of other Russian arts and cultural figures in signing an open letter of support for Russia's military intervention in Ukraine and the Annexation of Crimea by the Russian Federation.

The letter was posted on the website of Russia's culture ministry on 12 March 2014. In the letter signatories stated that they "firmly state support for the position of the president of the Russian Federation" in the region.

When translated from Russian to English the letter is titled "Russian cultural figures—in support of the position of the President of the Russian Federation and Crimea." As of 9/22/2015 it has 511 signatories and contains the following contents:

"In the days when the fate of our countrymen in Crimea is being decided, Russian cultural figures cannot remain indifferent cold-hearted observers. Our shared history and shared roots, our culture and its spiritual sources of our fundamental values and language have always united us. We want the commonality of our peoples and our cultures to have a strong future. That is why we firmly declare and reiterate support for the position of President of the Russian Federation in regards to Ukraine and Crimea."

The New York Times reported that Russian artists may have been pushed by the Russian government to endorse the annexation of Crimea.

In 2014, after Ukrainian public outcry, the Ukrainian Ministry of Culture blacklisted Butman, among other key cultural figures in Ukraine and Russia, from performing in Ukraine.

=== Support of the Russia's invasion of Ukraine ===
In 2022, he supported Russia's attack on Ukraine and the annexation of the occupied territories of Ukraine.

On 7 January 2023, against the background of Russia's invasion of Ukraine, he was included in the sanctions list of Ukraine "for visiting the occupied territories after the invasion, participating in propaganda concerts, public support for the war and Putin's regime". Earlier, Butman was included in the FBC's list of corrupt officials and warmongers for public support for the actions of the Russian army in Ukraine.

On 3 February 2023, he was included in the sanctions list of Canada as involved in the dissemination of Russian misinformation and propaganda.
