= Bill's Best Friend =

Live album by Bill Cosby
- Released: February 1978
- Recorded: 1977
- Genre: Comedy
- Label: Capitol/EMI
- Producer: Stu Gardner

Bill Cosby chronology
My Father Confused Me... What Must I Do? What Must I Do? (1977)	Bill's Best Friend (1978)	Himself (1982)

Professional ratings
Review scores
Source	Rating
Allmusic	3/5 stars

Bill's Best Friend is the 17th comedy album by Bill Cosby. Much of the material was recycled in the film and accompanying album Himself. The story of the car with the airplane engine was previously attributed to Fat Albert, while on this album the owner is referred to as "Charlie Waynes". The car in the Fat Albert sketch was a 1941 Mercury. The car on this album is a 1942 DeSoto. This album and his previous Capitol Records album were repackaged in Australia as a two-CD set in 1992 called The Bill Cosby Collection.

== Track listing ==
1. Roland and the Rollercoaster - 9:12
2. Puberty - 3:37
3. People Who Drink - 3:18
4. Frisbies - 1:16
5. Chinese Mustard - 2:26
6. Famous People - 1:08
7. Let's Make a Deal - 1:12
8. Cars - 5:29
9. Illegal Drugs - 6:03
10. Parents and Grandparents 5:38
