= Time Out of Mind (Grover Washington Jr. album) =

Studio album by Grover Washington Jr.
- Released: 1989
- Studios: Sigma Sound, Philadelphia, Pennsylvania; The Sound Spa, Chester, Pennsylvania
- Genres: Jazz, R&B
- Length: 55:48
- Label: Columbia C 45253
- Producers: Grover Washington Jr.; Ronnie Foster; Donald Robinson

Grover Washington Jr. chronology
Then and Now (1988)	Time Out of Mind (1989)	Next Exit (1992)

Time Out of Mind is a studio album by American jazz musician Grover Washington Jr. The album was recorded in Philadelphia with a large band and released in 1989 via Columbia label. Phyllis Hyman was invited as a guest artist.

== Reception ==
Professional ratings
Review scores
Source	Rating
AllMusic	2.5/5 stars
The Penguin Guide to Jazz Recordings	2/4 stars
The Rolling Stone Jazz & Blues Album Guide	2/5 stars

Scott Yanow of AllMusic commented: "One of the most electrifieds of Grover Washington, Jr.'s albums, this Columbia set features the popular saxophonist (who plays soprano, alto and tenor) joined by oversized rhythm sections and plenty of keyboards on a variety of funky and danceable material. Not one of Washington's more essential releases (his Columbias overall have not been that memorable), the pacesetter among r&bish saxmen is actually in fine form; if only the material were better".

== Track listing ==
No.	Title	Writer(s)	Length
1.	"Jamaica"	Ronnie Foster	4:43
2.	"Gramercy Park"	Damon Duewhite, Grover Washington, Jr., James McBride	3:57
3.	"Sacred Kind of Love"	Sami McKinney, KC Porter, Karin Rybar	5:41
4.	"Brand New Age"	Dave Appell	5:22
5.	"Fly Away"	Stefan Benz, Gijs de Lange, Louie Lasky, Paul Strand	5:32
6.	"Don't Take Your Love from Me"	Joyce Stovall	4:29
7.	"Time Out of Mind"	Walter Becker, Donald Fagen	5:05
8.	"Split Second (Act II, the Bar Scene)"	Grover Washington, Jr.	4:30
9.	"Nice 'N' Easy"	Donald Robinson	6:04
10.	"Unspoken Love"	Gerald Veasley	5:10
11.	"Protect the Dream"	Grover Washington, Jr.	5:57
Total length:			55:48

== Personnel ==
- Grover Washington Jr. – baritone saxophone (1), tenor saxophone (1, 2, 4, 6, 7), horn section (2, 7), alto saxophone (3, 4, 10, 11), soprano saxophone (5, 8, 9), arrangements (8, 11)
- Ronnie Foster – all other instruments (1), arrangements (1)
- Bill Jolly – electric piano (2, 4, 7), arrangements (2, 4–7, 11), all other instruments (5, 6), synthesizer programming (5, 6), sequencing (5, 6), BGV arrangements and conductor (5), keyboards (11)
- Philip Woo – keyboards (2), synthesizers (2, 4, 7)
- Jim Salamone – keyboard and synthesizer programming (2, 10, 11), programming (2, 3, 5, 6, 9, 10), sequencing (2, 11), drums (2, 3, 5, 6, 9–11), percussion (2, 3, 5, 6, 9–11)
- Donald Robinson – keyboards (3, 9), arrangements (3, 9)
- James "Sid" Simmons – keyboards (8)
- Randy Bowland – guitars (3, 9)
- Richard Lee Steacker – guitars (4, 7, 8, 11)
- Gerald Veasley – bass (2–5, 7–11), sequencing (10), arrangements (10)
- Darryl Washington – drums (4, 7, 8)
- Daryl Burgee – percussion (3, 9)
- Miguel Fuentes – congas (4, 7, 8), percussion (4, 7, 8)
- Leonard Gibbs – congas (8)
- Phyllis Hyman – vocals (3)
- Tracy Alston – backing vocals (5, 7)
- Spencer Harrison – backing vocals (5, 7)
- Paula Holloway – backing vocals (5, 7)
- Lawrence Newton – backing vocals (5)

== Production ==
- George Butler – executive producer
- Grover Washington Jr. – producer (1, 2, 4–8, 10, 11), mixing (1–8, 10, 11)
- Ronnie Foster – co-producer (1), mixing (1)
- Donald Robinson – producer (3, 9), mixing (9)
- Calvin Harris – pre-production engineer (1)
- Peter Humphreys – recording engineer (1, 2, 4, 5, 7, 8, 10, 11), mixing (1–8, 10, 11)
- Al Alberts Jr. – recording engineer (3, 9)
- Scott MacMinn – recording engineer (6)
- Sal Viarellie – assistant engineer (1, 2, 4–8, 10, 11)
- Carl Angstadt – assistant engineer (3, 9)
- Nimitr Sarkananda – mastering at Masterwork Recording, Inc. (Philadelphia, Pennsylvania)
- Paul Silverthorn – production coordinator (3, 9)
- Eileen Whelihan – production coordinator (3, 9)
- Christopher Austopchuk – art direction
- Chip Simons – photography
- David Carrington – hair, make-up
