= Uralskiy Dixieland =

Russian jazz band

Uralskiy Dixieland Уральский диксиленд
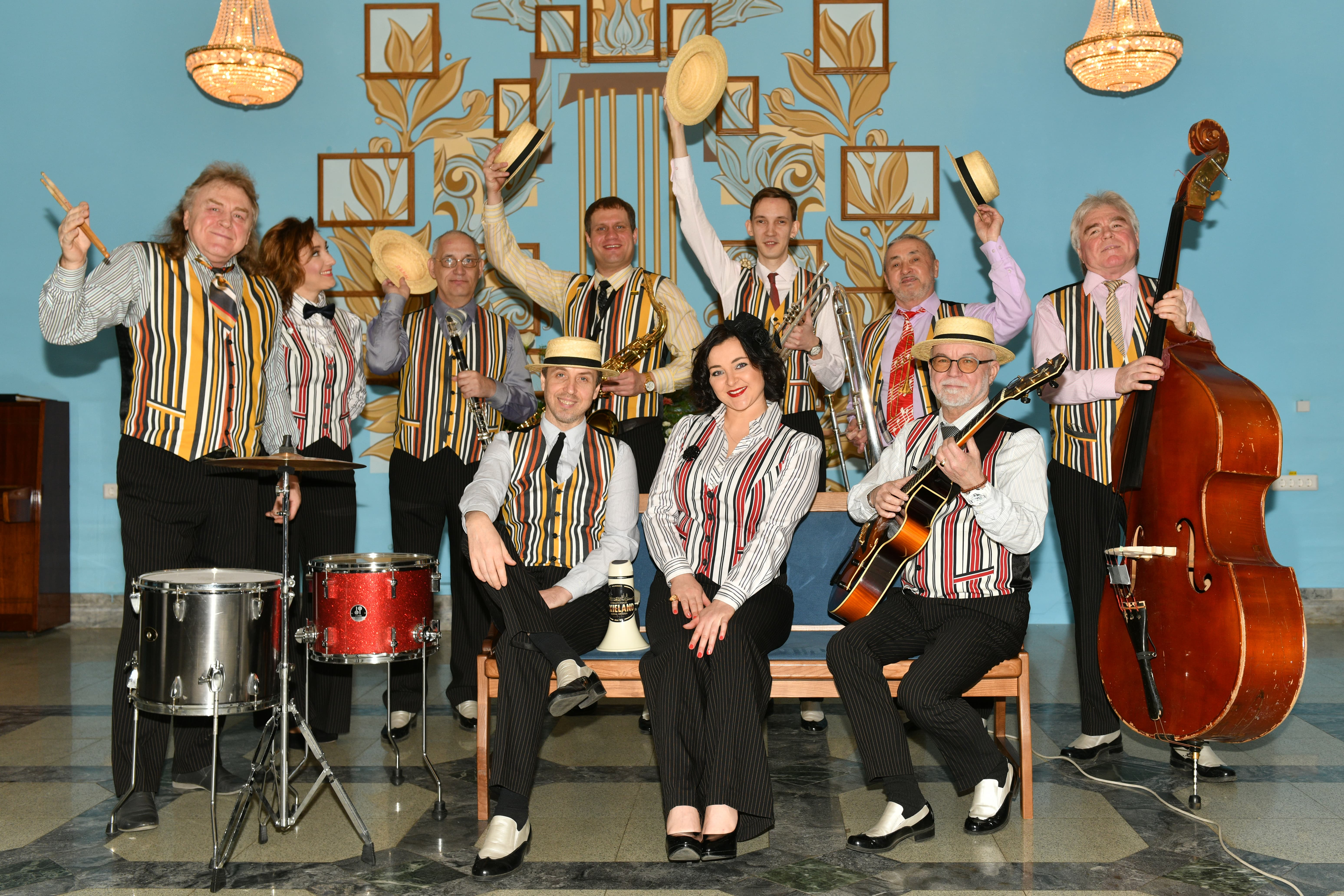

Background information
- Origin: Chelyabinsk, Russia
- Genres: Traditional jazz, Dixieland
- Years active: 1969–present
- Website: Uralskiy Dixieland

Uralskiy Dixieland is the oldest traditional jazz band in Russia. The band was formed in Chelyabinsk in 1969 under the aegis of the regional Philharmonic under the leadership of jazz musician and trumpeter Igor Bourco. Over the years, the band has performed throughout Russia, former USSR, and most European countries. Uralskiy Dixieland is the winner of the All-Union Contest of Variety Artists (Moscow, 1979) and international jazz festivals in Tbilisi (1978), Moscow (1984), Baku (1985), etc.

== International tours ==
In 1984, after their performance in the German Democratic Republic, Uralskiy Dixieland entered the international arena and was well received by the audience. The band took part in an international TV music program in Potsdam — Rund – and was the winner of the International Dixieland Festival in Dresden. The band was highly acclaimed by GDR magazine: “Following the brilliant success of Leningrad Dixieland in 1979, 1980, and 1985, another jazz band from the Soviet Union — Uralskiy Dixieland from Chelyabinsk — became a major crowd-puller at the XVI International Dixieland Festival in Dresden.” In 1986, an LP with select records of the performances at the XV and XVI International Dixieland Festivals in Dresden was released in the German Democratic Republic. Along with the bands from Scotland, Switzerland, the GDR, Czechoslovakia, Sweden, Italy, Yugoslavia, and Denmark, the LP included two Soviet bands — Leningrad Dixieland and Uralskiy Dixieland.

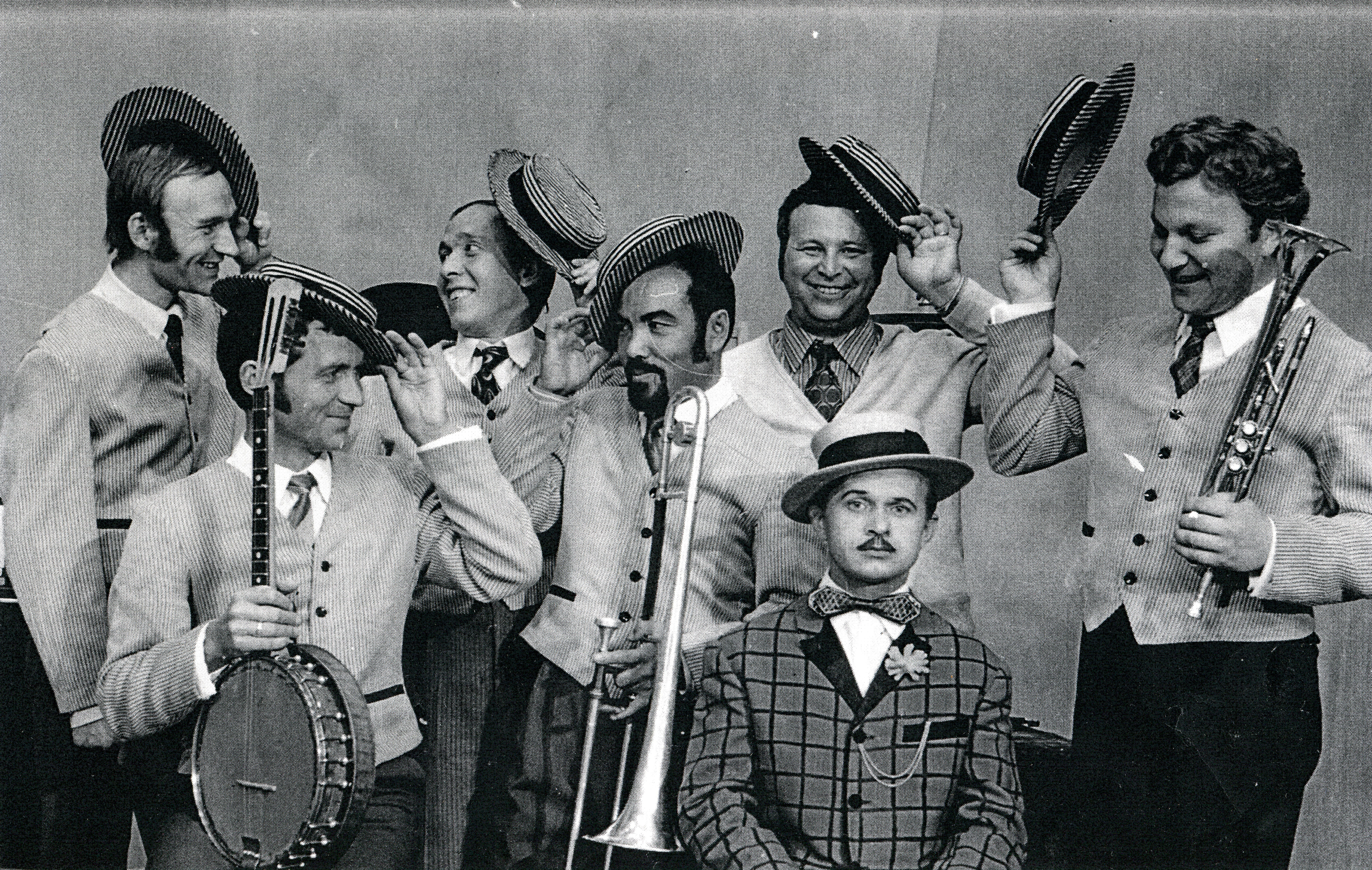
Uralskiy Dixieland, Chelyabinsk, Russia, 1970s

Subsequently, Uralskiy Dixieland was also the winner and a participant of the international jazz festivals in Dresden (1984, 1990, 1999) and such prestigious western jazz forums as North Sea Jazz Festival in the Netherlands, Brecon Jazz Festival in the United Kingdom, and others. The tour map of the band from 1989 to 2005 covered virtually the entire Europe, including the Netherlands, Belgium, France, (Germany), Sweden, England, Ireland, Denmark, Scotland, Poland, Czechoslovakia, Yugoslavia, the Isle of Man and Israel.

In 2017, the band has performed with great success at the International dixieland festival in Dresden again and became the only Russian delegate of 36 participating bands from Germany, Denmark, the UK, the Netherlands, Portugal, Sweden, Switzerland and Hungary. Chelyabinsk jazzmen gave thirteen concerts on the most festival stages: street and club scenes, concert halls and at official receptions. All concerts in Dresden were held in full house. The German audience was cheering, shouting Bravo, danced, and invariably demanded to play an encore, «Zu gabe!»

In 2018 Uralskiy Dixieland performed at prestigious festivals: "Russian stars of world jazz" in Moscow, World Jazz Festival in Latvia, International jazz festival in Bansko, Bulgaria, Nišville International Jazz Festival in Serbia, Super Jazz Ashdod in Israel, etc.

The list of jazz artists that have co-performed with Uralskiy Dixieland is extensive. In Western Europe, the band played together with such legendary British singers as Nat Gonella and Beryl Bryden. In Russia, Uralskiy Dixieland gave several concerts together with American singer Denise Perrier, British singer John Downes, Spanish singer Big Mama Montse and others. The band expanded their creative horizons thanks to real-life contacts at various venues with such stars as Dizzy Gillespie, Art Farmer, Scott Hamilton, Chris Barber, Anatoly Kroll, Georgy Garanian, David Goloschekin, Igor Butman, Daniel Kramer, Alexander Oseychuk, Larisa Dolina, etc.

The experts often remark the authentic New Orleans style of Uralskiy Dixieland referring to their faithfulness to the traditions of this branch of early jazz. The musicians are real showmen – they are fond of signing, playing, and even marching.

In 2019, in honor of his 50th anniversary, band gave a big concert at the Chelyabinsk Philharmonic. Among the guests of the festive show were jazz musicians from Moscow, Saint Petersburg and Yekaterinburg: David Goloschekin, Maxim Piganov, Alexey Podymkin, Konstantin Gevondyan, Peter Vostokov, Lev Orlov, and the "Kickin' Jass Orchestra" ensemble.

During the quarantine due to pandemic of coronavirus the participants in Uralskiy Dixieland Valery Sundarev and Natalia Rikker conducted an online discussion of "What is jazz improvisation? Myths and truth". Director of the Jamey Aebersold Jazz Studies Program at the University of Louisville School of Music in Louisville, Kentucky, Professor Michael Tracy, Consul for culture of the US Consulate General in Yekaterinburg Matthew Thompson, jazz saxophonist and teacher Samir Kambarov became their interlocutors. With the help of the latest video conferencing system provided by the Ministry of information technology of the Chelyabinsk region, jazz musicians from Russia and the United States managed not only to meet and talk, but even to play music together! In the history of the Chelyabinsk jazz, an experiment with simultaneous playing online was conducted for the first time ever.

== Band members ==
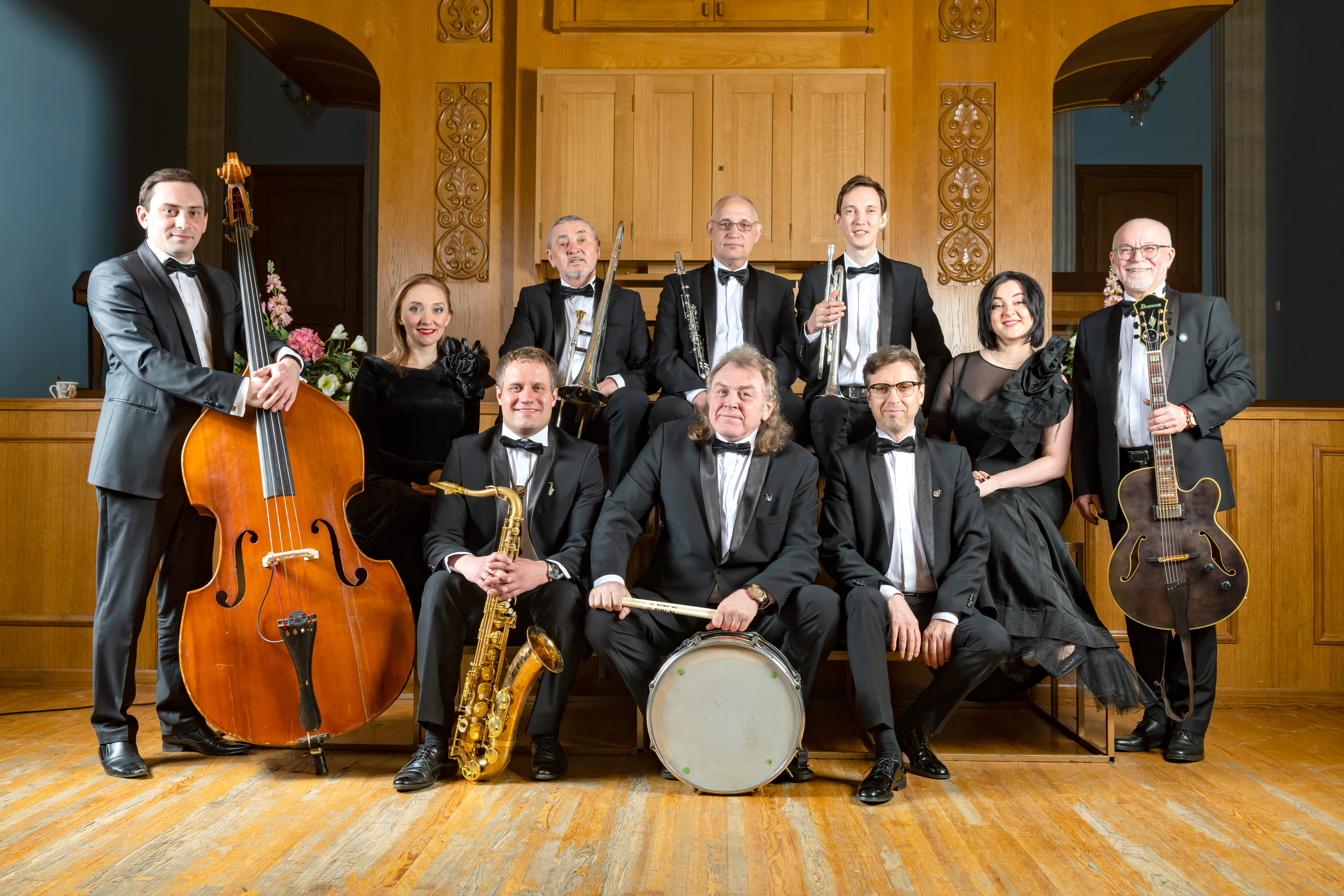
Uralskiy Dixieland jazz ensemble, Rodina Concert Hall, Chelyabinsk, Russia, 2019

- Valery Sundarev – bandleader, guitar, banjo, vocals
- Victor Rikker – drums, percussion
- Stanislav Bernshteyn – double bass, bass guitar
- Nail Zagidullin – trombone, vocals
- Dmitry Perminov – saxophone, clarinet
- Alxander Kolosov – saxophone, clarinet
- Ivan Pona – trumpet, flugelhorn
- Konstantin Scheglov – piano, accordion, pianica
- Maria Bolotina – vocals
- Natalia Rikker – director, compere

== Discography ==
- Internationales Dixieland Festival – Dresden 1985/86 (GDR, LP, 1986)
- Vernis domoy, Bill Bailey (Come Home Bill Bailey) (USSR, LP, 1987)
- With Jazz From Russia (Netherlands, CD, 1991)
- Russian Roulette (Netherlands, CD, 1993)
- Russia Meets America (Netherlands, CD, 1995)
- America Meets Russia (Netherlands, CD, 1995)
- Igor Bourco's Uralsky Jazzmen featuring Beryl Bryden & Nat Gonella. Oh Mo’nah! (Netherlands, CD, 1997)
- Veise Jazz’2003 (Russia, CD 1, 2)
- Internationales Dixieland Festival Dresden. The best sound of the festival 2017 (Germany, CD, 2017)
- Favorites (Russia, CD, 2018)
- From Moscow to Rio (Russia, 2LP, 2020)
- Uralskiy Dixieland feat. Oleg Akkuratov. Merry Christmas! Счастливого Рождества! (Russia, 2LP, 2021)
- From Duke To Beatles. Tribute To John Pizzarelli (Russia, 2LP, 2022)
- Leonid Ptashka & Igor Bourco's Uralskiy Dixieland (Russia, EP, 2022)
- Songs About the Motherland (Russia, EP, 2024).
