= A House Full of Love: Music from The Cosby Show =

A House Full of Love: Music from The Bill Cosby Show

Studio album by Grover Washington Jr.
- Released: 1986
- Recorded: September 1985
- Studio: Mayfair Studios, NY
- Genre: Jazz, funk
- Length: 37:53
- Label: Columbia FC 40270
- Producer: Grover Washington Jr., Stu Gardner

Grover Washington Jr. chronology
Inside Moves (1984)	A House Full of Love: Music from The Bill Cosby Show (1986)	Strawberry Moon (1987)

Professional ratings
Review scores
Source	Rating
Allmusic	3/5 stars

A House Full of Love: Music from The Bill Cosby Show is a studio album by American jazz saxophonist Grover Washington Jr. recorded together with an ensemble of various musicians. The album was released in 1986 through Columbia Records label. Most of the compositions in the record were written by Bill Cosby, Stu Gardner and Arthur Lisi.

== Reception ==
Ed Hogan of AllMusic wrote "This album was presented by longtime Bill Cosby collaborator, producer Stu Gardner and includes the theme song and background music from on his hugely successful 80s NBC-TV sitcom. Of note are Cosby's recitations on the steppers favorite, "Look at This," (the instrumental version was used in a dance scene between Cosby and co-star Phylicia Rashad) and the earnest "Love In Its Proper Place".

== Track listing ==
No.	Title	Writer(s)	Length
1.	"Resthatherian"	Bill Cosby, Stu Gardner	2:40
2.	"Camille"	Bill Cosby	4:58
3.	"Love in Its Proper Place" (feat.: Bill Cosby)	Bill Cosby, Stu Gardner	3:36
4.	"Poppin'"	Stu Gardner, Paul Griffin, Gary King, Jeff Mironov, Scott Schreer, Richard Tee, W. W. Watson	3:52
5.	"Kitchen Jazz"	Bill Cosby, Stu Gardner	3:12
6.	"Clair (Phylicia)"	Bill Cosby, Stu Gardner	4:00
7.	"The Huxtable Kids"	Bill Cosby, Stu Gardner	3:11
8.	"Outstretched Hands"	Stu Gardner	4:58
9.	"Look at This" (feat.: Bill Cosby)	Bill Cosby, Stu Gardner	3:13
10.	"A House Full of Love" (feat.: Lori Fulton)	Lori Fulton, Stu Gardner, Arthur Lisi	4:13
Total length:			37:53

== Personnel ==
- Grover Washington, Jr. – alto saxophone, tenor saxophone
- Michael Brecker – tenor saxophone
- Randy Brecker – trumpet
- Jon Faddis – trumpet, trumpet solo (5)
- Allen Reuben – trumpet
- Richard Tee – grand piano (1, 9), Fender Rhodes
- Paul Griffin – synthesizers (1, 2, 4–10), grand piano (4), orchestra contractor
- Stu Gardner – arrangements, grand piano (2, 8), Hammond B3 organ (3), backing vocals (3)
- Philip Woo – synthesizers (3)
- Jeff Mironov – guitars, guitar solo (2)
- Melvin "Wah Wah" Watson – guitars
- Sid McGinnis – slide guitar (3)
- Cameron Brown – double bass
- Gary King – electric bass
- Tom Barney – electric bass (3), acoustic bass (8)
- Marcus Miller – bass (10)
- Scott Schreer – drums, percussion
- Steve Gadd – additional drums (5)
- Gloria Agostini – harp (8)
- Arthur Lisi – arrangements, orchestrations
- Obie Hemsey – orchestra contractor
- Bill Cosby – lead vocals (3, 9)
- Patti Austin – backing vocals (3)
- Michael Bolton – backing vocals (3)
- Jocelyn Brown – backing vocals (3)
- Lori Fulton – backing vocals (3), lead vocals (10)
- Lani Groves – backing vocals (3)
- James Ingram – backing vocals (3)
- Ullanda McCullough – backing vocals (3)
- The Fabulous Waller Family – backing vocals (10)

== Production ==
- George Butler – executive producer
- Stu Gardner – producer
- Grover Washington, Jr. – producer, mixing
- Lenny Manchess – recording
- Ron Allaire – recording assistant
- Jack Kennedy – recording assistant
- Eddie Smith – recording assistant
- Brian Drago – mixing
- Vlado Meller – mastering
- Paul Silverthorn – production coordinator
- Garvin Eddy – production design
- Chuck Vinson – stage manager
- Keith Wingfield – creative concept
- Allen Weinberg – art direction, design
- Michele Ali – cover photo coordinator
- Gary Heery – cover photography

Studios

- Mixed at Broccoli Rabe Entertainment Complex (Fairfield, NJ).
- Mastered at CBS Studios (New York, NY).

== Charts ==
Chart (1986)	Peak position
US Billboard Pop Albums	125
