= Oleg Butman =

Russian jazz drummer

Oleg Butman (born 9 July 1966 in Leningrad ) is a Russian jazz drummer. The younger brother of Igor Butman, a well-known jazz saxophonist, he is best known for his performances with Eric Marienthal and more recently with the Oleg Butman Quartet. He released the album Passion in 2009, with Natalia Smirnova on piano, Wayne Escoffery and Mark Gross on saxophones and Essiet Essiet on bass.
