= It's True! It's True! =

Live album by Bill Cosby
- Released: 1969
- Recorded: Late 1968
- Venue: Harrah's (Lake Tahoe)
- Genre: Stand-up comedy
- Length: 33:49
- Label: Warner Bros.
- Producer: Jimmy Hilliard

Bill Cosby chronology
200 M.P.H. (1968)	It's True! It's True! (1969)	8:15 12:15 (1969)

It's True! It's True! is the eighth comedy album by Bill Cosby, released in 1969 by Warner Bros. Records. It was recorded live at Harrah's, Lake Tahoe, Nevada and was his last for Warner Bros. Due to a musician's strike, Cosby was allotted extra stage time at Harrah's, much of which was captured on this album. It features Cosby performing stand-up comedy on topics including women, helicopters, ants, burlesque, gambling, the toxic drug Spanish fly, and his travels to countries outside the United States.

The album reached No. 21 on the R&B Albums chart, and reached No. 37 on the Billboard 200 the same year. It received favorable reviews and garnered retrospective praise from AllMusic, The Colorado Springs Gazette, the Philadelphia Daily News and The Deseret News.

The album received renewed attention in 2014, after multiple women accused Cosby of sexual assault and rape, often facilitated by drugs. The Village Voice reported on the similarities between the female accusers' allegations and Cosby's "Spanish Fly" routine on the album, where he recounted his desire to slip the drug into women's drinks. Further comparisons were reported on by multiple publications, including CNN, The Boston Globe, the International Business Times, the Chicago Sun-Times, Philadelphia Daily News and The Washington Post.

== Production ==
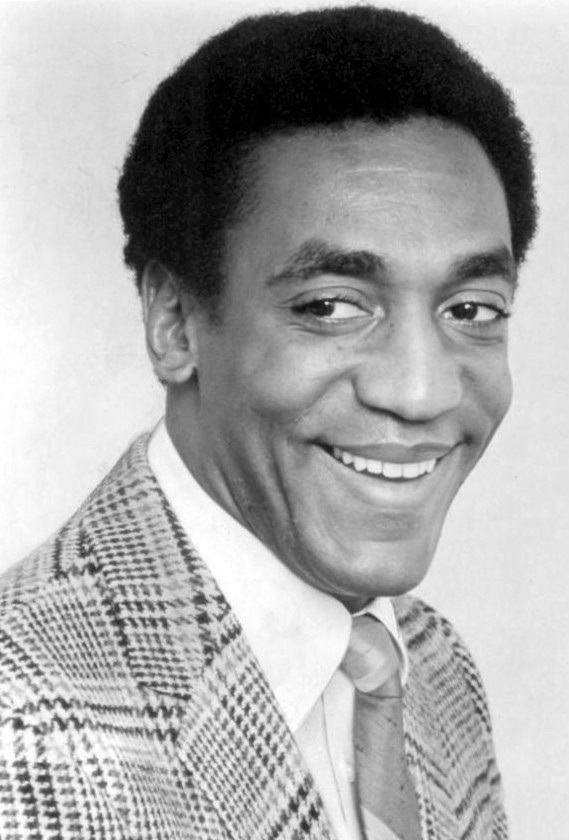
Bill Cosby in 1969, the same year the album was released.

=== Recording ===
It's True! It's True! was Cosby's last album for Warner Bros. Records for twenty years. His later albums, including the subsequent production 8:15 12:15, were released under Tetragrammaton Records, which was managed by Cosby and associates Bruce Post Campbell and Roy Silver under Cosby's parent company CSC Corps. It was recorded live at Harrah's, Lake Tahoe, Nevada. Due to a musician's strike, Cosby was allotted extra stage time at Harrah's, much of which was captured on this album.

Cosby wrote all the material for the album and was its sole performer. The mastering on the album was carried out with a process referred to as Haeco-CSG monaural processing, which was used for a few years during the transition from mono to stereo to create artificial stereo from mono recordings. According to AllMusic, this led to a decrease of lower frequencies and an audio image which was not well established.

=== Release ===
The recording was released in 1969 in live album format. It was subsequently released on compact disc in 2005 by Rhino Records, and again in 2008 by Rhino Flashback. A digital version was jointly released in 2013 by Rhino and Warner Bros.

== Reception ==
Professional ratings
Review scores
Source	Rating
AllMusic	3/5 stars

=== Commercial ===
It's True! It's True! reached No. 21 on the R&B Albums chart, and reached No. 37 on the Billboard 200 the same year.

=== Critical ===
AllMusic gave the album three stars out of a possible five. In a 1990 article reflecting on Cosby's career, The Colorado Springs Gazette placed the album among the artist's "Major Records".

Upon the album's 2005 release on compact disc, Philadelphia Daily News gave it a favorable review, inviting readers to "Return with us now to the glory days of Bill Cosby as a standup comedian". The newspaper called the album "still very funny". The same year The Deseret News called the album "very funny", and noted it recounted Cosby's days filming I Spy. The article called the re-release of Cosby's work a "cause for celebration".

== Retrospective controversy ==
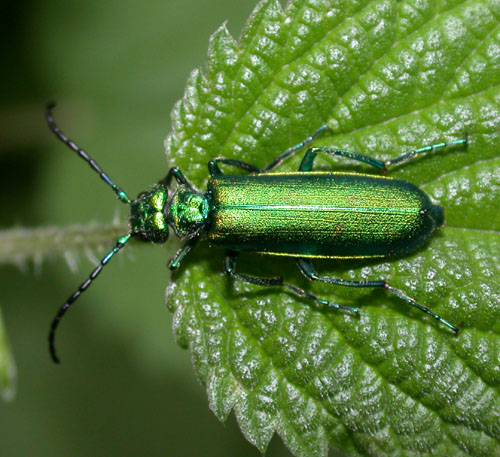
Cosby's routine from the album discussing attempts to obtain the drug derived from the Spanish fly and use it on women by placing it into their drinks has been heavily discussed in the media.

In a track on the album titled "Spanish Fly", Cosby discussed his desire to obtain the drug Spanish fly and use it on women by placing it into their drinks. (Note: The chemical is mistakenly believed to have aphrodisiac properties for females — in reality it does so for men, and its effects can lead to toxicity, poisoning, and death.) Cosby said he first learned about the substance at age 13.

"'You know anything about Spanish fly?' 'No, tell me about it.' 'Well there's this girl Crazy Mary, you put some in her drink man, she, 'Haaaaaaaaaaaaah'.' From then on, any time you see a girl. 'Wish I had some Spanish fly.' Go to a party, see five girls standing alone. 'Boy, if I had a whole jug of Spanish fly I'd light that corner up over there.' Haaa-ha-ha."

— Bill Cosby, "Spanish Fly", It's True! It's True! (1969)

Cosby further elaborated on his attempts to find Spanish fly in his book Childhood, published in 1991 by Putnam. In its review of the book, The Columbus Dispatch noted Cosby's story about Spanish fly "ventures a bit beyond" childhood. Dayton Daily News wrote that Spanish fly is described in Cosby's book as a type of "wonder drug". In a 1991 interview with Larry King, Cosby again joked about usage of the drug on women. In 1994, Greensboro News & Record reported that Cosby told a story about how, in his youth, he had tried to purchase Spanish fly from a member of the military, and how it had turned out to be cornstarch.

The 1969 story by Cosby recounting his quest to find Spanish fly received renewed attention in 2014, after multiple women came forward to publicly accuse him of past incidents of sexual assault and rape against them. According to accounts by the women, Cosby utilized drugs to subdue them prior to the asserted acts of violation by the comedian. The "Spanish Fly" track from the album was re-discovered and publicized in 2014 by The Village Voice. Ebony described the unearthing of the audio as "unfortunate timing", given the accusations by women that Cosby had drugged them prior to sexual assault. The Boston Globe wrote: "Cosby had an entire stand-up routine about drugging women's drinks with 'Spanish fly' back in 1969; that it got laughs then says a lot about how views can shift in 45 years." The comparison between the routine and women's subsequent accusations of drug-facilitated sexual assault received additional coverage from other publications, including the International Business Times, the Chicago Sun-Times, The Washington Post, Philadelphia Daily News, and CNN. With regards to the "Spanish Fly" piece, The Washington Post wrote, "in hindsight one of his riffs seems particularly insensitive."

== Track listing ==
All material written by Bill Cosby.

Side one

1. It's the Women's Fault – 5:25
2. Helicopters – 1:40
3. Ants Are Cool – 1:05
4. Burlesque Shows – 2:25
5. The American Gambler – 1:10
6. Shoelaces – 1:00
7. Spanish Fly – 2:55

Side two

1. Mr. Ike & The Neighborhood TV Set – 4:45
2. Foreign Countries – 14:00
- "It's the Women's Fault" begins with a re-telling of the routine "The Apple" from Cosby's previous album, To Russell, My Brother, Whom I Slept With (1968).

== Personnel ==
- Bill Cosby – performer

Technical

- Jimmy Hilliard – producer
- Lowell Frank – engineer
- Rudy Hill – editing
- Ed Thrasher – art direction, cover photography
- Dave Schultz – digital mastering

== See also ==
- Bill Cosby Is a Very Funny Fellow...Right! (Debut album by Cosby, also released by Warner Bros. Records)
