= At Last Bill Cosby Really Sings =

Studio album by Bill Cosby
- Released: 1974
- Recorded: 1974
- Genre: Comedy, soul
- Label: Partee

Bill Cosby chronology
Bill (1973)	At Last Bill Cosby Really Sings (1974)	Down Under (1975)

At Last Bill Cosby Really Sings is an album by Bill Cosby. It is his fifth music-based album and the only one released on the Stax Records-distributed Partee Records. It features appearances from former Stevie Wonder band members like future R&B star Ray Parker Jr. on guitar, and also features a second collaboration with his songwriting partner Stu Gardner, who plays organ on the album.

A truncated, instrumental version of "Kiss Me" would serve as the theme for The Cosby Show ten years later.

== Track listing ==
=== Side one ===
1. "Train to Memphis" (Stuart Gardner/Bill Cosby)
2. "Kiss Me" (Gardner/Cosby)
3. "No One Can Love the Way You Do" (Gardner/Cosby)
4. "Dedicated to Phyllis" (Cosby)

=== Side two ===
1. "It's Strange" (Gardner/Cosby)
2. "Put Love In Its Proper Place" (Gardner)
3. "Dance of the Frozen Lion" (Cosby/Gardner)
4. "Special Lady Sweetness" (Gardner)
5. "Take Your Time" (Gardner/Cosby)

== Personnel ==
- Bill Cosby – vocals, spoken word
- Stu Gardner – piano, organ
- Ray Parker Jr. – guitar
- Ollie E. Brown – drums
- Rudy Johnson – flute, saxophone
- Sylvester Rivers – piano
- Alexandra Richman – piano, synthesizer
- Michael Boddicker – synthesizer
- George Bohannon – trombone
