= Disco Bill =

Studio album by Bill Cosby
- Released: September 1977
- Recorded: 1977
- Genre: Comedy
- Label: Capitol/EMI Records
- Producer: Stu Gardner

Bill Cosby chronology
Bill Cosby Is Not Himself These Days (1976)	Disco Bill (1977)	My Father Confused Me... What Must I Do? What Must I Do? (1977)

Professional ratings
Review scores
Source	Rating
AllMusic	1.5/5 stars

Disco Bill (1977) is an album by Bill Cosby. It is his fifth, and last, musical comedy/parody album. As with Bill Cosby Is Not Himself These Days, Cosby stated he improvised much of the material on the album; as its name implies, the album spoofs the disco craze of the late 1970s.

== Track listing ==
1. A Simple Love Affair (Cosby, Gardner) – 4:38
2. What Ya Think 'Bout Lickin' My Chicken (Cosby, Gardner, Watson) – 4:04
3. Rudy (Cosby, Gardner) – 1:56
4. Boogie on Your Face (Cosby, Gardner) – 3:03
5. Happy Birthday Momma (Cosby, Gardner, Mays) – 4:01
6. That's How I Met Your Mother (Cosby, Gardner) – 3:19
7. 1, 2, 3 (Barry) – 4:10
8. Section #9 (Cosby, Gardner) – 3:12
9. A Nasty Birthday (Cosby) – 3:32
10. What's in a Slang (Cosby, Gardner) – 2:19
