= 8:15 12:15 =

1969 live comedy album by Bill Cosby

Live album by Bill Cosby
- Released: June 1969
- Recorded: January 12, 1969; Harrah's Lake Tahoe, Nevada
- Genre: Stand-up comedy
- Length: 71:20
- Label: Tetragrammaton

Bill Cosby chronology
It's True! It's True! (1969)	8:15 12:15 (1969)	The Best of Bill Cosby (1969)

Professional ratings
Review scores
Source	Rating
AllMusic	2/5 stars

8:15 12:15 is the ninth comedy album by Bill Cosby. It was his first double-disc album. It was also his first record not released strictly by Warner Bros. Records label but by Tetragrammaton Records (which was co-owned by Cosby at the time) instead.

== Background ==
This album was recorded live at Harrah's Lake Tahoe, Nevada. As implied by the title, the album is made of recordings from two shows. The 8:15 show was more family-oriented material and the 12:15 contained more adult humor. Unlike Cosby's Warner Bros. LPs, the album is not edited from various bits but instead purports to be complete recordings of the two shows.

Much of the material was previously recorded for Cosby's earlier albums; Some material performed at the first show is also performed at the second show. There are several instances of Cosby interacting with the audience, and at one point he introduces Carroll Shelby, creator of the custom-made Shelby Cobra from 200 M.P.H.

This album was recorded shortly before production began on The Bill Cosby Show, and on Side One Cosby talks briefly about the upcoming series.

There are two versions of the album, one containing a few lines near the end of the 12:15 disc pertaining to his wife's pregnancy and alludes to a failed diaphragm, referring to it as "the midnight tramboline (trampoline)". This last portion of the routine is edited out in some copies of the LP.

The shows on this album were recorded a few hours after Joe Namath's New York Jets' guaranteed win over the Baltimore Colts in Super Bowl III. On side one, Cosby asks how the football game was that day, and makes mention of "a lot of Baltimore people out there just eating".

== Track listing ==
=== 8:15 ===
Side one

1. "Opening" – 17:35

Side two

1. "Main Dinner Show" – 14:00

=== 12:15 ===
Side three

1. "Opening" – 19:30

Side four

1. "Main Second Show" – 20:15
