= Strawberry Moon (album) =

Studio album by Grover Washington Jr.
- Released: 1987
- Genre: Jazz fusion, Smooth jazz
- Length: 39:41
- Label: Columbia
- Producer: Grover Washington Jr.; Michael J. Powell; Marcus Miller

Grover Washington Jr. chronology
A House Full of Love (1986)	Strawberry Moon (1987)	Then and Now (1988)

Professional ratings
Review scores
Source	Rating
AllMusic	3/5 stars
The Penguin Guide to Jazz Recordings	2.5/4 stars
The Rolling Stone Jazz & Blues Album Guide	2/5 stars

Strawberry Moon is a jazz album by Grover Washington Jr. It was released in 1987 through Columbia Records, catalog 40510. The album was produced by Grover Washington Jr, except for two tracks. The first of these, "Summer Nights," was co- produced with Marcus Miller and was released as a single, reaching #35 in the Billboard R&B Charts. The second, "I Will Be Here for You," was co-produced by Washington and Michael J. Powell.

== Reception ==
A reviewer of Jet commented: "The smash album featuring the new hit single 'The Look of Love', with vocals of Jean Carne". Scott Yanow of AllMusic wrote that "Grover Washington, Jr.'s first album in three years (and debut for Columbia) did not yield any major hits but found him playing in prime form".

== Track listing ==
1. "Strawberry Moon" (Washington) – 4:26
2. "The Look of Love" (Burt Bacharach, Hal David) – 4:40
3. "Shivaree Ride" (Washington) – 4:45
4. "Caught a Touch of Your Love" (James Best, Craig Bickhardt, Jack Keller) – 5:11
5. "Maddie's Blues" (Alf Clausen) – 2:47
6. "I Will Be Here for You" (Steve George, John Lang, Richard Page) – 5:33
7. "Monte Carlo Nights" (Todd Cochran, Stix Hooper) – 5:53
8. "Keep in Touch" (Gary Taylor) – 4:27
9. "Summer Nights" (Marcus Miller) – 6:29

== Personnel ==
- Grover Washington Jr. – alto saxophone, soprano saxophone, tenor saxophone, Fender Rhodes, Fairlight CMI
- James K. Lloyd – grand piano, Fender Rhodes, Yamaha DX7, Fairlight CMI
- James Simmons – Fairlight CMI (5)
- Joey DeFrancesco – grand piano (8), Fender Rhodes (8)
- Marcus Miller – multi instruments (9)
- Richard Steacker – guitars (1–3, 5, 7, 8)
- B.B. King – guitar (4), lead vocals (4)
- Michael J. Powell – guitars (6)
- Gerald Veasley – 5-string bass (1, 3, 4, 6–8)
- Tyrone Brown – electric upright bass (2, 5)
- Darryl Washington – drums (1–8), timbales (9)
- Jim Salamone – LinnDrum (1, 3), percussion (1, 3)
- Ellen Cohen – bell tree (1), wind chimes (1)
- Leonard Gibbs – congas (1–8), percussion (2, 4–8)
- Jean Carne – lead vocals (2, 8)
- Spencer Harrison – lead vocals (7), backing vocals (7, 8)
- Liz Hogue – backing vocals (7, 8)

== Production ==
- George Butler – executive producer
- Grover Washington Jr. – producer, mixing
- Michael J. Powell – co-producer (6)
- Marcus Miller – co-producer (9), mixing (9)
- Peter Humphreys – engineer (1–8), mixing (1–8)
- Tim Kinsey – engineer (4)
- Eric Calvi – engineer (9)
- Michael O'Reilly – engineer (9)
- Randy Abrams – assistant engineer (1–8)
- Ronnie James – assistant engineer (1–8)
- Scott MacMinn – assistant engineer (1–8)
- Armand Pocoroba – assistant engineer (1–8)
- Dave Saia – assistant engineer (1–8)
- Adam Silverman – assistant engineer (1–8)
- Nelson Ayers – assistant engineer (9)
- Chaz Clifton – assistant engineer (9)
- Dan Grigsby – assistant engineer (9)
- Neil Nappe – assistant engineer (9)
- Jim Regan – assistant engineer (9)
- Nimitr Sarkananda – mastering
- Christopher Austopchuk – art direction, design
- Jennifer Baumann – photography

Studios

- Recorded at Sigma Sound Studios (Philadelphia, PA); Counterpoint Studios (New York, NY); House of Music (West Orange, NJ); Dallas Sound Lab (Irving, TX).
- Tracks 1–8 mixed at Sigma Sound Studios; Track 9 mixed at A & R Recording (New York, NY).
- Mastered at Masterwork Recording (Philadelphia, PA).

== Charts ==
Chart (1987)	Peak position
Australia (Kent Music Report)	100
