= Little Ole Man (Uptight, Everything's Alright) =

Single by Bill Cosby

from the album Silver Throat: Bill Cosby Sings
- B-side: "Don' Cha Know"
- Released: 1967
- Genre: R&B, comedy
- Length: 4:10
- Label: Warner Bros.
- Songwriters: Henry Cosby, Sylvia Moy, Stevie Wonder
- Producer: Fred Sledge Smith

Bill Cosby singles chronology
"Little Ole Man (Uptight, Everything's Alright)" (1967)	"Hooray for the Salvation Army Band" (1967)

"Little Ole Man (Uptight, Everything's Alright)" is a single by comedian Bill Cosby, released in 1967 from the entertainer's first musical comedy album, Silver Throat: Bill Cosby Sings. On the 1968 album 200 M.P.H., Cosby states that the song was dedicated to his grandfather.

== Background ==
A comedic parody which Cosby narrated about "a little ole man" whom he discovers three times, first getting hit by a train, later being run over by elephants, and lastly having no recollection of either incident. The musical instrumental, chorus, and accompanying background vocals were a direct lift of the Stevie Wonder 1965 song "Uptight (Everything's Alright)", which had been a recent hit, and the authorship of "Little Ole Man" is credited solely to the authors of "Uptight". "Uptight" co-author Henry Cosby has no relation to Bill Cosby.

== Chart history ==
The single became an unexpected hit for Cosby, reaching number four on the Billboard Hot 100.

Chart (1967)	Peak position
Canada RPM	2
U.S. Billboard Hot 100	4
U.S. Billboard Top Selling R&B Singles	18
