= Bill Cosby Presents Badfoot Brown & the Bunions Bradford Funeral Marching Band =

Studio album by Bill Cosby
- Released: 1972
- Recorded: 1972
- Genre: Jazz, jazz funk
- Label: Sussex
- Producer: Bill Cosby

Bill Cosby chronology
Bill Cosby Talks to Kids About Drugs (1971)	Bill Cosby Presents Badfoot Brown & the Bunions Bradford Funeral Marching Band (1972)	Inside the Mind of Bill Cosby (1972)

Bill Cosby Presents Badfoot Brown & the Bunions Bradford Funeral Marching Band (1972) is an album written and produced by Bill Cosby.

It is Cosby's fourth musical release, although he does not perform on the album, save for a vocal part on "Abuse". The music is in a jazz-funk style. Cosby released a similarly titled album in 1971, Badfoot Brown & the Bunions Bradford Funeral & Marching Band (note second "&") where he played Rhodes piano.

== Track listing ==
All tracks are written by Bill Cosby.

No.	Title	Length
1.	"Bunions"	7:29
2.	"The Blues"	14:09
3.	"I Love You Camille"	2:49
4.	"Abuse"	15:19
5.	"Mouth of the Fish"	3:40

Tracks 2 and 5 feature vocals by Stu Gardner.
