= For Adults Only =

Live album by Bill Cosby
- Released: November 1971
- Recorded: 1971; Las Vegas, Nevada
- Genre: Stand Up Comedy
- Label: MCA Records

Bill Cosby chronology
When I Was a Kid (1971)	For Adults Only (1971)	Badfoot Brown & the Bunions Bradford Funeral & Marching Band (1971)

Professional ratings
Review scores
Source	Rating
Allmusic	2.5/5 stars

For Adults Only (1971) is the thirteenth comedy album by Bill Cosby. It was recorded at the International Hotel which is now the Westgate Las Vegas Resort & Casino.

== Track listing ==
1. Las Vegas/Mirror Over My Bed – 3:01
2. Why Beat on Your Wife – 4:33
3. Bill Cosby Fights Back – 7:29
4. Be Good to Your Wives – 5:38
5. Masculinity at Its Finest – 9:28
6. The Cost of an Egg – 3:02
7. Bill's Two Daughters – 7:24
8. Wallie, Wallie – 3:45
- Later pressings split tracks one and two:
1. Las Vegas – 1:11
2. Mirror Over My Bed – 2:00

The cassette version splits the "Masculinity at Its Finest" routine into two parts at approximately the 1:30 mark, in order to achieve equal running times on both sides.
