= Silver Throat: Bill Cosby Sings =

Studio album by Bill Cosby
- Released: August 1967
- Recorded: 1967
- Genre: rhythm and blues
- Length: 30:31
- Label: Warner Bros.
- Producer: Fred Smith

Bill Cosby chronology
Revenge (1967)	Silver Throat: Bill Cosby Sings (1967)	Bill Cosby Sings Hooray for the Salvation Army Band! (1968)

Singles from Silver Throat: Bill Cosby Sings
- 1. "Little Ole Man (Uptight, Everything's Alright)" Released: August 1967

Professional ratings
Review scores
Source	Rating
Allmusic	2.5/5 stars

Silver Throat: Bill Cosby Sings (1967) is the sixth album by Bill Cosby.

== Background ==
This was Cosby's first album that was recorded in the studio, as well as his first album that showcased his singing, backed by the Watts 103rd Street Rhythm Band. Although marketed as a musical comedy album, it consisted mostly of straightforward rhythm and blues performances, including several Jimmy Reed songs, a cover version of Ray Charles' "I Got a Woman" with slightly comedic lyrics, "Mojo Workout", which was a sequel to the Muddy Waters classic "I Got My Mojo Workin'", and "Little Ole Man" which combined a comedic monologue with Stevie Wonder's "Uptight (Everything's Alright)". (Note that "Uptight" co-author Henry Cosby is no relation to Bill Cosby.) Also included is an original song credited to Bill Cosby, "Don'cha Know".

"Little Ole Man" became a major hit upon release as a single, reaching #4 on the U.S. Hot 100 chart.

The cover photo comes from an episode of the first season of I Spy, "The Conquest of Maude Murdock".

== Track listing ==
=== Side one ===
1. "Bright Lights, Big City" (Reed) – 2:41
2. "Big Boss Man" (Dixon, Smith) – 2:45
3. "Hush Hush" (Reed) – 1:54
4. "Baby, What You Want Me to Do" (Reed) – 2:43
5. "Tell Me You Love Me" (Reed, Smith) – 3:07
6. "Aw Shucks, Hush Your Mouth" (Reed) – 1:36

=== Side two ===
1. "Little Ole Man (Uptight, Everything's Alright)" (Henry Cosby, Sylvia Moy, Wonder) – 4:10
2. "Mojo Workout" (Bright) – 2:53
3. "I Got a Woman" (Charles) – 3:22
4. "Don'cha Know" (Bill Cosby) – 2:45
5. "Place in the Sun" (Miller, Wells) – 2:35
