= Bill Cosby Sings Hooray for the Salvation Army Band! =

Studio album by Bill Cosby
- Released: February 1968
- Recorded: Late 1967
- Genre: Rhythm and blues
- Length: 35:57
- Label: Warner Bros.
- Producer: Fred Smith

Bill Cosby chronology
Silver Throat: Bill Cosby Sings (1967)	Bill Cosby Sings Hooray for the Salvation Army Band! (1968)	To Russell, My Brother, Whom I Slept With (1968)

Professional ratings
Review scores
Source	Rating
Allmusic	3/5 stars

Bill Cosby Sings Hooray for the Salvation Army Band! (1968) is the seventh album by Bill Cosby. This was his second studio album to feature his singing, and features less serious renditions (often with satirical lyrics written or improvised by Cosby) of then-current rock and soul hits. As on his previous, debut music album Silver Throat, he is backed by the Watts 103rd Street Rhythm Band.

The title track is actually a parody set to the tune of Jimi Hendrix's "Purple Haze", although Hendrix is not credited, while "Funky North Philadelphia" is also a parody of the Dyke and the Blazers/Wilson Pickett song "Funky Broadway."

The cover photo is from the 16th espiode of the third season of I Spy, "Tag, You're It."

== Track listing ==
=== Side one ===
1. Sgt. Pepper's Lonely Hearts Club Band (Lennon–McCartney) – 2:20
2. Sunny (Bobby Hebb) – 3:26
3. Reach Out (I'll Be There) (Dozier, Holland) – 3:44
4. (I'm a) Road Runner (Dozier, Holland) – 3:33
5. (I Can't Get No) Satisfaction (Jagger/Richards) – 2:41
6. Get Out of My Life, Woman (A. Toussaint) – 2:50

=== Side two ===
1. Hooray for the Salvation Army Band (Cosby, Smith) – 3:06
2. Funky North Philadelphia (Jackie Lee) – 2:38
3. Hold On, I'm a Comin' (Hayes, Porter) – 2:36
4. Ursalena (Cosby, Smith) – 2:36
5. Time Brings About a Change (Carmichael, Cosby, Lee) – 3:12
6. Stop, Look & Listen (Lee, Telf) – 3:15
