= Bill (Bill Cosby album) =

Compilation album by Bill Cosby
- Released: 1973
- Recorded: 1969–1973
- Genre: Stand-up comedy
- Length: 75:39
- Label: MCA Records
- Producer: Gil Rodin

Bill Cosby chronology
Fat Albert (1973)	Bill (1973)	At Last Bill Cosby Really Sings (1974)

Professional ratings
Review scores
Source	Rating
Allmusic	4.5/5 stars

Bill (1973) is a compilation album of previously released material by Bill Cosby. All the routines are edited down compared to their original appearances on previous albums, some slightly, some considerably.

== Track listing ==
1. Handball At The "Y" – 3:38
2. "Froofie" The Dog – 4:15
3. Survival – 2:56
4. Fernet Branca – 7:55
5. Snakes and Alligators – 2:34
6. Track and Field/High Jump – 5:33
7. Ennis' Toilet – 1:31
8. My Brother, Russell – 3:04
9. Masculinity At Its Finest – 5:53
10. Wally, Wally – 3:39
11. My Dad's Car – 4:52
12. The Lower Track – 2:13
13. (In Las Vegas) Be Good To Your Wives – 4:03
14. (In Las Vegas) Bill Cosby Fights Back – 4:23
15. Buck Jones – 5:13
16. Bill Cosby's First Baby – 5:17
17. Basketball – 3:20
18. Fat Albert's Car – 5:19
