= Inside the Mind of Bill Cosby =

Live album by Bill Cosby
- Released: September 1972
- Recorded: 1972
- Genre: Stand-up comedy
- Label: MCA Records

Bill Cosby chronology
Bill Cosby Presents Badfoot Brown & the Bunions Bradford Funeral Marching Band (1972)	Inside the Mind of Bill Cosby (1972)	Fat Albert (1973)

Professional ratings
Review scores
Source	Rating
AllMusic	3/5 stars
Newsday	A−

Inside the Mind of Bill Cosby (1972) is the 14th album of stand-up comedy by Bill Cosby. Recorded at the Circle Star Theater, it is the fifteenth such album he released, but only the fourth on Uni Records (when that label folded, the album was distributed by its parent company, MCA). The album is available on compact disc, but to date the other Uni albums have not been so released.

Unlike many of his previous albums, on which his youth provided the source of his routines, Cosby's material here centers mostly on contemporary incidents with his family, notably the tracks "Bedroom Slippers" (involving back-yard play by his youngest daughter and their dogs) and "Froofie The Dog" (involving his oldest daughter wanting to watch the television while Bill himself is watching Gunsmoke). His youth is explored in the album's closing track, "Slow Class."

== Track listing ==
1. The Invention of Basketball – 4:22 - a satirical exploration of Dr. James Naismith
2. Survival – 3:15
3. Ennis' Toilet – 1:41
4. Bill's Marriage – 2:08
5. Bedroom Slippers – 6:48
6. Froofie the Dog – 5:28
7. The Lower Tract – 2:23
8. Sulphur Fumes – 0:56
9. Football – 2:30
10. Slow Class – 8:23 - mentions his Fat Albert character
