= Bill Cosby: Himself =

1983 film by Bill Cosby

- North American home release poster
- Directed by: Bill Cosby
- Written by: Bill Cosby
- Produced by: Bill Cosby; James B. Herring
- Starring: Bill Cosby
- Cinematography: Joseph M. Wilcots
- Edited by: Ken Johnson; Steve Livingston
- Music by: Bill Cosby; Stu Gardner
- Production companies: Jemmin, Inc.
- Distributed by: 20th Century-Fox
- Release date: May 20, 1983
- Running time: 105 minutes
- Country: United States
- Language: English

Bill Cosby: Himself is a 1983 comedy film featuring American stand-up comedian Bill Cosby. Filmed before a live audience at Hamilton Place in Hamilton, Ontario in 1981, Cosby gives the audience his views ranging from marriage to parenthood. The film also showcases Cosby's conversational style of stand-up comedy. For most of the performance, Cosby is seated center-stage, only getting up to emphasize a joke.

Many of the comedic routines presented in the film were precursors to Cosby's most popular sitcom, The Cosby Show. An album of the same name was also released on Motown Records. The film was well regarded by comedians and critics, with some calling it "the greatest stand up concert movie ever."

== Themes ==
Nearly all of Cosby's routine concerns the trials and tribulations of parenting, frequently illustrated with anecdotes involving his own family. Occasionally, he compares these with stories from his childhood. Other themes include grandparents, going to the dentist (in which monologue he uses his "Mushmouth" speech pattern to imitate a dental patient anesthetized by Novocaine), and people who drink too much or take drugs.

== Production ==
Written, directed, and produced by Cosby, Himself is a live comedy performance film. It was made from the highlights of four shows at Hamilton Place Performing Arts Center, Ontario in May 1981.

== Reception ==
On Rotten Tomatoes the show has an approval rating of 83% based on reviews from 6 critics.

Vincent Canby of The New York Times called it a "low-keyed and occasionally funny ramble through the star's life". Canby was critical of "a certain on-screen monotony" but puts it down to it being a recorded rather than a real live performance and "the interference of cinema technology."

In his book Guide for the Film Fanatic (1986), Danny Peary gave Bill Cosby: Himself a negative review, writing,

No doubt Cosby hoped to obtain the wild success Richard Pryor had with his concert films. But this picture...is painfully unfunny. Whether talking about drunks, dentists, or his family, he’s about as dull as one of those guys on cable who give advice on real estate and how to use tax loopholes. The material is remarkably impersonal and conventional and doesn’t compare to bits on his old comedy albums; and at no time does he display the mischievous boyishness that makes his television character so likable. The comedian gets cooking only when he talks about his parents, now (when they’re angelic grandparents) and years ago (when they were strict to their small children). But this routine is too brief and comes at the very end of the picture.

Bill Cassel of All Music Guide reviewed the album recording of the show and argued that with the audio-only version, "his total mastery of his art comes into sharper focus.” Cassel wrote that it was "a professional comedian at the top of his game, toying with structure, timing, and tone, holding his audience with absolute confidence." Cassel did note that "times have changed" and also that with hindsight the tragic death of Cosby's son Ennis changes the tone of some moments.

In 2004 critic David Nusair gave it 2 out of 4. He said it was "overlong" and he found many of the anecdotes were not interesting. Nusair found Cosby's physical comedy to be an unnecessary distraction, from his excellent storytelling. He concludes that the show "would probably be best enjoyed by those who are already fans of Cosby's unique style of comedy, as the movie isn't always accessible to newcomers."

Rob Gonsalves of eFilmCritic.com reviewed the show in 2015 and gave it 3 out of 5, but was critical of Cosby for his judgmental style. "Too much of the film is Cosby passing judgment, as if comedy weren't good enough anymore; he also has to tell us a thing or two." He notes that by that point Cosby's reputation had been irrevocably damaged but "Face it, he was always a dick." Josiah Hesse of Vulture.com reviewed the film in 2015 with the intention of trying to appreciate the work on its own terms, but despite calling it "one of the greatest specials of all time" and "the nucleus of modern standup" found it impossible to separate the work from the man and appreciate it objectively.

== Awards ==
Rolling Stone listed it at #7 in its list of the 25 Best Stand-Up Specials.

== Home media ==
The film also saw success on home video, and by 1989 had already sold 350,000 units and was the number #1 best seller according to trade journal Home Video Publisher. It was priced at $19.99 compared to $30–40 price range of video cassettes in the years before when home video releases for comedy were less common. It was released on DVD in 2004. Despite the film's impact and popularity it is not available to view on any of the major streaming services.
