= Live: Madison Square Garden Center =

Live album by Bill Cosby
- Released: August 1970
- Recorded: February 7, 1970; Madison Square Garden; New York City
- Genre: Stand-up comedy
- Label: Uni/MCA Records

Bill Cosby chronology
| More of the Best of Bill Cosby (1970) | Live: Madison Square Garden Center (1970) | When I Was a Kid (1971) |

Professional ratings
Review scores
| Source | Rating |
|---|---|
| Allmusic | 3/5 stars |

Live: Madison Square Garden Center (1970) is the 11th comedy album by Bill Cosby.

The entire album was ad-libbed on stage at the Felt Forum at Madison Square Garden. The album features highlights from two shows of February 7, 1970, which Cosby performed in a cast on his right foot due to a recent injury to his ankle. The shows also featured musical performances from Carmen McRae and Lionel Hampton, whose set featured Cosby coming out to play "The Saints" on vibraphone.

== Track listing ==
1. Bill's Marriage – 3:40
2. Bill's First Baby – 8:30
3. Bill Takes His Daughters to the Zoo – 2:50
4. Ennis and His Two Sisters – 5:45
5. The Story of the Chicken – 2:55
6. Animal Stories – 7:00
7. Handball at the "Y" – 4:00
8. Bill Visits Ray Charles – 5:00
