= Sports (Bill Cosby album) =

Live album by Bill Cosby
- Released: October 1969
- Recorded: 1969
- Genre: Stand-up comedy
- Length: 41:38
- Label: Uni/MCA Records; UNI-73066

Bill Cosby chronology
The Best of Bill Cosby (1969)	Sports (1969)	More of the Best of Bill Cosby (1970)

Sports is the 10th comedy album by Bill Cosby. It was released in October 1969 and was his first on the Uni Records label, which would eventually become MCA Records. It won the Grammy Award for Best Comedy Album at the 1970 Grammy Awards. It was recorded live at Whisky a Go Go.

== Track listing ==
1. Football - 7:01
2. Bill Cosby Goes to a Football Game - 6:24
3. Baseball - 4:57
4. Track and Field: High Jump - 10:52
5. Track and Field: Mile Relay - 8:32
6. Basketball - 3:37
