= Bill Cosby Talks to Kids About Drugs =

Studio album by Bill Cosby The Cosby Kids
- Released: November 10, 1971
- Recorded: 1971
- Genre: Children
- Length: 32:33
- Label: Uni/MCA Records

Bill Cosby The Cosby Kids chronology
Badfoot Brown & the Bunions Bradford Funeral & Marching Band (1971)	Bill Cosby Talks to Kids About Drugs (1971)	Bill Cosby Presents Badfoot Brown & the Bunions Bradford Funeral Marching Band (1972)

Bill Cosby Talks to Kids About Drugs (1971) is an album by Bill Cosby. Unlike most of his recordings, this is not a full-fledged comedy album, but rather a record intended for children to school them on the dangers of drugs through songs and dialogue. It won the Grammy Award in 1972 for Best Recording for Children.

== Track listing ==
1. Introduction - Downers And Uppers
2. Questions and Answers
3. Dope Pusher
4. Bill Talks About Hard Drugs
5. I Found a Way Out
6. Order In The Classroom
7. People Make Mistakes
8. I Know I Can Handle It
9. Bill Talks About Pushers
10. Captain Junkie
11. Bill and the Kids Sing / Closing
