= Himself (Bill Cosby album) =

Soundtrack album by Bill Cosby
- Released: December 1982
- Recorded: 1982 at Hamilton Place Theatre, Hamilton, Ontario
- Genre: Comedy
- Label: Motown
- Producer: Steve Barri

Bill Cosby chronology
Bill's Best Friend (1978)	Himself (1982)	Those of You with or Without Children, You'll Understand (1986)

Himself is the 18th comedy album by Bill Cosby. it contains highlights from the stand-up comedy film of the same name. This is his only album released on Motown Records.

Professional ratings
Review scores
Source	Rating
Allmusic	link

== Reception ==
Bill Cassel of All Music Guide argued that the audio only version removed all distractions brought "his total mastery of his art [...] into sharper focus" and that it was "a professional comedian at the top of his game, toying with structure, timing, and tone, holding his audience with absolute confidence." Cassel did note that "times have changed" and also that with hindsight the tragic death of Cosby's son Ennis changes the tone of some moments.

== Track listing ==
1. "The Dentist" - 5:59
2. "Natural Childbirth" - 8:16
3. "Brain Damage" - 4:20
4. "Kill the Boy" - 4:07
5. "Chocolate Cake for Breakfast" - 7:44
6. "Same Thing Happens Every Night" - 7:56
7. "The Grandparents" - 7:06

== Awards ==
The album was nominated for a Grammy in the category Best Comedy album.
