= Those of You with or Without Children, You'll Understand =

Those of You With or Without Children, You'll Understand

Live album by Bill Cosby
- Released: June 1986
- Recorded: 1986
- Genre: Comedy
- Length: 49:08
- Label: Geffen/Warner Bros. Records; GHS 24104
- Producer: Camille Olivia Cosby

Bill Cosby chronology
Himself (1983)	Those of You With or Without Children, You'll Understand (1986)	Cosby and the Kids/Cosby Classics (1986)

Those of You with or Without Children, You'll Understand is the 19th comedy album by Bill Cosby. It was his first of two for Geffen Records and the first album to be produced by his wife Camille. The album was recorded at The Syria Mosque, Pittsburgh, PA, and The Riverfront Coliseum, Cincinnati, OH. It won the Grammy Award for Best Comedy Album at the 29th Annual Grammy Awards in 1987.

== Track listing ==
Side 1

1. Genesis - 18:02
2. The Great Quote - 4:10

Side 2

1. Window of Life - 26:56
