= Badfoot Brown & the Bunions Bradford Funeral & Marching Band =

Studio album by Bill Cosby
- Released: August 1971
- Recorded: 1971
- Genre: Jazz, jazz funk
- Length: 35:45

Bill Cosby chronology
For Adults Only (1971)	Badfoot Brown & the Bunions Bradford Funeral & Marching Band (1971)	Bill Cosby Talks to Kids About Drugs (1971)

Badfoot Brown & the Bunions Bradford Funeral & Marching Band (1971) is an album by Bill Cosby. It is an instrumental jazz-funk album in which Cosby plays Rhodes piano. It is his third musical album release. The first track is a tribute to Martin Luther King Jr. It was issued on compact disc in 2008 by Dusty Groove.

Another jazz-funk album, titled Bill Cosby Presents Badfoot Brown & the Bunions Bradford Funeral Marching Band (no "&" between Funeral and Marching), was released the following year. Cosby did not perform on that album, but he wrote the music and produced it.

== Reception ==
A contemporary review in the jazz publication DownBeat awarded the album one-and-a-half stars and began with the words "Aw, no, Cos. What'd you wanna do this for?".

Professional ratings
Review scores
Source	Rating
DownBeat	1.5/5 stars

== Track listing ==
All tracks are written by Bill Cosby.

No.	Title	Length
1.	"Martin's Funeral"	15:30
2.	"Hybish Shybish"	20:15
