= Wonderfulness =

Live album by Bill Cosby
- Released: May 1966
- Recorded: 1965; Harrah's; Lake Tahoe, Nevada
- Genre: Stand-up comedy
- Length: 47:11
- Label: Warner Bros.
- Producer: Ron Silver

Bill Cosby chronology
Why Is There Air? (1965)	Wonderfulness (1966)	Revenge (1967)

Professional ratings
Review scores
Source	Rating
AllMusic	4.5/5 stars

Wonderfulness (1966) is the fourth album of stand-up comedy performances by Bill Cosby. The title comes from a catchphrase used in Cosby's television series, I Spy.

This was the first of several Cosby albums to be recorded live at Harrah's, Lake Tahoe, Nevada, by Warner Bros. Records. Seven of the eight tracks are drawn from Cosby's childhood experiences; the last one, "Niagara Falls", deals with a visit to that landmark by television producer Sheldon Leonard, who hired Cosby to star in I Spy.

The version of "Shop" from this album differs from the track of the same title on Cosby's previous album, Why Is There Air?. Wonderfulness won the 1967 Grammy Award for Best Comedy Album.

== Track listing ==
=== Side one ===
1. Tonsils – 15:19
2. The Playground – 3:21
3. Lumps – 1:39
4. Go Carts – 5:40

=== Side two ===
1. Chicken Heart – 12:28
2. Shop – 2:33
3. Special Class – 1:34
4. Niagara Falls – 4:52
