= Fat Albert (album) =

Live album by Bill Cosby
- Released: June 1973
- Recorded: 1972; Harrah's; Reno, Nevada
- Genre: Stand-up comedy
- Length: 35:26
- Label: MCA Records

Bill Cosby chronology
Inside the Mind of Bill Cosby (1972)	Fat Albert (1973)	Bill (1973)

Fat Albert (1973) is the 15th comedy album by Bill Cosby. It was recorded at Harrah's Hotel in Reno, Nevada.

After six years of recalling memories of his childhood friend "Fat Albert" Robertson in his stand-up routines, this would be the final album in which Fat Albert is mentioned.

Two tracks on the album were previously released (and edited differently) on When I Was a Kid: "Fat Albert Got a Hernia" (as "My Hernia") and "My Brother, Russell."

Unlike some of his other albums, the album had more kid-friendly humor on it.

== Track listing ==
All tracks by Bill Cosby

1. "Fat Albert's Car" – 8:15
2. "Fat Albert Plays Dead" – 2:07
3. "Fat Albert Got A Hernia" – 3:54
4. "My Wife and Kids" – 4:11
5. "My Dad's Car" – 5:50
6. "My Brother, Russell" – 2:30
7. "Fernet Branca" – 9:37

== Personnel ==
- Bill Cosby – vocals
- Lowell Frank – producer, engineer
- Mark Omann – mastering

== Reception ==
- Allmusic link
