= When I Was a Kid =

Live album by Bill Cosby
- Released: February 1971
- Genre: Stand-up comedy
- Label: MCA Records

Bill Cosby chronology
Live: Madison Square Garden Center (1970)	When I Was a Kid (1971)	For Adults Only (1971)

Professional ratings
Review scores
Source	Rating
Allmusic	3/5 stars

When I Was a Kid (1971) is the 12th comedy album by Bill Cosby, recorded at the Westbury Music Fair (later renamed Theatre at Westbury). The cover is an early appearance of Fat Albert and the Cosby Kids.

== Track listing ==
1. My Hernia – 6:22
2. Buck Jones – 6:18
3. Snakes and Alligators – 2:38
4. My Boy Scout Troupe – 2:13
5. My Brother, Russell – 3:31
6. My Father – 3:21
7. Dogs – 3:35
8. Frogs – 2:50
