= Revenge (Bill Cosby album) =

1967 live comedy album by Bill Cosby

Live album by Bill Cosby
- Released: April 1967
- Recorded: 1967; Harrah's; Lake Tahoe, Nevada
- Genre: Stand-up comedy
- Length: 41:56
- Label: Warner Bros.

Bill Cosby chronology
Wonderfulness (1966)	Revenge (1967)	Silver Throat: Bill Cosby Sings (1967)

Professional ratings
Review scores
Source	Rating
Allmusic	4/5 stars

Revenge (1967) is the fifth album by comedian Bill Cosby. It was recorded live at Harrah's, Lake Tahoe, Nevada by Warner Bros. Records. It won the 1968 Grammy Award for Best Comedy Album. It also hit #1 on the Billboard R&B chart and #2 on the magazine's Pop album chart.

== Background ==
Like earlier albums such as I Started Out as a Child and Wonderfulness, this album features several anecdotes based on Cosby's childhood memories. It also serves to introduce Fat Albert, one of his most enduring characters.

The track "Buck Buck" contains Cosby's first recorded mention of Fat Albert, his Philadelphia childhood friend who would later become the basis for the hit cartoon series Fat Albert and the Cosby Kids; Albert's signature cry "Hey! Hey! Hey!", a trademark of the later TV series, is also heard for the first time. Old Weird Harold, another of Cosby's friends/characters, figures prominently in the "9th Street Bridge" routine.

== Track listing ==
=== Side one ===
1. Revenge – 6:00
2. Two Daughters – 5:10
3. Two Brothers – 2:54
4. The Tank – 1:36
5. Smoking – 2:56
6. Wives – 2:37

=== Side two ===
1. Cool Covers – 4:22
2. 9th St. Bridge – 5:09
3. Buck, Buck – 9:13
4. Planes – 2:03

== See also ==
- Buck buck
- List of number-one R&B albums of 1967 (U.S.)
