= 200 M.P.H. =

Live album by Bill Cosby
- Released: October 1968
- Venue: Harrah's; Lake Tahoe, Nevada
- Genre: Stand-up comedy
- Length: 36:15
- Label: Warner Bros.

Bill Cosby chronology
| To Russell, My Brother, Whom I Slept With (1968) | 200 M.P.H. (1968) | It's True! It's True! (1969) |

Professional ratings
Review scores
| Source | Rating |
|---|---|
| Allmusic | 3/5 stars |

200 M.P.H. (1968) is the seventh stand-up comedy album by Bill Cosby, and his ninth album overall. It was recorded live at Harrah's, Lake Tahoe, Nevada, and released by Warner Bros. Records.

== Background ==
In 1967, Bill Cosby bought a Shelby Cobra Super Snake CSX 3303 from his friend, company founder Carroll Shelby. The car was a 1965 Cobra Competition roadster, retained by Shelby American as a PR car and then modified with the addition of two superchargers and a Ford C-6 automatic gearbox. Only two such cars were built; one was retained by Shelby and the other was sold to Cosby. Side two of this album (side one on the cassette release) is a single routine that focuses on Cosby's love of sports cars and his brief ownership of the Super Snake. The title, "200 M.P.H.", refers to Shelby's boast about the car's top speed; however, Cosby became so unnerved during a test drive that he returned it immediately afterward. Shelby American sold the car to S and C Motors in San Francisco, who in turn sold it to a customer named Tony Maxey. Maxey destroyed the CSX 3303 by driving over a cliff and into the Pacific Ocean; he died from his injuries a few days later. Brian Angliss purchased the vehicle and subsequently restored it. He plans to auction the car off.

In a late-night talk show appearance, Cosby briefly re-told this story and said that he had heard that Jimmy Webb (of "MacArthur Park" fame) eventually ended up with his Cobra.

While the majority of Cosby's Warner Bros. standup albums were regularly re-released on LP, and eventually issued on CD in April 1998, 200 M.P.H. was not reissued on vinyl (although it was available on cassette in the '80s). It did not see a CD release until 2005, mainly because of controversy over the main sketch's punchline: Afraid that the car was so powerful and hard to control that it would be lethal to the driver, Cosby decided to return it, saying, "Take the keys and this car, it's all paid for, and you give it to George Wallace." Wallace was a well-known pro-segregationist, and was campaigning for the presidency of the United States at the time this album was recorded.

== Track listing ==
=== Side one ===
| No. | Title | Length |
|---|---|---|
| 1. | "Mothers and Fathers" | 4:20 |
| 2. | "The Wife" | 1:48 |
| 3. | "The Grandfather" | 4:08 |
| 4. | "Dogs and Cats" | 3:01 |

=== Side two ===
| No. | Title | Length |
|---|---|---|
| 1. | "200 M.P.H." | 22:58 |
