= Why Is There Air? =

Live album by Bill Cosby
- Released: August 1965
- Recorded: 1965; Flamingo Hotel; Las Vegas, Nevada
- Genre: Stand-up comedy
- Length: 39:53
- Label: Warner Bros.
- Producer: Allan Sherman, Roy Silver

Bill Cosby chronology
I Started Out as a Child (1964)	Why Is There Air? (1965)	Wonderfulness (1966)

Professional ratings
Review scores
Source	Rating
AllMusic	4/5 stars

Why Is There Air? (1965) is Bill Cosby's third album. It was recorded at the Flamingo Hotel in Las Vegas, Nevada. It won the 1966 Grammy Award for Best Comedy Album.

The final track, "Hofstra", is an expanded re-telling of the "TV Football" routine from Cosby's second album, I Started Out as a Child. "I played for Temple University, and it's the truth," he says at the start of the routine. "Don't keep asking me, 'Did you really play?' Yes, I really played. At one time I had a beautiful body."

== Track listing ==
=== Side one ===
1. Kindergarten – 8:15
2. Personal Hygiene – 1:04
3. Shop – 3:10
4. Baby – 3:49
5. Driving in San Francisco – 3:45

=== Side two ===
1. $75 Car – 7:40
2. The Toothache – 4:10
3. Hofstra – 8:00

== Legacy ==
Jerry Seinfeld has cited this album as a major influence, stating that it "drove [him] crazy" and inspired his career as a comedian.
