= Bill Cosby Is a Very Funny Fellow...Right! =

Bill Cosby is a Very Funny Fellow...Right!

Live album by Bill Cosby
- Released: November 1963
- Recorded: The Bitter End, New York City
- Genre: Stand-up comedy
- Length: 30:12
- Label: Warner Bros.
- Producer: Allan Sherman, Roy Silver

Bill Cosby chronology
Bill Cosby is a Very Funny Fellow...Right! (1963)	I Started Out as a Child (1964)

Bill Cosby is a Very Funny Fellow...Right! is the debut album release by Bill Cosby. It was recorded live at the nightclub The Bitter End in New York City's Greenwich Village during early 1963. The album includes three sketches about Noah.

Sean Carruthers of AllMusic rated the album four-and-a-half stars out of five, saying that "Those who only know Bill Cosby as an '80s television star and product pitchman don't know how truly funny and edgy he used to be when he first started out."

Vinyl copies of the album had all the words of the title on the front cover in magenta. The compact disc changed the color to black. Additionally, the compact disc removed the words "Produced by Allan Sherman" which appeared underneath the title on the front cover of the vinyl album cover.

Professional ratings
Review scores
Source	Rating
AllMusic	4.5/5 stars

== Track listing ==
All content written by Bill Cosby.

=== Side one ===
1. A Nut in Every Car - 3:15
2. Toss of the Coin - 2:11
3. Little Tiny Hairs - 1:46
4. Noah: Right! - 3:35
5. Noah: and the Neighbor - 1:16
6. Noah: Me and You, Lord - 3:02

=== Side two ===
1. Superman - 1:04
2. Hoof and Mouth - 1:46
3. Greasy Kid Stuff - 3:07
4. The Difference Between Men and Women - 2:14
5. Pep Talk - 1:46
6. Karate - 5:11
