= To Russell, My Brother, Whom I Slept With =

1968 live comedy album by Bill Cosby

Live album by Bill Cosby
- Released: March 1968
- Recorded: January 27, 1968; Cleveland, Ohio
- Genre: Stand-up comedy
- Length: 41:09
- Label: Warner Bros.

Bill Cosby chronology
Bill Cosby Sings Hooray for the Salvation Army Band! (1968)	To Russell, My Brother, Whom I Slept With (1968)	200 M.P.H. (1968)

Professional ratings
Review scores
Source	Rating
AllMusic	4/5 stars

To Russell, My Brother, Whom I Slept With is the sixth comedy album by Bill Cosby and his eighth album overall. It was recorded in 1968 in the Cleveland Public Auditorium, and it was released later that year on a 12″ vinyl record.

== Background ==
The day of the recording, Cleveland experienced a severe ice storm which tied up traffic. Cosby delayed the opening of the act for an hour to give people time to arrive and find their way to their seats. Near the end of that hour, after a period of approximately 10 minutes with no new arrivals, a woman entered and made her way to a seat very near the front row. When she had seated herself, Cosby cupped his hands around the microphone and announced in a deep, stentorian voice, "You're late!" The entire audience erupted in laughter and the show then began.

This was Cosby's first album recorded in a large venue rather than an intimate nightclub.

As in many of his other albums and stand-up work, Cosby delves in great detail into his childhood. Side One covers topics such as the first sin ("The Apple") and Cosby's two daughters ("The Losers"). Side Two is one long story, recounting childhood antics in the bed that he and his brother shared when they were supposed to be asleep, which were also recounted more than 20 years later in the first chapter of his book Childhood.

It was number 1 on Spin magazine's list of the 40 Greatest Comedy Albums of All Time, calling it "stand-up comedy's masterpiece".

Writer/director Kevin Smith said on the An Evening with Kevin Smith 2: Evening Harder DVD that this was one of his favorite comedy albums.

== Track listing ==
=== Side one ===
1. Baseball – 2:36
2. Conflict – 1:18
3. The Losers – 8:50
4. The Apple – 1:42

=== Side two ===
1. To Russell, My Brother, Whom I Slept With – 26:43
