= I Started Out as a Child =

Live album by Bill Cosby

Live album by Bill Cosby
- Released: November 1964
- Venue: Mister Kelly's, Chicago
- Genre: Stand-up comedy
- Length: 30:42
- Label: Warner Bros.

Bill Cosby chronology
Bill Cosby Is a Very Funny Fellow...Right! (1963)	I Started Out as a Child (1964)	Why Is There Air? (1965)

I Started Out as a Child is Bill Cosby's second album, released in 1964. It is the first Cosby album that features his childhood memories in his comic routines, but many of the tracks are still observational humor.

The title of the album is the first words spoken by Cosby at the beginning of Side 1, as indicated in the liner notes on the back cover.

Recorded live at Mister Kelly's in Chicago, Illinois, the album won the Grammy Award in 1965 for Best Comedy Album. It was added to the National Recording Registry in 2009.

Professional ratings
Review scores
Source	Rating
AllMusic	link

== Track listing ==
=== Side one ===
1. Sneakers – 1:56
2. Street Football – 1:22
3. The Water Bottle – 0:51
4. Christmas Time – 1:44
5. The Giant – 2:29
6. Oops! – 0:58
7. The Lone Ranger – 3:07
8. Ralph Jameson – 1:53

=== Side two ===
1. Medic – 3:45
2. My Pet Rhinoceros – 0:46
3. Half Man – 0:47
4. Rigor Mortis – 2:47
5. The Neanderthal Man – 3:16
6. T.V. Football – 1:13
7. Seattle – 3:48
