= Stu Gardner =

American musician and composer

- Occupations: Musician, composer, producer
- Label: Spindizzy Records
- Website: stugardner.com (defunct)

Stuart Gardner is an American musician and composer. He is known for his collaborations with Bill Cosby, and for co-writing "Kiss Me", the theme song of Cosby's sitcom The Cosby Show. He produced the album A House Full of Love: Music from The Cosby Show, and was the musical director of Cos, The Cosby Show and its spin-off, A Different World.

== Career ==
Stu Gardner appeared in the 1967 film Point Blank as the singer in the nightclub scene, singing, "Mighty Good Times", which was written by him, and appears on the film's soundtrack album.

In 1971, Stu had a record album out, Big Mouth which was produced by David Briggs. Among the musicians playing on the album were Kent Sprague and Gary Stovall. It was released on Spindizzy Records Z 31024 in 1971. All of the songs were composed by Stu Gardner except for "Wake Up Little Girl" which was composed by Sprague. Gardner's composition "Where the Master Lives" was released on a single.

== Personal life ==
As of 2012, Gardner lives in Richmond, Virginia, with his wife Gloria.
