= Types of rape =

Various types of this form of sexual assault

Rape can be categorized in different ways: for example, by reference to the situation in which it occurs, by the identity or characteristics of the victim, and by the identity or characteristics of the perpetrator. These categories are referred to as types of rape. The types described below are not mutually exclusive: a given rape can fit into multiple categories, by for example being both a prison rape and a gang rape, or both a custodial rape and the rape of a child.

== Date rape ==
The term "date rape" is used to refer to several types of rape, broadly acquaintance rape, which is a non-domestic rape committed by someone who knows the victim, and drug facilitated sexual assault (DFSA), where the rapist intentionally drugs the victim with a date rape drug so that they are incapacitated. Acquaintance rape constitutes the vast majority of reported rapes, and DFSA is frequent. A commonly overlapping category is incapacitated rape, where the victim is incapacitated and unable to give consent – this is often the result of intoxication, but can also simply be because the victim is asleep or has a medical condition. DFSA is when the rapist intentionally incapacitates the victim via drugs, while acquaintance rape can occur when the victim is not incapacitated.

Acquaintance rape can occur between two people who know one another usually in social situations, between people who are dating as a couple and have had consensual sex in the past, between two people who are starting to date, between people who are just friends, and between acquaintances. They include rapes of co-workers, schoolmates, family, friends, teachers and other acquaintances, providing they are dating; it is sometimes referred to as "hidden rape" and has been identified as a growing problem in western society. A college survey conducted by the United States' National Victim Center reported that one in four college women have been raped or experienced attempted rape. This report indicates that young women are at considerable risk of becoming a victim of date rape while in college. In addition, there have been reported incidents of colleges questioning accounts of alleged victims, further complicating documentation and policing of student assaults, despite such preventive legislation as the Clery Act.

== Gang rape ==
Gang rape occurs when a group of people participate in the rape of a single victim. Rape involving two or more violators (usually at least three) is widely reported to occur in many parts of the world. Systematic information on the extent of the problem, however, is scant.

One study showed that offenders and victims in gang rape incidents were younger with a higher possibility of being unemployed. Gang rapes involved more alcohol and other drug use, night attacks and severe sexual assault outcomes and less victim resistance and fewer weapons than individual rapes. Another study found that group sexual assaults were more violent and had greater resistance from the victim than individual sexual assaults and that victims of group sexual assaults were more likely to seek crisis and police services, contemplate suicide, and seek therapy than those involved in individual assaults. The two groups were about the same in the amount of drinking and other drug use during the assault.

== Marital rape ==
Spousal rape also known as marital rape, wife rape, husband rape, partner rape or intimate partner sexual assault (IPSA), is rape between a married or de facto couple without one spouse's consent. Spousal rape is considered a form of domestic violence and sexual abuse. Research reveals that there are no significant difference in post-psychiatric disorders (depression, obsessive-compulsive disorder, social phobia, and sexual dysfunction) when comparing victims of marital/partner, date, and stranger rape. A following study comparing marital and stranger rape victims also discovered that both types of victims experienced related types and levels of post-trauma distress.

Historically, research has shown that often women do not believe that non-consensual sexual acts within a marriage constitutes as rape. From 1994 to 2010, in the United States, there was an overall decline of intimate partner violence of 63% in female victims and a decline of 64% in male victims.

== Child rape ==
Rape of a child is a form of child sexual abuse. When committed by another child (usually older or stronger) or adolescent, it is called child-on-child sexual abuse. When committed by a parent or other close relatives such as grandparents, aunts and uncles, it is also incest and can result in serious and long-term psychological trauma. When a child is raped by an adult who is not a family member but is a caregiver or in a position of authority over the child, such as school teachers, religious authorities, sports trainers (coaches) or therapists, to name a few, on whom the child is dependent, the effects can be similar to incestual rape.

== Shamanic rape ==
Shamanic rape occurs anytime an individual acting as a shaman, whether providing shamanic medicines or not, sexually penetrates a person whom they are serving. In cases where the shaman has provided shamanic medicine, it is also an instance of drug facilitated rape. Because shamans often act to provide a kind of therapy, this is also often a kind of therapy rape.

== Statutory rape ==
National and regional governments, citing an interest in protecting "young people" (variously defined but sometimes synonymous with minors) from sexual exploitation, treat any sexual contact with such a person as an offense (not always categorized as "rape"), even if he or she agrees to or initiates the sexual activity.

The offense is often based on the fact that people under a certain age do not have the capacity to give consent. The age at which individuals are considered competent to give consent, called the age of consent, varies in different countries and regions; in the US, the age ranges from 16 to 18, and in other countries, it could be as low as 12. Sexual activity that violates age-of-consent law, but is neither violent nor physically coerced, is sometimes described as "statutory rape", a legally-recognized category in the United States. Most states, however, allow persons younger than the age of consent to engage in sexual activity if the age difference between the partners is small; these are called close-in-age exemptions or a Romeo and Juliet exemption and even in countries where there is no official legal exemption, prosecutions are infrequent.

== Prison rape ==
Rates of prison rape have been reported as affecting between 3% and 12% of prison inmates in the US. Although prison rapes are more commonly same-sex crimes (since prisons are usually separated by sex), the attacker usually does not identify as homosexual. This phenomenon is much less common elsewhere in the western world. This is partly because of the differences in the structure of the prison system in the US as compared to the prison systems in Canada, Australia and Europe.

Statistically, there is a higher prevalence of mentally-ill individuals who are in prisons, instead of psychiatric facilities. These individuals are part of a high-risk group for sexual assault, as according to the NPREC, 12-13% of rape instances involves an individual who is mentally ill; 8 times more than the non-mentally ill prison population rape instances.

The attacker is most commonly another inmate.

== Serial rape ==
Serial rape is rape committed by a person over a relatively long period of time and committed on a number of victims. Most times this type of rapist is unknown to the victim and follows a specific and predictable pattern of targeting and assaulting victims.

A nationwide sample of serial rape cases that were reported to the FBI (Federal Bureau of Investigation) were analyzed and it was found that serial rapists showed a "high degree of criminal sophistication" and used less force against the victim. The more criminally sophisticated the rapist was, the more sexual acts were performed. A perpetrator that has criminal sophistication means that the perpetrator is more likely to remove any evidence that might assist enforcement in their investigation. For example, fingerprints, semen, and weapons.

== Payback rape ==
"Payback rape", also called "punishment rape" or "revenge rape", is a form of rape specific to certain cultures, particularly the Pacific Islands. It consists of the rape of a female, usually by a group of several males, as revenge for acts committed by members of her family, such as her father or brothers. The rape is meant to humiliate and bring shame upon the father or brothers, as punishment for their prior behavior towards the perpetrators. Payback rape is sometimes connected to tribal fighting.

== War rape ==
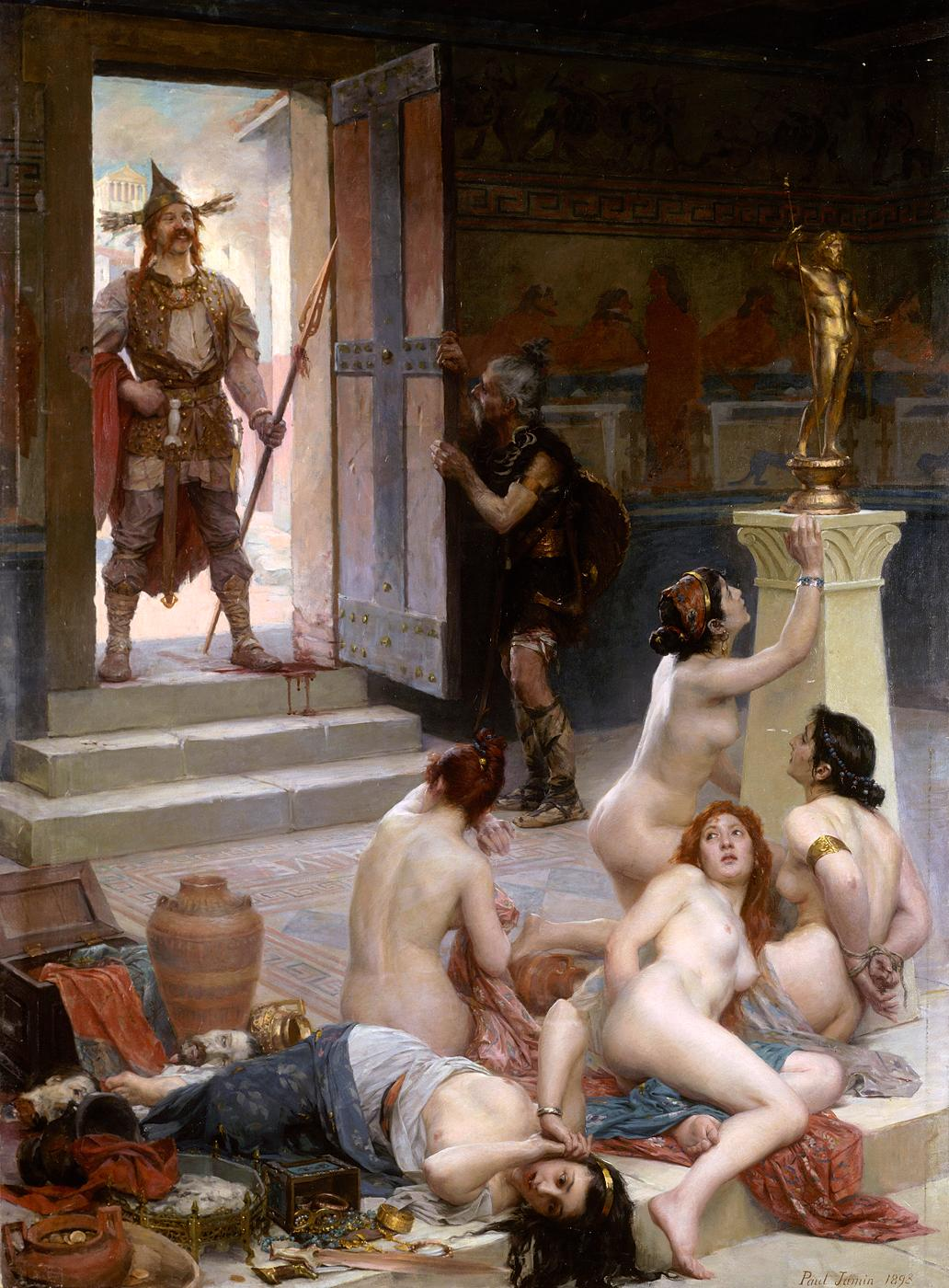
Brennus and His Share of the Spoils, by Paul Jamin, 1893

War rapes are rapes committed by soldiers, other combatants or civilians during armed conflict or war, or during military occupation. It also covers the situation where girls and women are forced into prostitution or sexual slavery by an occupying power.

During war, rape is often used as a means of psychological warfare in order to humiliate the enemy and undermine their morale. Rapes in war are often systematic and thorough, and military leaders may actually encourage their soldiers to rape civilians. Likewise, systematic rapes are often employed as a form of ethnic cleansing.

War rape has been considered a war crime only since 1949. Article 27 of the Fourth Geneva Convention explicitly prohibits wartime rape and enforced prostitution. These prohibitions were reinforced by the 1977 Additional Protocols to the 1949 Geneva Conventions. Therefore, during the post-war Nuremberg Trials and Tokyo Trials, mass war rape was not prosecuted as a war crime.

In 1998, the International Criminal Tribunal for Rwanda established by the United Nations made landmark decisions that rape is a crime of genocide under international law. In one judgement, Navanethem Pillay said: "From time immemorial, rape has been regarded as spoils of war. Now it will be considered a war crime. We want to send out a strong message that rape is no longer a trophy of war."

The word rape only began to be used to refer to sexual assault in the early 15th century, and its dominant usage remained to refer to abduction and robbery without any connotation of sexual assault until the modern period. Many classical references to rape during war do not refer explicitly to instances of sexual assault, but rather to the practice of abducting the women or property of the enemy during warfare.

== Rape by deception ==
Rape by deception involves the perpetrator gaining the victim's agreement through fraud. In one case, a man pretended to be an official for a government who had power to cause negative impacts on a woman to pressure her into sexual activities. The courts held that he had falsely represented himself and thus used deception against the woman.

== Corrective rape ==
Corrective rape is targeted rape against non-heterosexuals as a "punishment for violating gender roles". It is a form of hate crime against LGBT individuals, mainly lesbians, in which the rapist justifies the act as an acceptable response to the victim's perceived sexual or gender orientation and a form of punishment for being gay. Often, the stated argument of the corrective rapist is that the rape will turn the person straight, "correcting" their sex or gender, i.e. make them conform to the perpetrator's societal norms. The term was first coined in South Africa after well-known cases of corrective rape, such as that of sports star Eudy Simelane, became public.

== Custodial rape ==
Custodial rape is rape perpetrated by a person employed by the state in a supervisory or custodial position, such as a police officer, public servant or jail or hospital employee. It includes the rape of children in institutional care such as orphanages.

Custodial rape has been reported in India, Jamaica, Pakistan, Bangladesh, Malaysia, Sri Lanka, Iran, Cambodia, Nigeria, Kenya, Zambia and the United States.

In India custodial rape has been a major focus of women's rights organizations, and has been an official category of rape defined under law since 1983. Indian law says this type of rape takes advantage of the rapist's position of authority and is therefore subject to extra penalty.

The term custodial rape is sometimes used broadly to include rape by anyone in a position of authority such as an employer, money-lender, contractor or landlord, but under Indian law it refers only to government employees. Victims of custodial rape are frequently minorities, people who are poor, or low-status for example because of their caste. Researchers say custodial rape is part of a broader pattern of custodial abuse, which can also include torture and murder.

== Perpetrator types ==
Nicholas Groth has described three types of rape, based on the goal of the rapist. This includes the anger rapist, power rapist and sadistic rapist. According to Howard Barbaree, a psychologist at Queen's University in Kingston, Ontario, most rapes are impulsive and opportunistic, and committed by people who may commit other impulsive acts, including impulsive crimes. These rapists tend to show no anger except in response to their victim's resistance, and use little unnecessary force.

== Drug-facilitated sexual assault ==
Drug-facilitated sexual assault is a sexual assault (rape or otherwise) carried out on a person after the person has become intoxicated due to being under the influence of any mind-altering substances, such as having consumed alcohol or been intentionally administered another date rape drug. This is already mentioned in a 1938 film Pygmalion. In the 21st century saw many legal systems recognize rape of unconscious or incapacitated as illegal. A notable case was the Pelicot rape case, later leading to a CNN investigation exposing a global online communities, where participants shared information and advice on how perform such acts and even sharing footage of such acts.

== Further classification ==
As mentioned above, when differing acts of rape are defined and typified, whether by popular convention, research of the subject, or otherwise, the results are often neither exclusive nor exhaustive in scope. Some instances may fit two or more definitions, while others may remain as yet undefined. One example of this are the following sub-classifications created by American researcher Patricia Rozee:

- exchange rape - rape occurring as the result of bargaining
- punitive rape - rape used to punish or discipline
- theft rape - rape that happens when a person is abducted, in most cases to be used as a slave or a prostitute
- ceremonial rape - rape involving defloration rituals
- status rape - rape resulting from differences in hierarchy or social class

Where they are not already typed above, many of these otherwise distinct forms could equally apply to other classifications (e.g. prison rape that is also punitive rape, war rape that is also theft rape, etc.)

== See also ==
- Types of rapists
- Causes of sexual violence
- Rape by gender
- Rape statistics
- Gray rape
- Rape by proxy
