= Coco (website) =

Chat website

- Website type: Online chat
- Available in: French
- Dissolved: 25 June 2024
- Creator: Isaac Steidl
- Commercial: Yes
- Launched: 2003
- Current status: Closed

Coco, also variously referred to as Coco Chat or Cocoland (previously accessible under the name coco.fr, then coco.gg) is a French-language online chat website without registration and free to access (freemium), created by Isaac Steidl, and known for being regularly associated with criminal cases. It was closed in June 2024. A new version emerged in April 2026.

== Usage ==
The website was named after its logo, a stylized coconut. It was facilitated by the advent of Web 2.0. Previously, group discussions (known as rooms) were only possible via Internet Relay Chat, which was challenging for the general public.

Like many online chat platforms, the site facilitated connections between its users around public or private chat rooms and allowed everyone to exchange private messages. It was often likened to a dating site.

Because it permitted its users to remain anonymous, the site was particularly popular with gay people.

== History ==
Since launch in 2003 by French-born Isaac Steidl, the site appears to have belonged to several companies based in France or Hong Kong, apparently all owned by Steidl. Until 2022, the site was hosted in France and was reached by a French domain name at the address coco.fr. Some time after the arrest of Dominique Pelicot in the Mazan rapes case (late 2020), Coco moved its domain registration from France to Guernsey, adopting a .gg domain name which it can be seen was first registered on 31 December 2020.

In 2023, while still using the Guernsey domain name, the site was being operated by Bulgarian company Vinci SA and was recording 500,000 visits per month. Steidl himself settled in Eastern Europe and became an Italian citizen, renouncing his French nationality.

On June 25, 2024, the Paris Public Prosecutor's Office announced closure of the site and the judicial seizure of its servers. At the time of the closure France Info reported that it was hosted in Belgium and the closure had been facilitated through Eurojust multijurisdictional cooperation. Other sources stated at the time that site had been hosted in Germany.

Subsequent to the closure several apparent successor or clone sites have been seen, such as coco-chat.fr (defunct) and blairoudeurs.fr, but it is not clear what connection, if any, they may have had to coco-chat.

In January 2025, Steidl was taken into custody by French law enforcement. He was charged with aggravated procuring, aggravated money laundering and criminal conspiracy, as well as complicity in drug trafficking, child pornography and corruption of minors. Several bank accounts connected to the website were frozen in Hungary, Germany, Lithuania and the Netherlands, and 5 million euros were confiscated.

In April 2026, the website was relaunched under the name Cocoland. French authorities opened an investigation later that month. Steidl's attorney said his client had no connection to this new version.

== Controversies and cases ==
Easily accessible, simple to use, and without content moderation, coco.fr (and later coco.gg) was frequently associated with pedocriminal cases, homophobic incidents, or those related to drug trafficking. Its lack of moderation and a message history that did not exceed a few hours made it a "hunting ground for predators" according to the organization 'Agir contre la prostitution des enfants'. In October 2023, the organization SOS Homophobie called on French public authorities to shut down the site. According to French prosecutors, Coco has been cited since its creation in more than 23,000 reports of criminal activity and more than 480 victims have been involved in judicial proceedings involving the site.

In France, several violent homophobic attacks or those linked to drug trafficking have been connected to the use of coco.gg to identify and trap victims, notably in Dijon, Mâcon, Grande-Synthe, Marseille, and in March 2024, in Solliès-Pont.

Between January 2021 and May 2024, nearly 23,000 judicial procedures were opened in connection with this platform. Interior Minister Gérald Darmanin announced on 6 May 2024 he had referred the matter to the Public Prosecutor of the Republic. The site was shut down in June 2024.

=== Homophobic murder of Michel Sollossi ===
In 2018, Michel Sollossi was stabbed to death by Mohamed E., a man he had met on coco.fr, whom he had invited to his home. Although premeditation was not considered in the sentencing of the perpetrator, the homophobic nature of the attack was deemed an aggravating circumstance by the court.

=== Mazan rapes ===
In the Mazan rapes case, spanning from 2011 to 2020, 50 men were convicted of raping or sexually assaulting the same woman, Gisèle Pelicot, who was being sedated by her husband, Dominique Pelicot. Most of the abuses occurred at the Pelicots' home in Mazan, southern France. Pelicot used Coco to contact men whom he would invite to rape his wife. The 51st defendant was found guilty of sedating and raping not Pelicot's wife but his own, with Pelicot participating to the abuses. Pelicot had contacted him on Coco and instructed him on how to proceed.

=== Richard Dewitte Case ===
In September 2023, Richard Dewitte, singer of the 1970s French band Il était une fois, was sentenced to 3 years in prison for corruption of a minor under 15 years old. He was found guilty of making sexual propositions to a 13-year-old girl via the coco.fr site.
