= Types of rapists =

Types of rape perpetrator

There have been many theories set forth by researchers regarding the various types of rapists.

== Barbaree typology ==
According to Howard Barbaree, a psychologist at Queen's University in Kingston, Ontario, most rapes are impulsive and opportunistic, and committed by people who may commit other impulsive acts, including impulsive crimes. These rapists tend to show no anger except in response to their victim's resistance, and use little unnecessary force.

The so-called "power rapist" is preoccupied with a fixed sexual fantasy that they try to act out in the rape, such as a fantasy in which they force a victim to have sex, and they then fall in love with them. These are the least aggressive of rapists, and are the most likely to flee if the victim puts up a strong resistance.

"Vindictive rapists" commit physically harmful assaults with the intent to degrade and humiliate the victim.

"Anger rapists" are motivated by anger at the world at large; these are likely to inflict the most physical damage on their victims. These rapists tend to have a long history of violent crime of all sorts.

Some are sexual sadists who enjoy the victim's pain and fear.

== Groth typology ==
Nicholas Groth has described three types of rape based on the goal of the rapist.

=== Power rapist ===
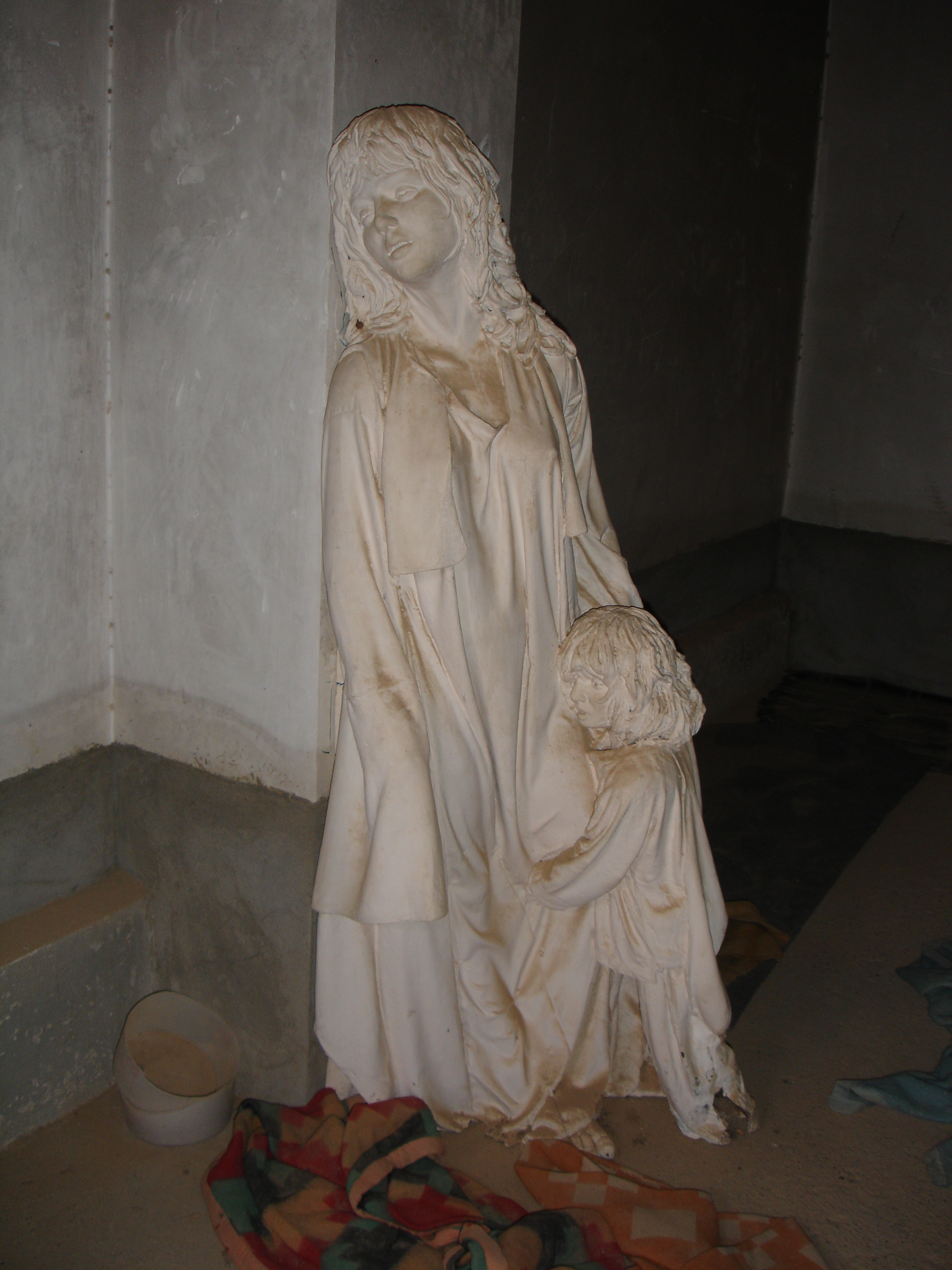
Amna Sur Museum in Sulaymaniyah. A replica of a Kurdish girl in prison. The girl was imprisoned at a young age. She was repeatedly beaten and raped by the guards in the prison.

For these rapists, rape becomes a way to compensate for their underlying feelings of inadequacy and feeds their issues of mastery, control, strength, authority and capability. The intent of the power rapist is to assert their competency. The power rapist relies upon verbal threats, intimidation with a weapon, and uses only the amount of force necessary to subdue the victim.

The power rapist tends to have fantasies about rape and sexual conquests. They may believe that even though the victim initially resists them, that once they overpower their victim, the victim will eventually enjoy the rape. The rapist needs to believe that the victim enjoyed what was done to them, and they may even ask the victim to meet them for a date later.

Because this is only a fantasy, the rapist does not feel reassured for long by either their own performance or the victim's response. The rapist feels gratified by the sexual pleasure and power and will usually act again. It becomes addictive. As a narcissist feeds on compliments, the power rapist feeds on power and domination of the victim.

Hence, their offenses may become repetitive and compulsive. They may commit a series of rapes over a short period of time. This is the most common type of serial rapist of strangers in the United States.

=== Anger rapist ===
The aim of this rapist is to humiliate, debase, and hurt their victim; they express their contempt for their victim through physical violence and profane language. For these rapists, sex is a weapon to defile and degrade the victim, rape constitutes the ultimate expression of their anger. This rapist considers rape the ultimate offense they can commit against the victim.

Anger rape is characterized by physical brutality, much more physical force is used during the assault than would be necessary if the intent were simply to overpower the victim and achieve penetration. This type of offender attacks their victim by grabbing, striking and knocking the victim to the ground, beating them, tearing their clothes, and raping them.

The experience for the offender is one that is of conscious anger and rage.

=== Sadistic rapist ===
For these rapists, there is a sexual association with various concepts. Sexual excitement is associated with the causing of suffering upon their victim. The offender finds the intentional maltreatment of their victim intensely gratifying and takes pleasure in the victim's torment, anguish, distress, helplessness, and suffering; the offender finds the victim's struggling an erotic experience.

Sadistic rape usually involves extensive, prolonged torture and restraint. Sometimes, it can take on ritualistic or other bizarre qualities. The rapist may use some type of instrument or a foreign object to penetrate their victim. Sexual areas of the victim's body become a specific focus of injury or abuse.

The sadistic rapist's assaults are calculated. They will often wear a disguise or will blindfold their victims. Prostitutes or other individuals whom they perceive to be "promiscuous" are often the sadistic rapist's targets. The victims of a sadistic rapist may not survive the attack. For some offenders, the ultimate satisfaction is gained from murdering the victim.

== Sexual gratification rapist ==
The motivation of the sexual gratification rapist is to obtain sex, according to Shannon M. Barton-Bellessa. Such an offender may otherwise be lonely and may have difficulty obtaining an outlet for their sexual desires in other ways due to being unsuccessful at courtship.

== Shamanic rapist ==
Shamanic rapists prey on participants of psychedelic rituals. Victims are typically unable to consent due to being under the influence of psychedelic substances or an unbalanced power dynamic.

Shamanic rapists purportedly believe that by raping somebody that they are serving, they are in service of that person's healing and growth. Shamans typically seem to believe that these interactions are consensual.

While shamanic rapists often live in denial that they have raped, they often acknowledge that if other people conducted themselves similarly, it would constitute rape.
