= Pelicot rape case =

21st-century sex crime in France

- Pelicot rape case (France)
- Date: July 2011 – October 2020
- Location: Mazan, France; Villiers-sur-Marne, France; Saint-Rémy-lès-Chevreuse, France; Île de Ré, France; Drôme, France (location of the rapes of Mrs Maréchal)
- Also known as: Mazan rape case
- Type: Rape
- Injuries: Gisèle Pelicot; Mrs Maréchal
- Convicted: Dominique Pelicot; Jean-Pierre Maréchal; 49 others
- Charges: Aggravated rape; Sexual assault
- Trial: Avignon, France

Over a period of nine years, from July 2011 to October 2020, Dominique Pelicot (French: [dɔminik peliko]), a man from Mazan in south-eastern France, repeatedly drugged and raped his wife, Gisèle Pelicot, (Note: For consistency, and to differentiate, this article refers to Gisèle Pelicot and her ex-husband Dominique Pelicot by their given names.) and invited male strangers through the internet to rape her while she was unconscious. Gisèle, who was unaware of the abuse perpetrated against her, was raped at least 92 times by 72 different men while her husband filmed and photographed the assaults. The crimes were discovered in September 2020 after Dominique was arrested for taking upskirt photographs of women in a supermarket; the ensuing police investigation uncovered hundreds of images on his computer equipment of men raping his wife.

The trial of Dominique and 50 other men accused of rape, attempted rape or sexual assault began in Avignon on 2 September 2024, and concluded on 16 December, with verdicts delivered on 19 December. All were convicted, with Dominique receiving the maximum 20-year prison term. Dominique was also found guilty of taking indecent images of his daughter and two daughters-in-law, and the rape of the wife of co-defendant Jean-Pierre Maréchal, who was charged with drugging and raping his own wife, and not Gisèle.

Gisèle's decision to waive her right to anonymity and insistence on a public trial attracted worldwide media attention and admiration. The trial drew attention to drug-facilitated sexual assault and issues around consent.

== Background ==
Gisèle and Dominique Pelicot were both born in 1952. Gisèle Pelicot, née Guillou, was born in Villingen in what was then West Germany, where her father served in the French Army. She moved to France at the age of five. Although she lost her mother at the age of nine, she later described her childhood as happy and stable. Dominique Pelicot was born in Quincy-sous-Sénart in the Paris region and spent part of his youth in Luçay-le-Mâle, central France, where his parents worked as janitors in a rehabilitation centre.

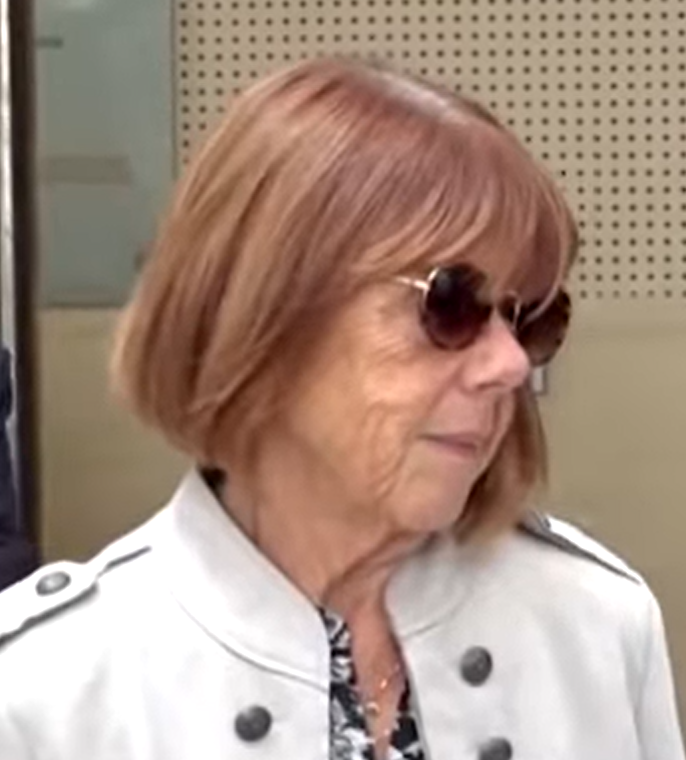
Gisèle Pelicot during her rapists' 2024 trial

Whereas Gisèle came from a relatively privileged background and felt loved by her family, Dominique had a troubled, working-class upbringing. According to Dominique, his father was brutal and abusive to his mother and raped his adopted sister. He also said that he was molested by a male nurse at the age of nine and that, as a teenager, he was forced to witness a gang rape. Dominique later blamed his "perversion" on those childhood traumas, which he said his marriage had helped him overcome for several decades. After two years of secondary education, Dominique had to stop going to school to start an apprenticeship as an electrician; he started working at age 13, and had to give 80% of his wages to his father. During judicial proceedings, it was speculated that Dominique suffered from an inferiority complex compared to his wife's background, which may have contributed to his behavior.

Gisèle and Dominique met in 1971, when they were both 18 years old, and married in April 1973. Gisèle was employed in administration at Électricité de France, while Dominique worked as an electrician and estate agent and later founded several small businesses that were unsuccessful. The couple lived in the Paris region and had three children.

Their marriage experienced a crisis in the mid-1980s when Gisèle had a three-year affair with a colleague. In 1986, when the Pelicots' youngest son was born, Dominique doubted whether he was the child's biological father. The Pelicots separated the following year, selling the home they owned jointly, though they later reconciled and resumed their life together. Dominique also had several affairs. In the early 1990s the couple separated again when Dominique left Gisèle for another woman; the Pelicots reconciled once more after a few months. In 2001, due to Dominique's business failures, the Pelicots divorced to protect their assets from his creditors while continuing to live together; they remarried in 2007 under a more beneficial regime.

In 2013, the Pelicots retired to Mazan, in the Vaucluse department of south-eastern France. Gisèle joined a local choir, while Dominique pursued cycling, home maintenance and other leisure activities. They were regularly visited by their children and grandchildren and spent time with friends in the area. Before the crimes were uncovered, Gisèle was unaware that Dominique had been fined for upskirting women near Paris in 2010; he was fined €100 for that offense. At the time, police found that Dominique's DNA matched a sample in the National Automated Genetic Fingerprint File, which connected him to an unsolved 1999 rape case. The judiciary was notified but due to organizational problems the information was not processed, allowing Dominique to avoid arrest.

As he approached retirement, Dominique spent much of his free time looking for pornography on the Internet. He attributed this to sexual frustration in his marriage because his wife refused to engage in certain practices and was not interested in swinging. Around 2010 or 2011, an online acquaintance sent Dominique photos of his own wife whom he had sedated, and instructed him on how he could do the same to his own partner. After hesitating for a short while, Dominique decided to follow suit.

== Patterns of abuse ==
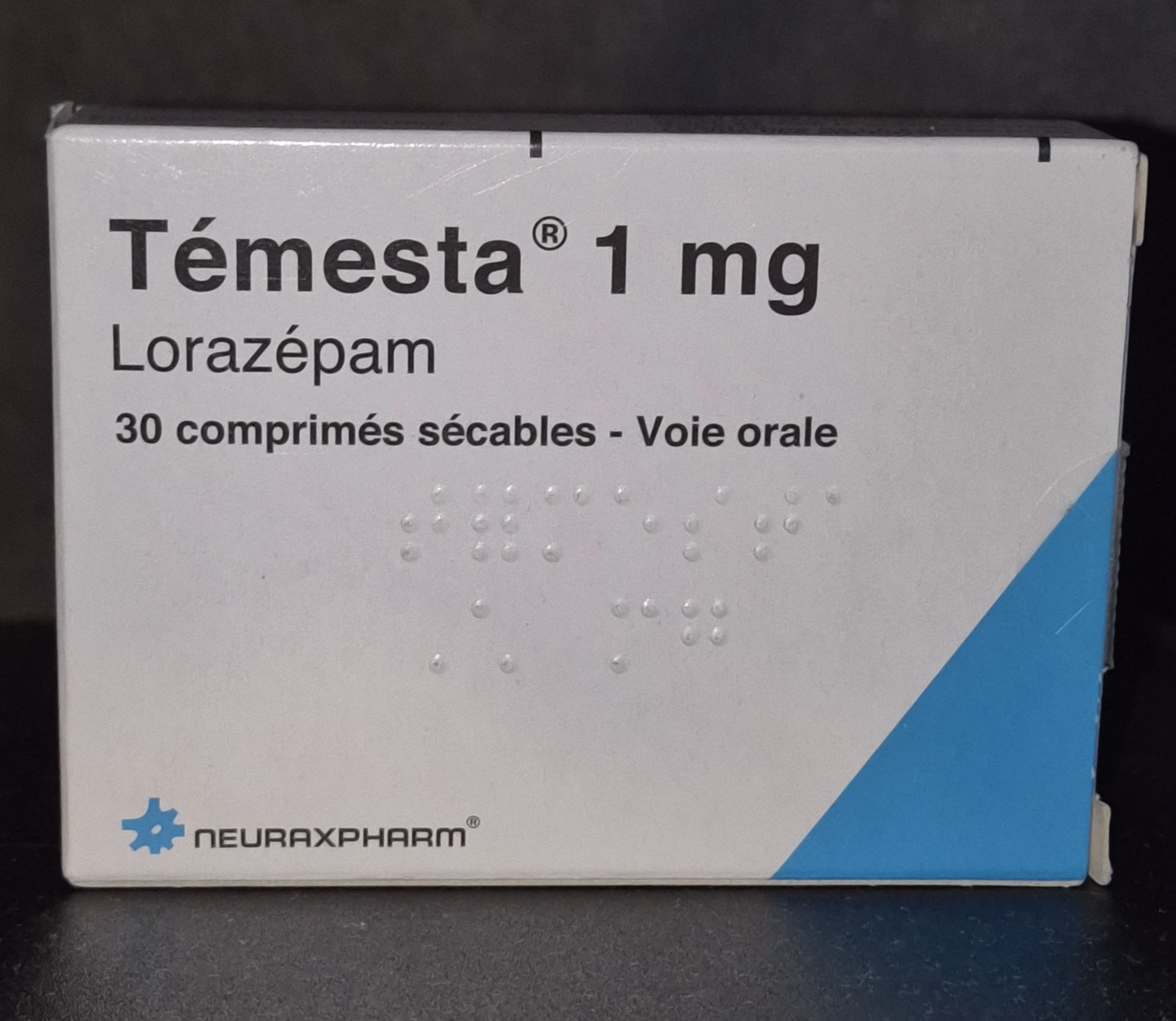
Dominique Pelicot used lorazepam (Temesta) to sedate his wife.

Dominique's abuse of Gisèle started after she was prescribed lorazepam (Temesta), an anxiolytic drug, which made her drowsy. Gisèle only took it for a short while, but Dominique took advantage of this by secretly adding pills to her food and drinks, causing her to lose consciousness. He obtained additional Temesta from his doctor; he had been prescribed 450 pills in one year alone, and was also prescribed Viagra.

While Gisèle was unconscious, Dominique committed sexual acts, such as anal sex, which his wife had not wished to participate in, or dressed her in lingerie she refused to wear. He filmed and photographed the abuse originally for his own gratification, but soon began to share the videos and photos online. To publish his material, Dominique used Coco, an unmoderated online chat website where he created a forum called à son insu ('without her knowledge'). He eventually started soliciting men to rape Gisèle.

On the forum, Dominique claimed that he and his wife shared a fetish for men having sex with her while she was asleep, and did not state outright that he drugged and abused her without her knowledge; he used the website's private messaging system to invite other men to rape his wife. Dominique, using the online alias "Marc Dorian", selected his co-perpetrators by communicating with them first on Coco, then on Skype where he detailed how they would proceed. Skype messages were found in which he boasted of drugging his wife. The final phase of Dominique's selection process was to meet his future co-perpetrator in person in his neighborhood. Once he had verified the man's identity, Dominique would set a date for the rape.

The first documented rape committed by Dominique with another man occurred on July 23, 2011 at the Pelicots' home in Villiers-sur-Marne, near Paris. The co-perpetrator was never identified. The men whom Dominique invited to rape his wife were given strict instructions to, for example, avoid smelling of fragrance or cigarette smoke, in case it alerted Gisèle to their presence. Dominique asked them to avoid "abrupt movements" (gestes brusques), as he "hated brutality". No money was exchanged. The men were not required to use condoms, and Gisèle was found to have four sexually transmitted infections after the abuse came to light. One rapist was HIV-positive; however, he was being treated and had an undetectable viral load, so he did not expose her to the virus.

By the time the Pelicots retired and settled in Mazan, Dominique had perfected his modus operandi: he kept his tranquilisers in a shoebox in their garage, switching brands because the first was too salty to be added to Gisèle's food and drink without her noticing it. Besides the tranquilisers, Dominique also fed Gisèle powerful muscle relaxants, so her body would not feel pain on the day after each rape. Dominique filmed or photographed each rape, and kept around 300 videos and pictures on a hard drive in a folder called "Abuses". Investigations showed that the number of rape videos had increased from 2016. In the videos, Dominique made obscene comments. Sex toys were sometimes used on Gisèle. In some videos, she appeared to choke when the men thrust their penises into her mouth. During his trial, Dominique said that he had raped his wife two or three times a week, either alone or with someone else.

Dominique also communicated online with men who said they were drugging and abusing their own partners. He discussed visiting them to participate in their crimes, though this did not take place. Several of these men were identified and charged in separate cases. Dominique convinced another man, Jean-Pierre Maréchal, to replicate his pattern by sedating and raping his own wife. Maréchal never went to Mazan, but instead invited Dominique at his home in Drôme. Dominique travelled there a dozen times between 2015 and 2020 to rape Maréchal's wife. On several occasions, he gave Maréchal sedatives for his next visit. Half of their attempts were unsuccessful, because Maréchal had miscalculated the doses. The media later called Maréchal Pelicot's "disciple", or "clone".

The abuse took a significant toll on Gisèle's health. She lost weight and her hair started to fall out. She experienced memory loss and at times spoke incoherently, to the extent that she worried that she might have Alzheimer's disease or a brain tumor. She only felt better when she was away from Mazan, which never raised her suspicions. She visited a number of doctors, but was always accompanied by her husband, who blamed her symptoms on exhaustion caused by looking after their grandchildren. None of the doctors suspected that she was being drugged.

Psychiatrists who later examined Dominique diagnosed him as suffering from a range of sexual and emotional disorders that included antisocial personality disorder with complete lack of empathy, egomania and several paraphilias among which sadism, exhibitionism, "obsessive fantasies" akin to necrophilia and an "abnormal sexual deviancy" that combined candaulism, voyeurism and somnophilia. One psychiatrist said that Dominique had a split personality that worked like "a partitioned computer disk": "We either have the 'normal Mr Pelicot' or the other Mr Pelicot at night, in the bedroom." A psychologist said that Dominique had trouble accepting the harm he had done, instead complaining that the trial had "destroyed his life", and that if he had not been arrested, he "would still be happy, and she too – everything would have continued the same way".

== Arrest and investigation ==
Dominique was arrested on 12 September 2020 after he had been apprehended by a security guard for upskirting women using his mobile phone at an E.Leclerc supermarket in Carpentras, near Mazan. He was interviewed by Dr. Laurent Layet, a psychiatrist who was called in to evaluate him. During the interview, Dr. Layet became suspicious of Dominique's casual attitude and how easily he dismissed his crime. Detecting a "dissonance" in his behavior and suspecting that Dominique was hiding something, he told the police that the case should be investigated further.

Dominique was released on bail pending investigation of his two mobile phones, laptop, and other digital equipment that had been seized at his home. One of the police officers had the idea to check the Skype application on one of Dominique's phones to see whether he had sent the images to someone else: he immediately found a conversation between Pelicot and one "Rasmus" (Jean-Pierre Maréchal's online alias) that alluded to a woman being drugged with anxyolitics.

Even after his first arrest, Dominique continued to invite men to rape his wife. The last abuse occurred on 22 October 2020: the man, whose alias was "le motard" ("the biker"), could not be identified. On a USB stick connected to Dominique's computer, investigators found a folder called "abuses" containing more than 20,000 images and videos of his unconscious wife being raped. The videos had been meticulously filed with explicit titles and the names of the men.

The investigators later identified 92 separate incidents of rape committed on Gisèle by 72 different men between July 2011 and October 2020. It took the police two years to identify and locate 52 of the perpetrators; the rest remain unidentified. The men were aged between 21 and 68 at the time of the rapes. Images were also found on Dominique's computer of his daughters-in-law in the shower, which had been taken with a hidden camera, and of his semi-naked daughter Caroline unconscious on a bed as if she had been drugged.

== Rearrest and confession ==
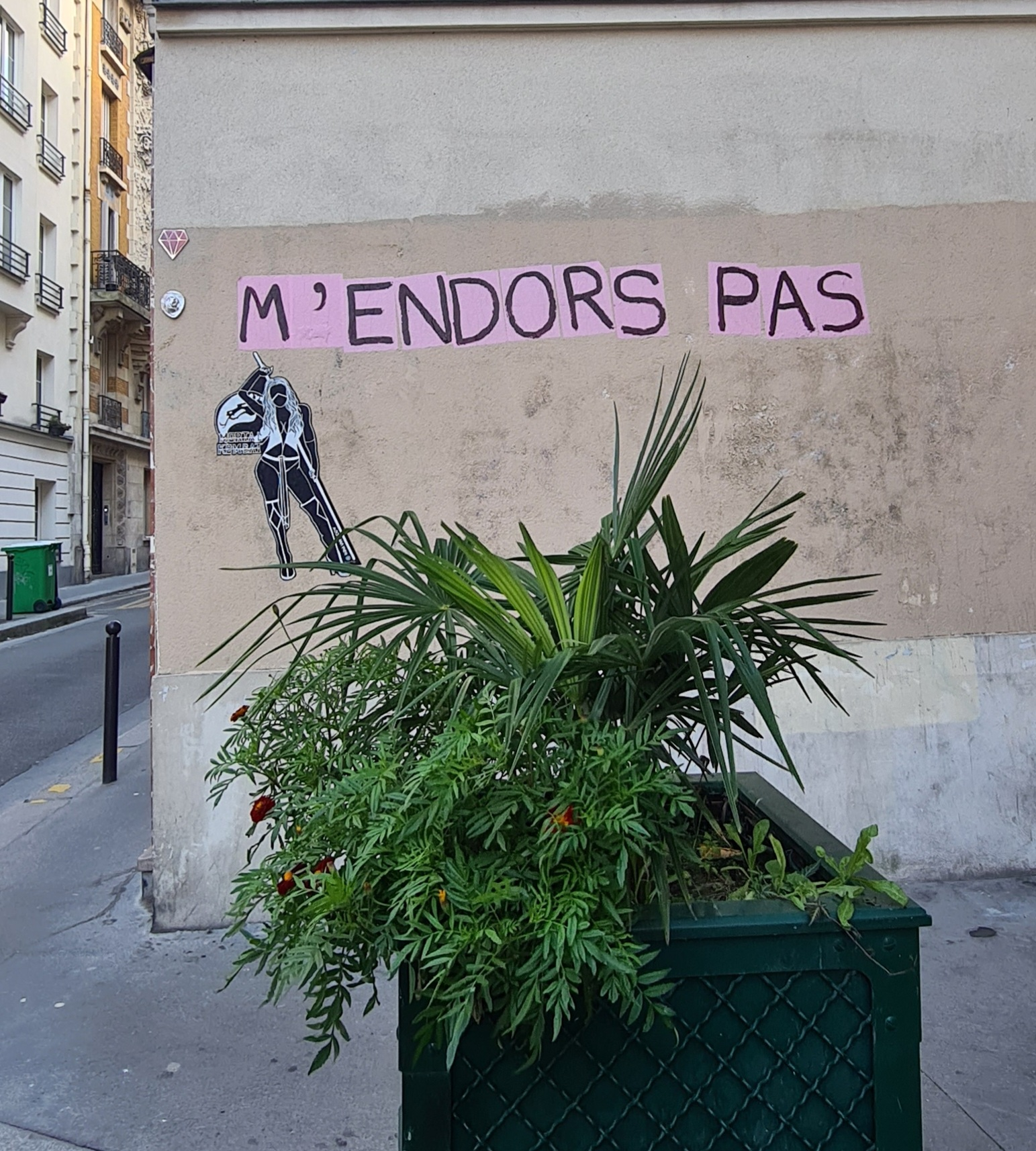
Graffiti in Paris: M'endors pas ('Don't sedate me')

Dominique was rearrested on 2 November 2020 and charged with aggravated rape, drugging, and other sexual offences. He was also accused of violating the privacy of his wife, daughter, and two daughters-in-law by covertly taking and disseminating intimate images of them. He immediately admitted his guilt.

On the same day, Gisèle was asked to attend a separate interview by the police. Questioned about her sex life, she said she had never taken part in wife swapping or threesomes. She was shown a photograph, but did not recognise the unconscious woman or the man raping her. It was only when shown further images that she recognised herself. She later testified that she had asked the police officer to stop showing her the images: "It was unbearable. I was inert, in my bed, and a man was raping me. My world fell apart."

== Indictment ==
The investigation led to three waves of arrests, in February, March and September 2021. Among the 52 co-perpetrators of Dominique who had been identified, one died shortly before he could be arrested, and another died before the trial. On 19 June 2023, Gwenola Journot, an investigating judge from the Avignon Judicial Court, published a 370-page report indicting 51 men for rape.

The accused, who faced prison sentences of up to 20 years if found guilty, ranged in age from 25 to 72, were of various ethnicities, and came from numerous walks of life – firefighter, IT worker, journalist, nurse, plumber, prison guard, soldier, and truck driver, with 41 of them being from Vaucluse. Many had partners and children. Most were charged with one count of rape, attempted rape or sexual assault but a few were charged with multiple offences, including in several cases six counts of rape. While 49 were charged with rape, one of the accused was charged with attempted rape and one with sexual assault. A total of 23 of the accused had previous convictions, including six for domestic violence and two for sexual violence. Several of them had been abused as children. Jean-Pierre Maréchal was the only one charged not for raping or assaulting Gisèle, but with drugging and raping his own wife with Dominique's participation. He said that as a child he had witnessed his father invite over strangers to rape his drunk mother, and that he had later sought to watch similar scenes.

Some of the accused admitted their guilt, whilst others claimed that the acts were consensual, with Gisèle pretending to be asleep or agreeing to be drugged, or that her husband's consent was sufficient. Five of the men were also charged with possessing images of child sexual abuse. Twelve of the accused appealed their indictment but the Court of Appeal in Nîmes rejected the appeal on 5 October 2023.

== Trial ==
The trial, heard by a panel of five judges led by presiding judge Roger Arata, began at the Judicial Court in Avignon on 2 September 2024 and was expected to last until 20 December 2024. At the request of Gisèle, the proceedings were held in public. Eighteen of the accused were detained, while 32 were attending the trial as free men and one was being judged in absentia. The courtroom was specially adapted to accommodate the large number of defendants and about sixty lawyers, with a separate transmission room for the press and public.

Gisèle, who was supported in court by her three children and represented by lawyers Stéphane Babonneau and Antoine Camus, testified during the first week of the trial. She explained that her world had fallen apart when the police had told her in November 2020 that she had been drugged and raped. She said, "I was sacrificed on the altar of vice." Her husband affirmed to the court that he was guilty of drugging and raping her. On 10 September 2024, the court heard from Jean-Pierre Maréchal, who admitted to have followed Dominique's instructions on how to drug and rape his own wife, and expressed remorse for his "repulsive" actions. Maréchal's wife did not file a complaint against him in order to protect their children.

Dominique gave evidence in court for the first time on 17 September. He admitted his guilt, as he had done since his arrest in November 2020, saying "I am a rapist like the others in this room", insisting that all accused knew what they were doing. He asked his family for forgiveness. He recounted his traumatic childhood and his own molestation. He said he had always loved his wife and had felt suicidal when he discovered she had been having an affair. However, he said that he had not abused his wife out of revenge for her past infidelity, that he had never hated her and that he still loved her "immensely". Asked why he had not stopped drugging and abusing his wife when she developed health problems caused by the drugs, he replied that his addiction had been too strong. Gisèle was given a chance to respond to her husband's evidence and said: "It is difficult for me to listen to this. For 50 years, I lived with a man who I would've never imagined could be capable of this. I trusted him completely."

The following day, Gisèle was questioned by defence lawyers, who had selected a small number of images, from the thousands on her husband's computer, that appeared to show her conscious, sometimes with a sex toy. One lawyer asked her if she was an exhibitionist. Gisèle said that she found the lawyers' questions insulting, adding: "And I understand why rape victims don't press charges." The cross examination of the remaining defendants lasted from 19 September to 19 November, with the court taking a week's break at the end of October. The court screened videos of an unconscious Gisèle being raped by the accused. Initially, for reasons of decency, presiding judge Arata had ruled to exclude journalists and members of the public from the screenings. Following arguments from Gisèle's legal team, the judge reversed his decision. Most of the accused denied the charge of rape, saying that they were unaware Gisèle was unconscious and unable to consent. Some claimed they thought they were taking part in a couple's sexual fantasy or that the husband's consent was sufficient; some claimed diminished responsibility. In the videos Gisèle was obviously unconscious and could be heard snoring. Some men made thumbs up or victory signs to the camera as they abused her.

Gisèle's three children, who were plaintiffs in the case (French: parties civiles) gave evidence on 18 November to tell of the devastation that had been wrought on their family. David spoke of a son in therapy; Florian spoke of his divorce. Caroline was convinced her father had drugged and abused her in spite of his denials, and said she felt like the forgotten victim in the case. Caroline mentioned that her relationship with her mother, Gisèle, deteriorated during the trial, to the point where she stopped speaking to her mother. However, in the end, Caroline was able to reconcile with her mother Gisèle and renew their bond.

On 19 November, Gisèle took the stand for the last time. "This is a trial of cowardice", she said, adding that it was time to examine a macho patriarchal society that trivialised rape. Whilst admitting that it was her husband who orchestrated the abuse, she asked why not one of the accused had reported him to the police when they saw the state she was in. Defence lawyers suggested that she still felt sympathy for her husband or was under his control; one of them asked why she still used her married name after her divorce, to which she replied that her grandchildren were surnamed Pelicot and she wanted them to be proud of the name that was now known across the world, as it would be associated with her, rather than just her husband.

The prosecution delivered their closing arguments on 25–27 November. Seeking a 20-year sentence for Dominique, prosecutor Laure Chabaud said that a 20-year sentence, the maximum sentence for rape under French law, was "both a lot... and too little given the gravity of the acts that were committed and repeated". Chabaud and her fellow prosecutor sought a four-year sentence for one of the accused and sentences of between 10 and 18 years for the others. Chabaud said that such sentences would send a message of hope to all victims of sexual violence. The closing arguments of the defence began on 27 November, with Dominique's lawyer, Béatrice Zavarro, the first to speak. She told the court that she had the utmost respect for Gisèle and her family, and asked them to remember the man who at one time had been a devoted family man. In a speech that quoted Sigmund Freud, John Betjeman and Boris Cyrulnik, she argued that childhood trauma had caused a split in Dominique's mind and caused his perversity.

Lawyers defending the other 50 accused delivered their closing arguments over the following two-and-a-half weeks. A common theme was the inability of the men to resist in the face of the manipulative behaviour of Dominique. The last lawyer to speak, Nadia El Bouroumi, argued for her clients' acquittal while acknowledging Gisèle's lack of consent, saying they had been manipulated by a monster. She said that it was difficult to speak for the accused when the victim was a feminist hero. On Monday 16 December, the final day of the trial, Dominique was given an opportunity to make a final statement. He acknowledged the courage of his former wife and asked again his family for their forgiveness. The rest of the accused were also allowed to speak; some had nothing to add; some said they were not rapists as they had not intended to rape; some apologised to Gisèle.

== Verdicts ==
The judges retired to chambers on the morning of 16 December 2024. Verdicts were decided by secret ballots cast by the five judges. They returned to court on the morning of 19 December to deliver the verdicts. Dominique was found guilty of all charges and received the maximum sentence of 20 years' imprisonment, with no possibility of parole before two thirds of the sentence had been served. The remaining 50 defendants were also found guilty: two of them were found guilty of aggravated sexual assault and received sentences of three years imprisonment, two were found guilty of attempted rape with aggravating factors and received sentences of five and six years' imprisonment, while the rest were found guilty of aggravated rape and received sentences ranging from five to 15 years' imprisonment.

=== Convicted ===
The following men were convicted:

| Name | Age (Note: As of December 2024) | Sentence (in years) | In jail since | Occupation | Notes |
|---|---|---|---|---|---|
| Dominique Pelicot | 72 | 20 | 4 November 2020 | Retired electrician and construction supervisor | Ex-husband of the main victim (divorced in late 2024), who organized and facilitated the rapes. Also convicted of taking and sharing intimate photos of his two daughters-in-law and his daughter, and of raping the wife of co-offender Jean-Pierre Maréchal. |
| Jean-Pierre Maréchal | 63 | 12 | 9 March 2021 | Truck driver for an agricultural cooperative | A father of six. Turned down Dominique's offer to rape Gisèle. Agreed instead to sedate and rape his own wife, which he did for five years with Dominique's participation. |
| Charly Arbo | 30 | 13 | 2021 | Temp worker | Raped Gisèle on six occasions between 2016 and 2020, including the night of her 66th birthday. Agreed to drug his own mother so he and Dominique Pelicot could rape her, but did not go through with it. |
| Cyrille Delville | 54 | 8 | | Construction worker and former amateur footballer | A father of two. Said he went along because he was sexually frustrated in his relationship. |
| Christian Lescole | 56 | 9 | 2021 | Professional firefighter | A father of two daughters. Wore his fire service uniform while raping Gisèle. Acquitted of possessing child-abuse material. |
| Lionel Rodriguez | 44 | 8 | | Supermarket salesman | Worked in the same supermarket where Dominique was caught upskirting women. Dominique brought an unsuspecting Gisèle to the supermarket so Rodriguez could get a look at her before the rape. |
| Nicolas François | 43 | 8 | | Freelance journalist | Also guilty of possessing child-abuse material. Banned from working in jobs with children for several years. |
| Jacques Cubeau | 73 | 5 (3 suspended) | | Retired: former fire officer, truck driver and pizzeria owner | Said he believed the Pelicots to be swingers; argued in court that there was no rape because he had just performed oral sex and no penetration on Gisèle. Had been married for 25 years with two children. |
| Patrice Nicolle | 55 | 8 | | Electrician | Said Dominique explained to him after the rape how he drugged Gisèle; claimed that he was outraged but did not go to the police because he felt they would not believe him. A father of two. |
| Thierry Parisis | 54 | 8 | | Mason | Turned to alcohol following the death of his 18-year-old son. Had been an inpatient in a psychiatric ward and suffering from depression when identified as a suspect. |
| Simoné Mekenese | 43 | 9 | | Construction worker | Father of five, lived near the Pelicots. He was the only defendant Gisèle recalled having met in person before the trial. Dominique had invited him home on a pretext, so he could see Gisèle before raping her. Told the court he had a complex about his penis size. Told investigators, about Gisèle and Dominique: "She's his wife, he may do whatever he likes with her." |
| Nizar Hamida | 40 | 10 | | Hairdresser, builder, and delivery driver | Had eight prior convictions, including domestic violence and attempted abduction of his child with a former partner. Said he went for a sexual encounter to celebrate the end of his bachelor days as his wife-to-be was arriving shortly from Tunisia. |
| Boris Moulin | 37 | 8 | | Transport company logistics agent | Suffered from alcohol and drug addictions following a traffic accident in 2014. |
| Jérôme Vilela | 46 | 13 | 2021 | Former firefighter and supermarket employee | Raped Gisèle six times between March and June 2020. His first visit occurred during the first COVID lockdown. Said he suffered from a sexual addiction; admitted he had been aware all along of Gisèle's lack of consent. |
| Didier Sambuchi | 68 | 5 (2 suspended) | | Retired truck driver | A bisexual man and divorced father of two. Said he had come "exclusively" for a homosexual encounter with Dominique, and Dominique duped him into believing that he and Gisèle were "roleplaying". Only performed digital penetration on Gisèle, as he suffered from erectile dysfunction due to health problems. Told Gisèle in court: “It’s not me you should be angry with, it’s your husband". |
| Quentin Hennebert | 34 | 7 | | Ambulance driver, former prison warden | Said he had realized something was wrong but did not go to the police because he was "ashamed". |
| Philippe Leleu | 62 | 5 (2 suspended) | | Gardener | Performed only digital penetration on Gisèle. Said in court, "I didn't know fingering was raping". Said he was single and regularly paid for sex. |
| Jean-Luc La | 46 | 10 | 2023 | Mirror maker | A father of four. Admitted to raping Gisèle on two occasions, in 2018 and 2019. Told the court that he thought Dominique had consented on Gisèle's behalf so "it wasn’t against the law". Dominique proposed that they rape his wife together; accepted in order to "please" Dominique but did not go through with the idea. His wife told the court, “I think because I refused him all the time, as a man, he had to look elsewhere.” |
| Fabien Sotton | 39 | 11 | 2021 | Job integration workshop employee | Sixteen prior convictions, including for domestic violence, sexual assault of a child, drug dealing and armed robbery. Was homeless for several years. |
| Karim Sebaoui | 40 | 10 | | IT specialist | Also guilty of possessing child-abuse material. |
| Joan Kawai | 26 | 10 | 16 April 2021 | French Armed Forces soldier | Youngest man on trial. Raped Gisèle twice in 2019 and 2020, missing the birth of his premature daughter on the night of the first rape in 2019. Said he did not know what consent was and only learned it in prison. |
| Jean-Marc Leloup | 74 | 6 | | Retired truck driver | Oldest of the defendants. Said he had no idea that what he did could be rape, as he thought rape was "something violent". |
| Andy Rodriguez | 37 | 6 | | Unemployed; former car mechanic, order picker, material handler, farmhand, mason's helper and supermarket receptionist | Raped Gisèle on New Year's Eve 2019, said he had nothing better to do that night as his brothers had not invited him to their party. Told the court that in his mind "she agreed to it" as "the husband had given me permission". Suffering from drug and alcohol addictions, had been convicted twice of domestic violence. |
| Vincent Coullet | 43 | 10 | | Carpenter | Raped Gisèle on two occasions, in 2019 and 2020. Had a previous conviction in 2021 for domestic violence. Said he felt no pleasure and that he had satisfied the Pelicots more than himself. |
| Adrien Longeron | 34 | 6 | | Building site manager | Raped Gisèle in 2014. Jailed for 14 years in 2020 for raping, harassing, and assaulting three former partners. Described as coming from a higher-income background than most of the other defendants. Said he had a hatred of women after discovering that he was not the biological father of the three-year-old daughter he was raising. |
| Hugues Malago | 39 | 5 | | Tiler and biker | Found guilty of attempted rape, as he could not achieve penetration. His ex-girlfriend suspected him of drug-facilitated sexual assault, but her complaint was dismissed for lack of evidence. |
| Ahmed Tbarik | 54 | 8 | | Plumber and owner of a boxing club | A father of three. Told the court "I’m not a rapist, but if I had wanted to rape I wouldn’t have chosen a 57-year-old woman, I would have chosen a pretty one." (Gisèle was 67 at the time of the rape) |
| Husamettin Dogan | 43 | 9 (10 on appeal) | | Unemployed; former construction worker | A father of one. Prior convictions for drug trafficking. |
| Romain Vandevelde | 63 | 15 | 2021 | Retired forklift driver | Raped Gisèle on six occasions between 2019 and 2020; did not use a condom even though he was HIV-positive (Gisèle was not infected). Told the court that a husband's consent was enough. |
| Joseph Cocco | 69 | 3 (2 suspended) | | Retired sales manager | The only defendant to be charged with sexual assault and not rape. Said he was tricked into thinking the Pelicots were swingers, and left after he realized Gisèle was unresponsive. Also worked for 25 years as a karate coach for the French police. |
| Saifeddine Ghabi | 37 | 3 (suspended) | | Truck driver | Told the court he failed to get an erection and only simulated sex. The video did not show clear evidence of penetration and the prosecution amended the charge to attempted rape. He was convicted of sexual assault. |
| Jean Tirano | 52 | 8 | | Roofer | Said he had regularly sought encounters with couples for over a decade. Drove two and a half hours to rape Gisèle. Said he thought Dominique had drugged him. |
| Mohamed Rafaa | 70 | 8 | 2021 | Retired DJ and club manager | Had prior conviction for raping his 17-year-old daughter, for which he was sentenced to five years' imprisonment. Raped Gisèle while the Pelicots were at their daughter's holiday home on the Île de Ré. |
| Ludovick Blemeur | 39 | 7 | | Former firefighter and warehouse worker | Raped Gisèle at her daughter's home in Saint-Rémy-lès-Chevreuse. |
| Patrick Aron | 60 | 6 | | Unemployed; former factory worker and video store owner | A gay man and divorced father of two, Aron said he had come for a sexual encounter with Dominique and was tricked into performing a sex act with Gisèle, which he did "reluctantly". |
| Abdelali Dallal | 47 | 8 | | Unemployed; former canteen worker | Raped Gisèle twice in 2018. The first encounter, as he was intoxicated his girlfriend drove him and waited for him in the car. The girlfriend told the court she thought he was meeting a couple for a sexual encounter but had not sought details because she did not want to know. |
| Grégory Serviol | 33 | 8 | | Painter and decorator | Prior convictions for theft, traffic offences, and drug use. |
| Cédric Grassot | 50 | 12 | | Software technician | Also found guilty of possessing child-abuse material. Had been found guilty of domestic violence in his youth and, in 2023, of revenge porn against two ex-partners. |
| Cendric Venzin | 44 | 9 | | Unemployed; former soldier and restaurant manager | Raped Gisèle twice, in 2016 and 2018. Prior convictions include several convictions for drunk driving. |
| Mahdi Daoudi | 36 | 8 | | Transport worker | A father of one. Said he had been tricked by Dominique into believing he and his wife were swingers. |
| Thierry Postat | 61 | 12 | 2021 | Refrigeration technician | Also guilty of possessing child-abuse and bestiality materials. Banned from working with children for life. Is a father of three. Said he had three major previous experiences where husbands invited him to have sex with their wives asleep. |
| Florian Rocca | 32 | 7 | | Delivery driver | Prior convictions for theft, driving without a license and drug offences. |
| Dominique Davies | 45 | 13 | | Truck driver, former soldier | Raped Gisèle on six occasions between 2015 and 2020. Described by Dominique as the "most complicit" of his co-perpetrators. Said that when Dominique first contacted him, he claimed to be looking for a man as a Valentine's Day "gift" for his wife. |
| Cyprien Culieras | 45 | 6 | | Forklift driver | Had eight prior convictions, mostly related to theft. |
| Mathieu Dartus | 53 | 7 | | Former baker | A father of two. Claimed to have been under the influence of MDMA on that night. |
| Cyril Beaubis | 47 | 9 | | Truck driver | Claimed he was duped by Dominique. Said he had other experiences with couples whom he met online. |
| Paul-Koikoi Grovogui | 31 | 8 | | Food processing worker | Prior convictions for theft, forgery and domestic violence. |
| Omar Douiri | 36 | 8 | | Mechanic and bus cleaner | When asked by the court if he had been concerned that Gisèle appeared to be unconscious, answered: "It was my first threesome and I didn’t know how that worked". |
| Redouane Azougagh | 40 | 9 | | Unemployed | Father of four children from two different wives. Had twenty prior convictions related to theft, death threats and domestic violence. Raped Gisèle twice in 2019. |
| Hassan Ouamou | 30 | 12 | | | Convicted in absentia having fled the country, travelling between Morocco and Romania claiming no intention of returning to France. Thirteen prior convictions in connection with theft, violence, drugs, and possession of weapons. |
| Redouane El Farihi | 55 | 8 | | Anaesthesia nurse | Claimed in court that Dominique had tricked him into believing they would be shooting "a film" while Gisèle played dead. Said he had been too terrified by Dominique to object, and that despite his professional training he did not perceive that Gisèle was unconscious because she was "moving". |

Six of the men, Joseph Cocco, Jacques Cubeau, Saifeddine Ghabi, Hugues Malago, Philippe Leleu and Didier Sambuchi, benefited from probations and time served and did not return to prison. Three, Husamettin Dogan, Abdelali Dallal and Patrick Aron, received deferred warrants of detention due to their health conditions. One, Hassan Ouamou, was sentenced in absentia.

==== Appeals ====
The defendants had 10 days – until 29 December – to lodge an appeal. The 17 who did so were scheduled to have their appeals heard before a jury at a new trial towards the end of 2025, in the Court of Appeal of Nîmes. The prosecution lodged a counter appeal, meaning the 17 appellants could see their sentences increased as well as decreased. Dominique decided not to appeal his conviction or sentence.

Eventually, 16 of the 17 men who had lodged an appeal rescinded it, leaving only one defendant to appear at a second trial. The expected duration of the appeal trial was reduced and it was scheduled to take place between October 6 and 9, 2025. The defendant, Husamettin Dogan, claimed he had been manipulated by Dominique Pelicot into believing that the sex was consensual and Gisèle would only pretend to be asleep; however, videos recorded by Dominique of the incident showed Gisèle visibly unconscious and unresponsive. Dominique, appearing as a witness, testified that Dogan knew she had not consented "from the start". Gisèle Pelicot also testified during the hearing; it was the first time she had seen her husband since the original trial. Dogan's sentence was extended from nine, to ten years as a result of the trial. He said that he would "accept" that sentence and not go to the Court of Cassation.

== Impact of the trial ==
Gisèle's decision to waive her right to anonymity and her insistence on a public trial established her as a feminist icon and raised awareness of drug-facilitated sexual assault, rape culture, and the question of consent. Media outlets from around the world covered the trial. A group of women called Amazons of Avignon (French: Les Amazones d'Avignon) plastered walls near the court with messages of support for Gisèle and applauded her as she left court each day. Blandine Deverlanges, founder of the group, said: "She has shown such dignity and courage and humanity. It was a huge gift to [French women] that she chose to speak to the whole world in front of her rapist". The BBC included her in its 2024 list of "100 inspiring and influential women from around the world".

On 14 September 2024, feminist organisations arranged protests in 30 areas throughout France to express solidarity with Gisèle and other victims of sexual violence, with 700 demonstrators at the Place de la République in Paris and 200 at the Palais de Justice in Marseille. There were further demonstrations in support of Gisèle in Paris, Lyon and other French cities in October. The trial raised issues around consent in French law and the need to revise the criminal code, which defines rape as "any act of sexual penetration committed against another person by violence, constraint, threat or surprise", with no mention of consent.

== Other allegations against Dominique Pelicot ==
While on remand, Dominique was named as a suspect in the rape and murder of 23-year-old estate agent Sophie Narme in Paris in 1991, and the attempted rape of a 19-year-old estate agent Estella B. in Villeparisis, Seine-et-Marne in 1999. Both women had been showing a man around an apartment when they were attacked. He was questioned by the cold case unit at Nanterre. Dominique initially denied both crimes but admitted the attempted rape when told that his DNA matched a sample taken at the scene. The woman had been drugged with ether but had managed to fight back and escape. The DNA match had previously been noted when he was arrested for upskirting in Collégien in 2010, but at that time the police failed to pursue the matter. Dominique continued to deny the rape and murder of Sophie Narme; a DNA sample taken from the scene had been lost. In March 2025, the Pelicots' daughter, Caroline, filed a complaint against her father for sexual abuses.

== In popular media ==
In 2022, the Pelicots' daughter, who uses the pseudonym Caroline Darian (a combination of the name of her brothers, David and Florian), published a book about the case titled Et j'ai cessé de t'appeler Papa ('And I Stopped Calling You Dad'). She also established a non-profit organisation called M'endors Pas ('Don't Sedate Me') to raise awareness of drug-facilitated sexual assault. The book was translated in English in January 2025 under the title I'll Never Call Him Dad Again. In that same month Darian recorded an interview with the BBC that was broadcast on January 11 as Pelicot Trial: the Daughter's story. She told Emma Barnett on the Today programme that she suspected her father had raped her: "I know that he drugged me, probably for sexual abuse. But I don't have any evidence".

ITN Productions and Channel 5 released a documentary on the Pelicot case titled The Pelicot Rape Case: A Town on Trial on 11 December 2024 in the UK. Caroline Darian will narrate a documentary made by France Télévisions. In 2025, "Le Procès Pelicot" ("The Pelicot Trial") a play written by Servane Dècle and Milo Rau and directed by Rau follows the trial and includes excerpts from real court documents. A version in Serbian was also played at BITEF in Belgrade in December of the same year.

In 2026, it was reported that Gisèle Pelicot’s daughter, Caroline Darian, launched a national awareness campaign, calling women who were victims of drug rape to come forward.

Canadian punk band PISS's 2026 debut album you made me / skin on linen includes "manon on the trial of gisèle pelicot", a track featuring a sample of philosopher Manon Garcia discussing the trial.

== See also ==
- Bolivian Mennonite gas-facilitated rapes
- DPP v Morgan
- Drug-facilitated sexual assault
- Elder abuse
- Joël Le Scouarnec, a case in France involving a very large number of child rapes
- Intimate partner violence
- Marital rape
- Rape by proxy
- Online Rape Academy (CNN investigation)
