= Online Rape Academy (CNN investigation) =

2025 CNN investigative report

Online Rape Academy is a phrase used for a March 2025 CNN investigative report that examined online communities allegedly involved in the commodification of sexual violence against women. The communities exchanged advice, images and videos related to drug facilitated sexual assault. The investigation looked into networks operating across many countries and reported on law enforcement efforts, digital platforms and the scope of online enabled sexual abuse.

== Background ==
The CNN investigation was published at a time the world was more focused on drug-facilitated sexual violence, following the global media coverage of the trial of French man, who repeatedly drugged and raped his wife Gisèle Pelicot, recruiting dozens of co-offenders to rape her over a decade. The CNN investigation revealed that online communities were sharing advice and tips of how to incapacitate victims, and sharing material depicting sexual assaults. According to the report participants around the world used encrypted messaging services, websites and online forums to communicate.

== Investigation ==
The CNN investigation was held in collaboration with journalists around the world, drawing digital evidence, interviews and court records. It revealed the online activities of groups where members exchanged advice about drug facilitated sexual assaults, discussed methods to identify victims and shared images and videos of rapes, assaults and more. According to CNN that the networks' members were located in multiple countries, and that law enforcement forces had since identified or opened investigations related to some of them.

== Response ==
After the CNN investigation was published, many media networks covered the investigation and its findings, creating public discussion on the findings and the implications for public safety and online moderation. In response to the investigation, organizations such as Rape Crisis England & Wales spoke out publicly, calling it further proof that tougher measures were needed to fight online facilitated sexual violence and that support for survivors must be strengthened.

Following the publication of the investigation and its finding, posts spread across social media referring to the scale of the phenomena, and the amount of online communities. Fact checking organizations claimed that the number of participants in the reported activities were exaggerated. They pointed out that this was caused by misreading the original article published by CNN.

== See also ==
- Drug-facilitated sexual assault
- Investigative journalism
- Violence against women
- Types of rape
