= Rape by proxy =

Type of rape

Rape by proxy is a type of rape where an attacker makes use of another individual to physically assault the victim.

== Types ==
=== Coercing someone to have sex with a third party ===
In September 2007 a Utah woman raised in the Fundamentalist Church of Jesus Christ of Latter-Day Saints brought to court a rape by proxy case against the church leader Warren Jeffs whom she claims coerced her to marry her 19-year-old cousin and have sex with him when she was 14 years old. Jeffs was convicted of the charge.

=== Rapist under duress ===
Persons being forced to commit rape is a phenomenon researched in the Democratic Republic of the Congo where victims of wartime rape have attested to cases of forced incestuous assault. These events mainly happen after a gang rape and entail fathers being forced to assault their daughters and sons forced to assault their mothers. Among acts of sexual violence in the Tigray War in Ethiopia and Eritrea has been reported cases of men and boys being forced to rape their family members under threats of violence or death. The Rape of Nanjing had similar events.

=== Rapist misled ===
In 2014 in Prince George's County, Maryland, a woman and her daughters became the targets of multiple attempted sexual assaults. The perpetrators were men lured to the home of the victims via fraudulent social media accounts. These fake profiles, created to impersonate the woman, actively solicited men to come to her residence to act out rape fantasies. A subsequent investigation revealed the entire operation had been orchestrated by the woman's ex-husband. Brian Frosh and Kathleen Dumais of The Baltimore Sun noted that "though her ex-husband was eventually brought to justice, prosecutors were forced to cobble together a lengthy list of charges to accumulate a sentence that would fit this novel crime" and that the phenomenon was not unique and needed new legislation to handle. They also stated that rape by proxy by misleading solicitations online was a unique type of conspiracy as "the recruiters and recruits never meet, never exchange anything of value and may never even communicate directly at all". As a result of this case the state senate passed a bill outlawing "posting information about another person advertising that they would welcome being sexually assaulted".

== See also ==
- Outline of sexual ethics
- Forced prostitution
- Strip search phone call scam
- Pelicot rape case
- Pauline Nyiramasuhuko
