= Gisèle Pelicot =

French feminist icon and serial-rape victim (born 1952)

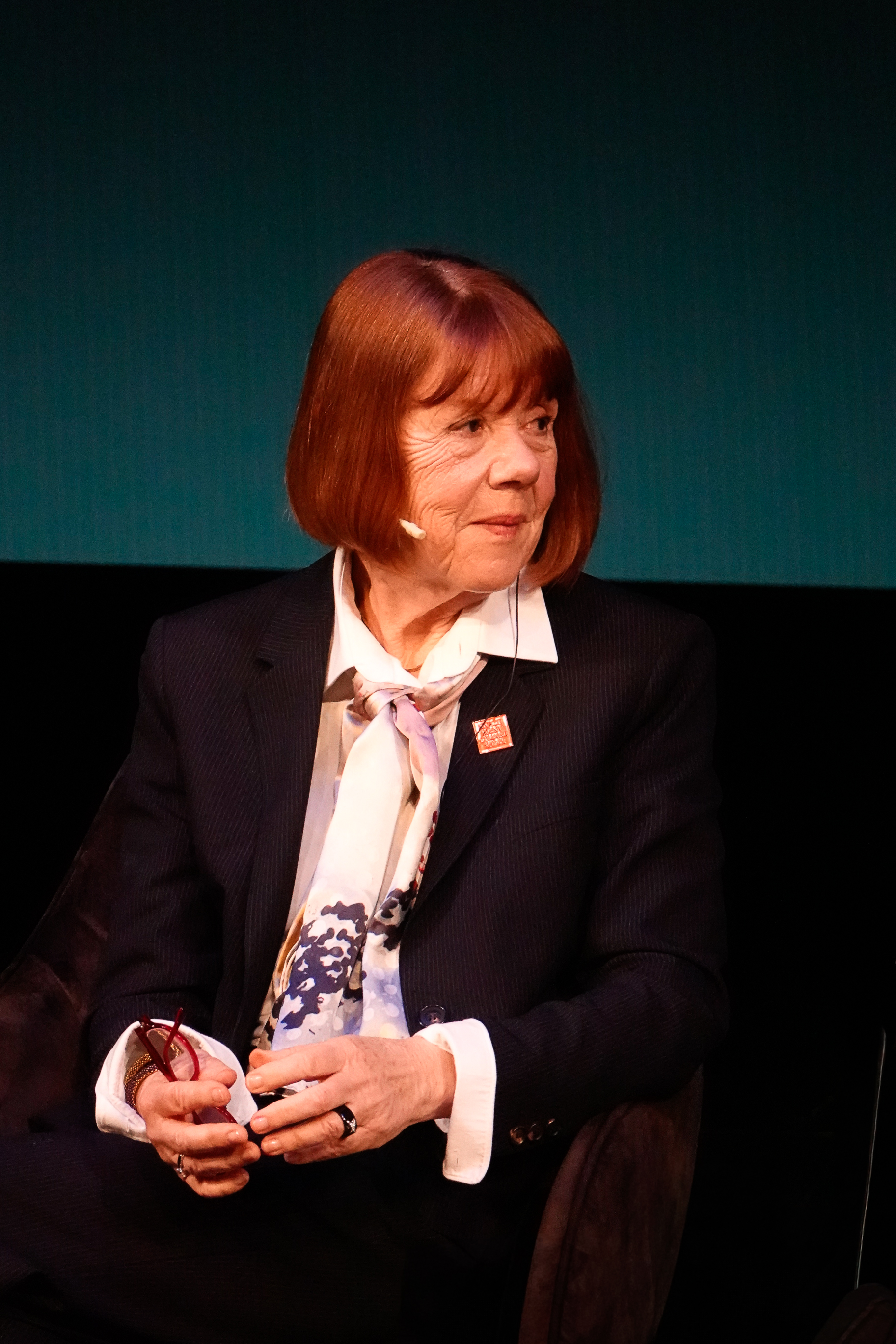
- Pelicot in 2026
- Born: Gisèle Marie Françoise Guillou; 7 December 1952 (age 73); Villingen, West Germany
- Occupations: Logistics manager, Author
- Known for: Victim in the Pelicot rape case Advocate of justice for sexual assault survivors
- Notable work: A Hymn to Life
- Spouse(s): Dominique Pelicot (m. 1973; div. 2001) (m. 2007; div. 2024)
- Children: 3

Gisèle Pelicot (Note: For consistency, and to differentiate, this article refers to her and her now ex-husband by their given names.) (French: [ʒizɛl peliko]; née Guillou, born 7 December 1952) is a French woman who became a feminist icon in 2024, when she waived her right to anonymity as the victim in a multiple rape case.

Between 2011 and 2020, she was drugged and raped by her then-husband Dominique Pelicot and dozens of other men while she was unconscious, mostly in the couple's home in Mazan. She only became aware of the abuse in 2020, when Dominique was arrested for upskirting women in a local supermarket and a police search of his computer equipment revealed images of her being raped.

The case attracted worldwide media attention, with Gisèle's courage and determination to speak out on behalf of all victims of sexual assault winning her international support and admiration. Her name was later included in the BBC's 2024 100 Women and the Financial Times list of the twenty‑five most influential women of the year. She was appointed a knight of the Legion of Honour on Bastille Day (14 July 2025). In February 2026, she published a co-written memoir.

== Background ==
Gisèle Guillou was born on 7 December 1952 in the city of Villingen, in the southern part of West Germany, where her father was serving in the French Army. She arrived in France when she was five; her mother died of cancer when she was nine. In 1971, she met her future husband, Dominique Pelicot. They married in April 1973 and lived in several places in the Paris metropolitan area. A son, David, and a daughter, Caroline, were born in the early years of their marriage; they were followed by another son, Florian, born in 1986.

Gisèle worked in administration for the state electricity company. Dominique worked as an electrician and an estate agent, and also set up a number of businesses which ultimately failed. It was Gisèle's more stable career that maintained the family's standard of living. She had a three-year affair with a married colleague in the mid-1980s. In 1987, this caused the Pelicots to separate and sell their family home. They later reconciled and resumed their life together. In 1990, Dominique in turn had an affair and lived with another woman for several months before the couple reconciled again.

In 2001, Gisèle and Dominique divorced to protect their assets from Dominique's creditors after his business failures. They continued to live together and remarried in 2007. In 2010, Dominique was caught upskirting women in a supermarket near Paris and accepted a €100 fine to avoid a court case. Gisèle remained unaware of the incident.

After retiring in 2013, the Pelicots moved to Mazan in southeastern France, renting a house with a garden and swimming pool. Gisèle joined a choir, while Dominique joined the local tennis club and went out cycling. During the summer holidays, they were joined by their children and grandchildren.

== Abuse and discovery ==
While the couple were still living in the Paris area, Gisèle was prescribed Temesta (lorazepam), a benzodiazepine. Dominique took advantage of her drugged state to rape her while she was asleep. He began adding sleeping pills obtained from his own doctor to her food and drink to render her unconscious. He then invited men he contacted on the internet to rape her while she was drugged. The first such assault recorded by Dominique took place in July 2011, while the couple were living in Villiers-sur-Marne near Paris; the perpetrator was never identified.

Gisèle experienced memory lapses due to the drugs. She feared she might have Alzheimer's disease or a brain tumour, but medical tests were negative. She had suspicions and once asked Dominique whether he was drugging her, but accepted his denial and remained unaware that she was being drugged and raped.

After Dominique was arrested for upskirting women in a local supermarket in September 2020, police discovered images of an unconscious Gisèle being raped by her husband and dozens (Note: The exact number of men who raped Gisèle is not known; some sources give a figure of at least 72, others of at least 83.) of other men on computer equipment seized from the couple's home. Gisèle later recalled her reaction when, on 2 November 2020, she and Dominique were summoned to the police station and she was shown images of her abuse: "Everything caved in, everything I built for 50 years." Dominique was remanded in custody. Between his arrest in September and being taken into custody on 2 November, he had continued to invite men to rape her.

Following Dominique's detention, Gisèle moved out of the family home and initiated divorce proceedings. She did not see him again until his trial in September 2024. The divorce was finalised days before the trial. While Dominique was in pre-trial custody, Gisèle learnt that he was linked to attacks on women in the 1990s. He admitted to an attack on a young estate agent in 1999, but denied the rape and murder of another young estate agent in 1991.

== Trial ==
The trial of Dominique and fifty other men identified from the computer images began in Avignon in September 2024. As a rape victim, Gisèle had the right to anonymity and to a trial held in private, but she waived anonymity and insisted on a trial held in public in order to raise awareness of drug-facilitated sexual assault (chemical submission) and encourage other victims of sexual violence to speak out. She successfully challenged the judge's initial decision to exclude the public from court when videos of her being raped were shown. "The shame is theirs", she said of the men accused of raping her. "I'm lucky to have the evidence. I have the proof, which is very rare. So, I have to go through [all this] to stand for all the victims," she said of the videos. When described as brave, she replied: "I say it's not bravery, it's will and determination to change society." Though she was now divorced and had reverted to her maiden name, Gisèle used her former married name throughout the trial. When asked by a defence lawyer why she retained her husband's name, she said that it was so that her grandchildren should not be ashamed of their name.

Gisèle testified that her illusions about her marriage had been shattered when, in November 2020, police showed her images recovered from Dominique's computer equipment of her being raped. Before seeing the images, she had described her husband to investigators as a "super guy". She had believed their marriage was strong despite its past difficulties. She told the court that she had been happy in the marriage. Under cross‑examination, she said: "Our friends used to say we were the perfect couple. And I thought we would see our days through together." Dominique admitted that he was a rapist and said that the other men on trial, most of whom denied rape, were also rapists. He professed his love for Gisèle and asked for forgiveness.

On 19 December 2024, Dominique was convicted of aggravated rape and given the maximum twenty‑year sentence. Of the remaining fifty co‑defendants, forty‑nine were found guilty of committing aggravated rape, attempted rape, or sexual assault against Gisèle, and were sentenced to between three and fifteen years' imprisonment. One man was found guilty of having drugged and raped his own wife with Dominique, but was not charged with any offence against Gisèle. Seventeen of those convicted lodged appeals, although sixteen had withdrawn them by June 2025. Dominique did not appeal; his lawyer said he did not wish to impose another ordeal on Gisèle or risk further charges and a longer sentence.

Speaking on 19 December after the verdicts, Gisèle said:

I wanted when I started on 2 September to ensure that society could actually see what was happening and I never have regretted this decision. I now have faith in our capacity collectively to take hold of a future in which everybody, women, men, can live together in harmony, in respect and mutual understanding.

Gisèle was represented at the trial by lawyers Antoine Camus and Stéphane Babonneau. Camus had been introduced to her by an acquaintance and, as his background was in civil rather than criminal law, he asked Babonneau, a criminal lawyer, to join him. The pair also represented Gisèle's daughter and two daughters‑in‑law, who were civil parties (French: parties civiles) in the case because Dominique had taken illicit photographs of them. In March 2025, Camus and Babonneau received an equality award from the Spanish Bar Association.

Following the trial, justice minister Gérald Darmanin ordered an investigation into failures by police to act on information that might have spared Gisèle her ordeal. When Dominique was arrested for upskirting women in 2010, a DNA sample taken from him matched a sample recovered at the scene of an attempted rape in 1999, but the match was not pursued. The inquiry will also examine how a DNA sample taken from the scene of a rape and murder in 1991 was lost.

On 5 October 2025, Gisèle returned to court in Nîmes for the retrial of the man who had appealed his rape conviction. She gave evidence under her maiden name of Guillou. The appeal was unsuccessful and the appellant's sentence was increased from nine to ten years' imprisonment. While giving evidence, Gisèle spoke about how, since the original trial, she had become estranged from her daughter, who had accused her father of abusing her and her mother of being unsupportive. Gisèle said she hoped they would be reconciled. She also said she did not wish to be regarded as an icon, and offered her support to other victims of rape, saying they should not feel ashamed of what had been done to them.

== Recognition and impact ==
Gisèle Pelicot on the front page of British newspapers, 20 December 2024

Gisèle's decision to waive her anonymity and to have the trial held in public, together with her composed demeanour throughout the proceedings, led to widespread public support. She left court each day to applause from people gathered outside; her image appeared in street art, and supportive slogans were pasted on walls around the courthouse. She received letters of support from all over the world, including one from Queen Camilla of the United Kingdom. The Australian Older Women's Network, which raises awareness of sexual assaults against older women, sent her a scarf made by Aboriginal women, which she wore frequently to court. Speaking through her lawyer, Gisèle said she had been touched by the gift and by the sense of solidarity among women confronting violence. Demonstrations were held in her support, and she became a feminist figurehead.

After the verdict, supporters thanked her for her bravery and celebrated the sentence handed down to her former husband. She was thanked by French president Emmanuel Macron for her "dignity and courage", and applauded on X by foreign leaders including German chancellor Olaf Scholz and Spanish prime minister Pedro Sánchez. On 20 December, the day after the verdicts, she appeared on front pages of newspapers across Europe. On the same day, British journalist Catherine Mayer launched a petition calling for her to receive the Nobel Peace Prize.

Gisèle was included on the BBC's 2024 list of 100 women, and was cited as one of the twenty‑five most influential women of 2024 by the Financial Times. In January 2025, she was named personality of the year in a French opinion poll, narrowly ahead of Donald Trump. She was also named one of Time's Women of the Year for 2025.

On 17 April 2025, the magazine Paris Match published photographs of Gisèle with a man described as her new partner. The photographs had been taken without her permission, and she had not been warned of their forthcoming publication. Through her lawyer, Babonneau, she said she was considering legal action against the magazine. Babonneau said: "She is a rape victim who became a public figure in spite of herself, and who particularly deserves the right of respect for her private life". The case was settled before coming to court in June 2025, with the magazine agreeing to donate €40,000 to two associations supporting victims of violence, particularly women and children. Gisèle had not sought any compensation for herself.

== Honours and awards ==
Gisèle was one of three nominees shortlisted for the 2025 Vigdís Prize for Women's Empowerment.

In May 2025, she was voted winner of Normandy's Prix Liberté by 10,000 young people from eighty‑four countries.

On 14 July 2025 (Bastille Day), Gisèle was one of 497 people to be named a knight of the Legion of Honour.

On 16 April 2026, she received the Freedom from Fear award, one of the Four Freedoms Awards, at a ceremony in Middelburg in the Netherlands.

Gisèle received the woman of courage award at the Women of the Year Lunch in London on 12 October 2026. She said that she accepted the award for all women victims of sexual violence.

== Memoir ==
In March 2025, Gisèle announced that she was working on a memoir. She said:

I am immensely grateful for the extraordinary support I have received since the beginning of the trial. I now want to tell my story in my own words. Through this book, I hope to convey a message of strength and courage to all those who are subjected to difficult ordeals. May they never feel shame. And in time, may they even learn to savour life again and find peace.

The book, Et la joie de vivre, written under the name of Gisèle Pelicot with journalist and novelist Judith Perrignon, was published by Flammarion in a worldwide release in 22 languages on 17 February 2026. The English translation has the title A Hymn to Life: Shame Has to Change Sides.

Gisèle gave her first media interviews in the run-up to the publication of her memoir. On 15 February 2026, an interview with Victoria Derbyshire was broadcast by the BBC on Newsnight. Gisèle spoke about her childhood, her marriage, the "descent into hell" when she discovered the abuse her husband had inflicted on her, her decision to waive her right to anonymity, the support she received from other women, the estrangement from her daughter, and finding new love. She was also interviewed by Seth Doane for CBS News and Lulu Garcia-Navarro for The New York Times.

On 20 February 2026, Gisèle launched the English edition of her memoir at an event at the Royal Festival Hall in London. On 23 February, she and her partner, Jean‑Loup Agopian, were invited to tea with Queen Camilla at Clarence House. In May 2026, Gisèle, accompanied by her daughter, appeared at the Hay Festival. At the end of an interview by Helena Kennedy, she received a standing ovation.

A Hymn to Life was a Finalist for the 2026 Kirkus Prize for Nonfiction.
