= Mazan =

Mazan Masan (Occitan)
- Commune
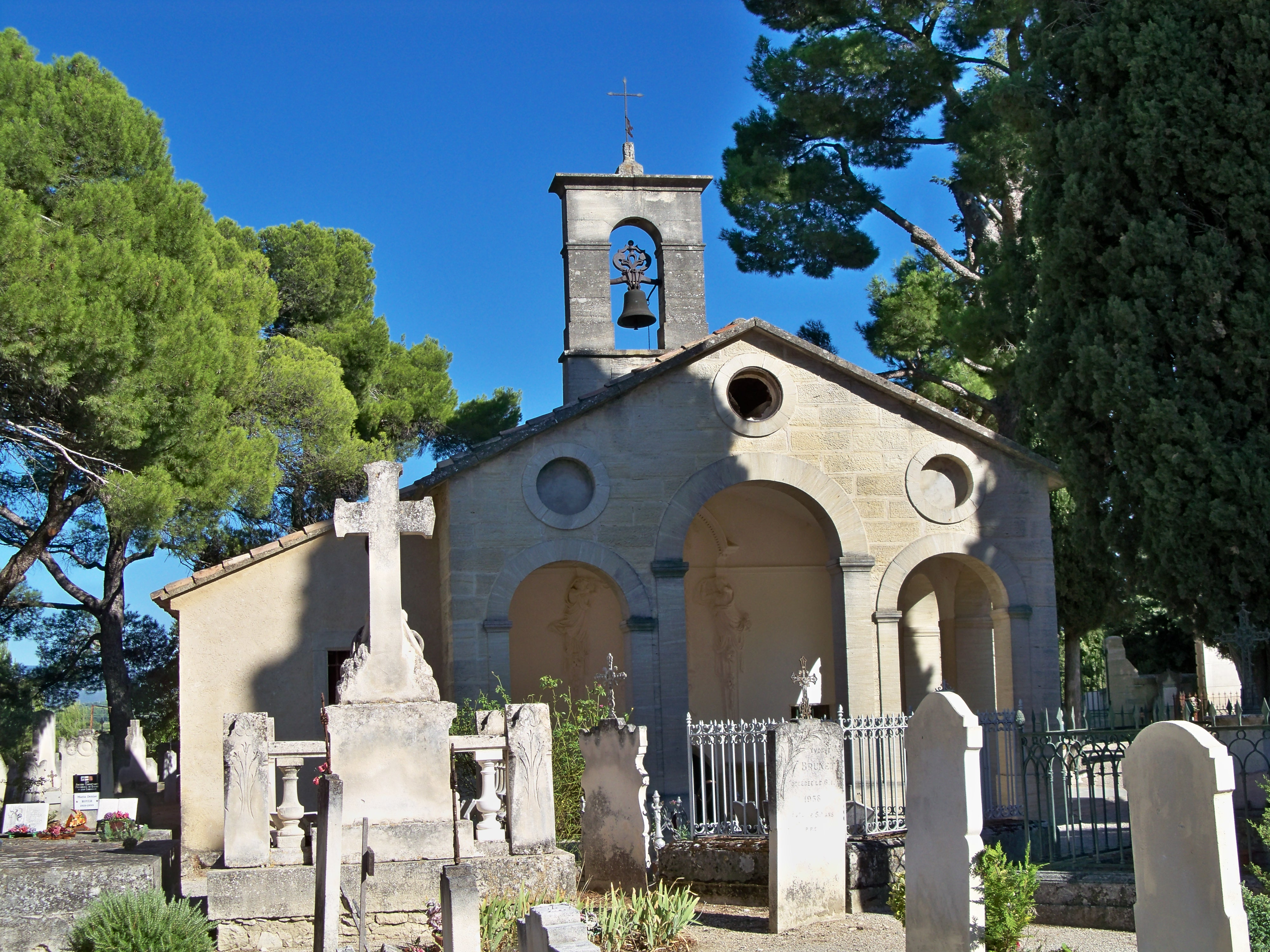
- Chapel Notre-Dame of Pareloup

- Coat of arms
- Location of Mazan
- Location within France Location within Provence-Alpes-Côte d'Azur
- Coordinates: 44°03′27″N 5°07′44″E
- Country: France
- Region: Provence-Alpes-Côte d'Azur
- Department: Vaucluse
- Arrondissement: Carpentras
- Canton: Pernes-les-Fontaines
- Intercommunality: CA Ventoux-Comtat Venaissin

Government
  - Mayor (2020–2026): Louis Bonnet
- Area^{1}: 37.92 km^{2} (14.64 sq mi)
- Elevation: 197 m (646 ft)
- Highest elevation: 450 m (1,480 ft)
- Lowest elevation: 111 m (364 ft)
- Population (2023): 6,285
  - Density: 165.7/km^{2} (429.3/sq mi)
- Time zone: UTC+01:00 (CET)
  - Summer (DST): UTC+02:00 (CEST)
- INSEE/Postal code: 84072 /84380
- ^{1} French Land Register data, which excludes lakes, ponds, glaciers > 1 km^{2} (0.386 sq mi or 247 acres) and river estuaries.

Mazan (French pronunciation: [mazɑ̃]; Occitan: Masan) is a commune in the Vaucluse department in the Provence-Alpes-Côte d'Azur region in southeastern France.

== Geography ==
The town is seven kilometres (4 1/2 miles) by road east of Carpentras, one of its neighbouring municipalities, and 34 kilometres (21 mi) by road from Avignon.

The town is located in the heart of the former Comtat Venaissin, near the south side of Mont Ventoux.

== Features ==
Mazan is home to one of the châteaux of the de Sade family. Today this château is a luxury hotel.

== Population ==
Historical population
Year	Pop.	±% p.a.
1968	2,320	—
1975	2,896	+3.22%
1982	3,729	+3.68%
1990	4,459	+2.26%
1999	4,943	+1.15%
2007	5,515	+1.38%
2012	5,804	+1.03%
2017	6,036	+0.79%
2023	6,285	+0.68%
Source: INSEE

== Education ==
There is a preschool (maternelle), École maternelle Mamé Blanc - La Condamine, an elementary school, École élémentaire Gilbert Laget - La Condamine, a mixed preschool and elementary school, École Saint Dominique, and a junior high school (collège), Collège André Malraux.

== Notable residents ==
- Gisèle Pelicot

== See also ==
- Communes of the Vaucluse department
- Mazan rapes case
