= Drug-facilitated sexual assault =

Method of sexual assault

Table from the 2010 DrugScience study ranking various drugs (legal and illegal) based on statements by drug-harm experts. This study rated alcohol the most harmful drug overall, and the only drug more harmful to others than to the users themselves.

Drug-facilitated sexual assault (DFSA) is sexual assault (rape or otherwise) carried out on a person after the person has become intoxicated due to being under the influence of any mind-altering substances, such as having consumed alcohol or been intentionally administered another date rape drug. 75% of all acquaintance rapes involve alcohol and/or drugs. Drugs, when used with or without alcohol, result in a loss of consciousness and a loss of the ability to consent to sex.

Researchers have found that alcohol-facilitated rape is the most common form of sexual violence against women. As with other types of rape, DFSA is a crime of physical violence, and can be a result of sexual hedonism and entitlement. Most victims of DFSA are women and most perpetrators are men.

== History ==
Sexual assaults of men and women who have voluntarily consumed alcohol or drugs is common and not new, being mentioned in the 1938 film Pygmalion. It is also not new to slip something into somebody's drink to incapacitate them (see Mickey Finn). However, in the mid-1990s, law enforcement agencies began to see a pattern of women having been surreptitiously drugged for the purpose of sexual assault and rape using date rape drugs: odorless, tasteless incapacitating drugs that may produce anterograde amnesia. The female victim, consuming alcoholic drinks, whether coerced or in a mutually relaxed environment, would find herself suddenly losing awareness of her surroundings. Upon regaining consciousness, hours later, she may be in a different location, with signs of having been sexually interfered with, such as missing or disarranged clothing, bruises, the presence of semen, or vaginal or anal soreness. She may feel after-effects of substance use such as wooziness, weakness or confusion, and little or no memory of what had happened to her. In some cases, her attacker may be gone; in others, he may behave as though nothing unusual has occurred, perhaps offering to drive her home or to a hospital.

== Profiling ==
=== Scenarios ===
Most DFSAs are similar to non-drug-facilitated date rape, but not all. DFSAs may occur between employers and employees, particularly in situations where an employee is vulnerable, for example because they are an undocumented worker or for some other reason cannot risk losing their job. In such circumstances, researchers say an employer may take a vulnerable employee to dinner, and then drug and sexually assault the victim. DFSAs may also occur between landlords and tenants, or between small business owners and their clients. In those cases, researchers say the perpetrator is often socially inept, living alone, with poorly established intimacy with others. DFSAs may occur in a healthcare context such as a dentist's or doctor's office, often for the purpose of anaesthesia. Finally, they may also occur inside families, with the perpetrator for example raping a child or other vulnerable family member.

Male-on-male DFSAs occur almost exclusively in social or school settings, such as men raping foster sons, men picking up hitchhikers, and sadomasochistic killers such as Jeffrey Dahmer and John Wayne Gacy who immobilized their victims through sedation before sexually assaulting and murdering them. Most DFSA perpetrators work alone, but some work with accomplices, including male friends, a male and female couple, and brothers. A female accomplice may be used to help gain the trust of an intended female victim. In 1990, Canadian serial rapist and future murderer Paul Bernardo and his then-girlfriend Karla Homolka drugged the latter's younger sister Tammy with diazepam before Bernardo raped her; one year later they raped Tammy again after drugging her with halothane which Karla obtained from the veterinary clinic where she worked, and Tammy subsequently choked to death on her own vomit.

==== Psychedelic Facilitated Sexual Assault ====
Psychedelic facilitated sexual assault (PFSA) is a subcategory of DFSA. Under the influence of many psychedelics, individuals are as susceptible to suggestion as they are during hypnosis. Experts believe that this is at least partially why individuals (specifically women) with a history of sexual violence in their life are particularly vulnerable to PFSA. Often PFSA is perpetrated by an individual who provided the psychedelics to the "journeyer". In those cases where PFSA includes sexual penetration, it is sometimes referred to as shamanic rape, because the perpetrator is allegedly acting as a shaman.

=== Perpetrators ===
According to law enforcement officials, DFSA perpetrators generally share four characteristics: they have access to sedating drugs and understand their effects, they have access to a setting (often a home or workplace) where the rape will not be interrupted while in progress, they are able to establish at least a small amount of trust with an intended victim, and they have a plan to avoid arrest and prosecution which may involve re-dressing the victim, telling the victim they had consensual sex or that no sexual contact took place, or exiting the premises before the victim regains consciousness. Researchers say that DFSA perpetrators are opportunistic and non-confrontational. They ordinarily do not threaten, force, batter or mutilate their victims, nor do they carry weapons, steal from their victims or destroy their property. They tend not to have a history of physical violence. They are often invested in their careers or communities: they are not generally culturally marginalized.

Some researchers say that DFSA perpetrators are highly sexually interested but unable to find sexual partners, and are motivated solely by sexual desire. Others say some perpetrators (who may record the rape for later viewing) are motivated by the idea of dominating and controlling somebody for sexual purposes. Researchers differ over whether perpetrators are satisfying an actual compulsion. Some believe there is little evidence to suggest the urge to commit DFSA is uncontrollable, while others say the "astonishing frequency" with which some perpetrators repeat the offence suggests some degree of compulsion. All DFSA perpetrators have a very high likelihood of reoffending.

The stereotype of DFSA perpetrators is that they are personable, clever and attractive. This is sometimes but not always true. Because drugging the victim makes it possible to easily overpower him or her, it is possible for perpetrators to commit DFSA quite late in life, and researchers say some perpetrators are over the age of 60.

=== Organised drug-facilitated sexual assault ===
Following the Pelicot rape case police attention was drawn to finding similar cases. In 2026 the British National Crime Agency announced that it had been investigating a network of online forums supporting orgnaized drug-facilitated sexual assault (ODFSA). Europol announced that 156 victims and perpetrators had been identified by a pan-European investigation, together with four new online communities.

As part of this investigation, British police identified eight new cases of apparent drug-facilitated sexual assault.

=== Victims ===
Different types of drugs and alcohol have different outcomes in terms of the body's consciousness, but all drugs inhibit the ability to consent. This experience can often be traumatic to DFSA victims. One study of American women who believed they were victims of DFSAs found 81% knew the alleged perpetrator before the rape. A similar study focused on college students found 83% knew the alleged perpetrator before the rape.

== Crime reports, prosecution, and statistics ==
If reported, the presence of date rape drugs can be detected in various ways after the event, notably through urine samples (for some days) and in the hair (for weeks or even months). However, the main impediment to actual statistics is the confusion and lack of memory induced by these drugs. It is impossible to know how frequently DFSA occurs because victims themselves are left unsure what happened to them, whether if anything has happened, whom with or how, or the usually clear facts needed to make a proper report. Therefore, incidents are less likely to be reported. Due to the corresponding amnesic effects and cognitive impairment associated with date rape drugs, self-reporting by victims is an unreliable source of statistical data since many victims have no idea what has happened to them. Any attribution or classification is conjecture without specialized drug toxocology which is often unavailable to victims within the short time frame when viable testing of samples has historically been available.

The drugs are also difficult to detect. Because of the very small amounts of drugs typically administered to achieve these effects, it is difficult to test for the presence of these drugs since they are quickly eliminated from the body. The lack of confirmation through toxicology cannot necessarily be equated being empirical data of itself.

Consuming alcohol is a major risk factor for date rape. One study of 1,179 urine specimens from victims of suspected DFSAs in 49 American states found six (0.5%) positive for Rohypnol, 97 (8%) positive for other benzodiazepines, 451 (38%) positive for alcohol and 468 (40%) negative for any of the drugs tested for. A similar study of 2,003 urine samples of victims of suspected DFSAs found less than 2% tested positive for Rohypnol or GHB. A three-year study in the UK found two percent of 1,014 rape victims had sedatives detected in their urine 12 hours after the assault. A 2009 Australian study found that of 97 instances of patients admitted to hospital believing their drinks might have been spiked, tests were unable to identify a single case where a sedative drug was likely to have been illegally placed in a drink in a pub or nightclub, with 9 plausible cases from within the study. In contrast, the mean blood ethanol concentration (BAC) of patients at the time of presentation was 0.096%. One study (Ham & Burton, 2005), found out of 1014 cases of claimed drug-facilitated sexual assault over a three-year period in the UK, only 2% (21 cases) showed evidence of possible deliberate spiking.

A UK study concluded that there was "no evidence to suggest widespread date rape drug use" in the UK and that no cases in 120 examined involved rohypnol and just two involved GHB.

== Criminal justice system and prosecution ==
=== Crime reporting and investigation ===
It is less likely for a DFSA victim to report their rape at all, particularly if the victim is still suffering the physical or mental after-effects of the drug they were given, or even unsure of what exactly happened. Victims are often reluctant to report because they do not clearly remember or understand what happened to them. Victims who were raped after willingly consuming alcohol or drugs are particularly reluctant because they may be charged for having used a substance illegally. Nearly all rape victims have an intense fear of being blamed for their assault but particularly DFSA victims, and they may feel shame or guilt. They also may want to protect their friends, particularly if they are very young.

Investigators are trained to focus on determining whether a sexual act took place that met the local legal definition of rape or sexual assault, determining whether the victim was under the influence of alcohol or drugs and thus could not give willful consent, determining whether or not there were witnesses, identifying the alleged perpetrator, and determining if they had access to drugs suspected to have been used in the DFSA.

=== Evidence and detection ===
Successful prosecution is likelier if there is physical evidence for a victim having been drugged. Because most of the substance will have become metabolized and eliminated from the body after 72 hours, successful detection of the presence of drugs is significantly decreased after this time period, potentially resulting in a false negative. In an ideal scenario, the test is performed on the first urine the victim produces after the assault. One clue as to which of benzodiazepines or GHB might have been used in a DFSA is the effect on the victim's urination: benzodiazepines lead to urinary retention and GHB to urinary incontinence.

Urine is not the only means of detecting such drugs in the body. Medical authorities may also take samples of the victim's blood, and especially their hair, as this can show evidence for weeks or months, rather than days. Hair samples are typically taken 14 days after exposure to the drug (although they may be taken as early as 24 hours), to allow for absorption of the drug into the hair with growth of the hair. Testing of hair can therefore extend the window for date rape drug detection to weeks or even months.

Most laboratories do not perform a broad drug screen. Successful choice of specific drugs to test for may be facilitated by a descriptive statement by the victim regarding the effects of the drug. Recent recreational use of drugs may be detected in the drug screen, and impact on the victim's credibility may be mitigated through pre-disclosure.

In the United States, law enforcement agencies generally pay for the drug testing if it is requested by them as part of a rape kit. Insurance commonly refuses to pay for tests performed upon the request of victims, necessitating that they pay for it themselves. Testing kits for detection of certain drugs in drinks prior to consumption are commercially available but as of 2002 were assessed as being unreliable.

=== Prosecution and punishment ===
Prosecution of all rape is difficult, but DFSA particularly so. Because many DFSA victims experience anterograde amnesia as a result of the drugs they were given, they are unable to understand or describe what happened to them. Because the perpetrator immobilized the victim using drugs, they were unable to attempt to physically defend themselves, which means there will be no evidence such as fingernail scrapings, scratches or bite marks. And, if the victim was consuming alcohol or other drugs voluntarily, law enforcement officials and jurors are much less likely to believe what they say, and are more likely to blame them for having been victimized.

Researchers say that perpetrators of DFSA never confess, and that appeals to their conscience do not work. In the state of Connecticut, drug facilitated sexual assault is considered rape, therefore the offender will be charged, if found guilty, with sexual assault in the first degree which is a class B felony. However, if the victim is under the age of 16 years of age then the offender will be charged with a class A felony. 2024 saw a notable case of DFSA end with conviction, as the judges in the Pelicot rape case ruled a maximum sentence of 20 years' imprisonment against Dominique Pelicot.

== Popular culture ==
The 2011 Australian drama film Sleeping Beauty depicts drug-facilitated sexual assault.

== See also ==
- Mickey Finn (drugs)
- Death of Samantha Reid
- Bill Cosby sexual assault cases
- Reynhard Sinaga
- Pelicot rape case
- Online Rape Academy (CNN investigation)
