= Ibadan =

Capital city of Oyo State, Nigeria

Ibadan Ìbàdàn (Yoruba)
- City and Metropolis
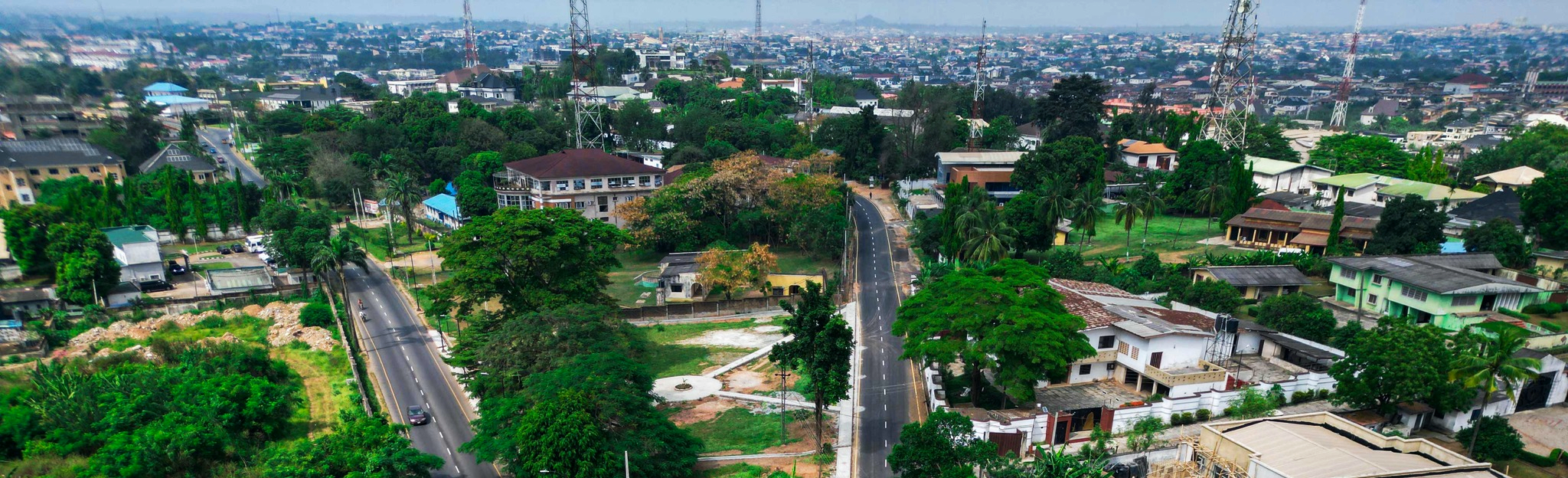
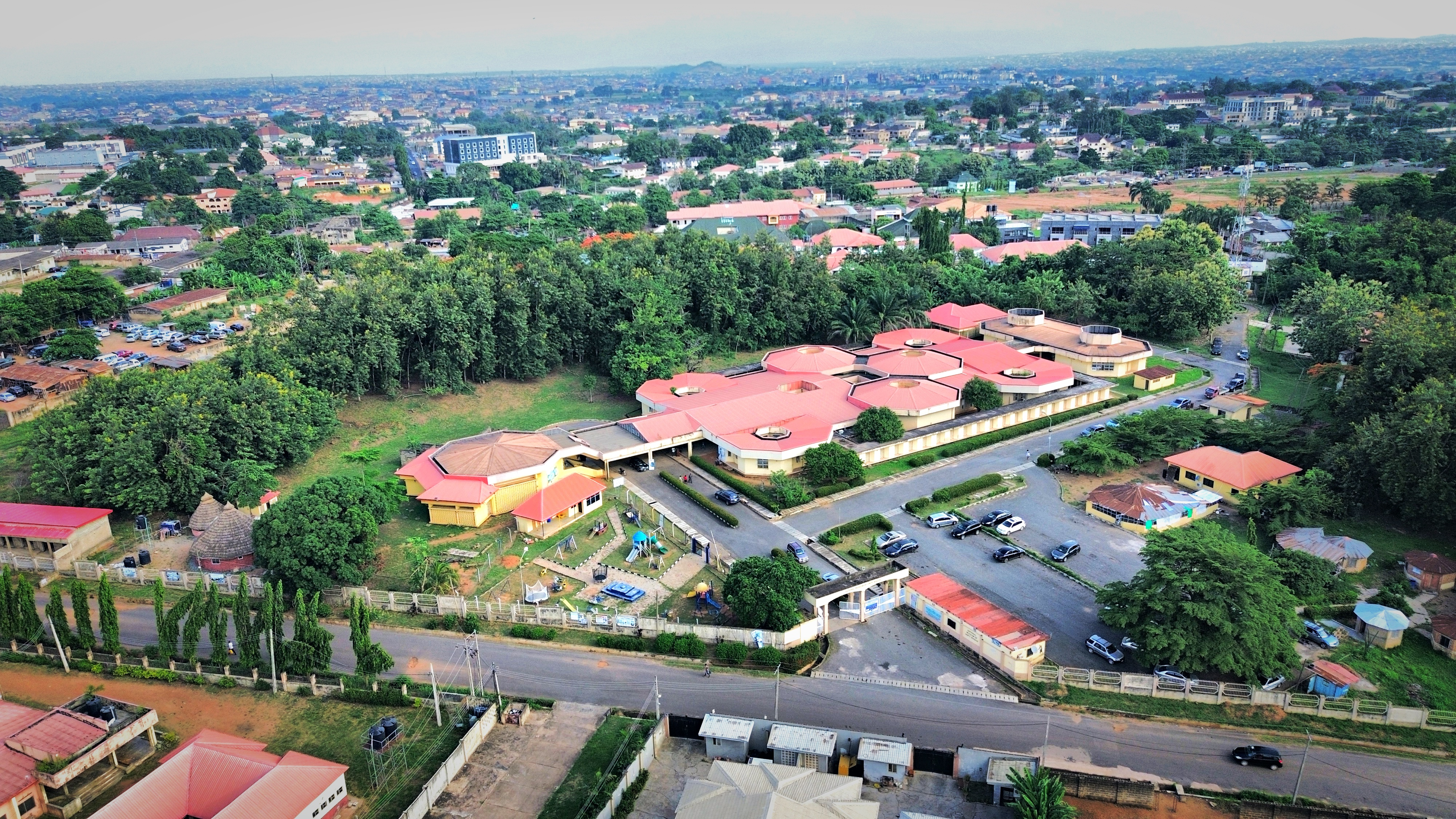
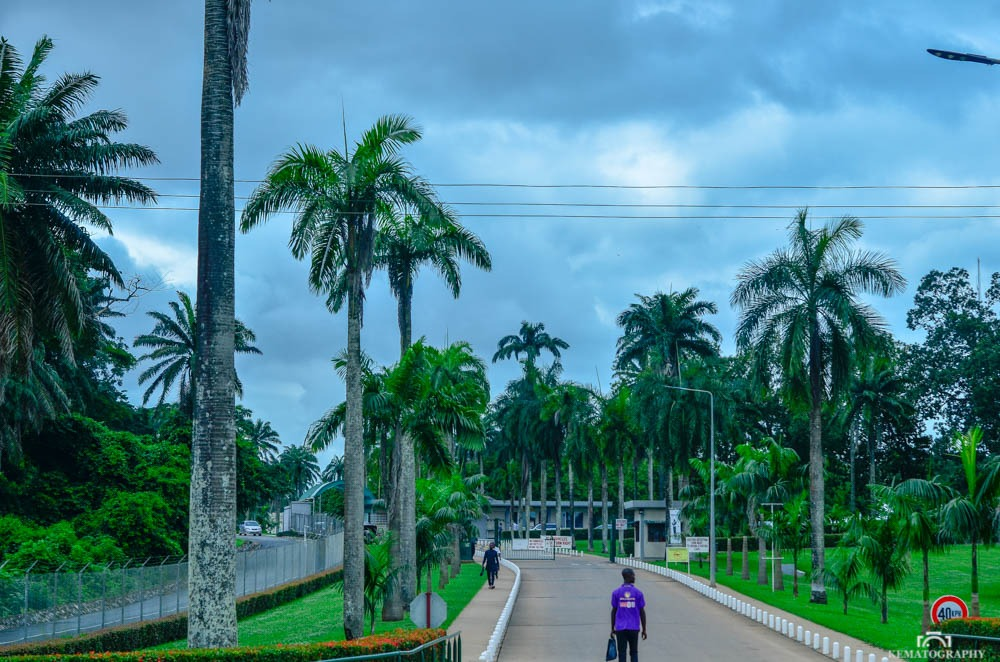
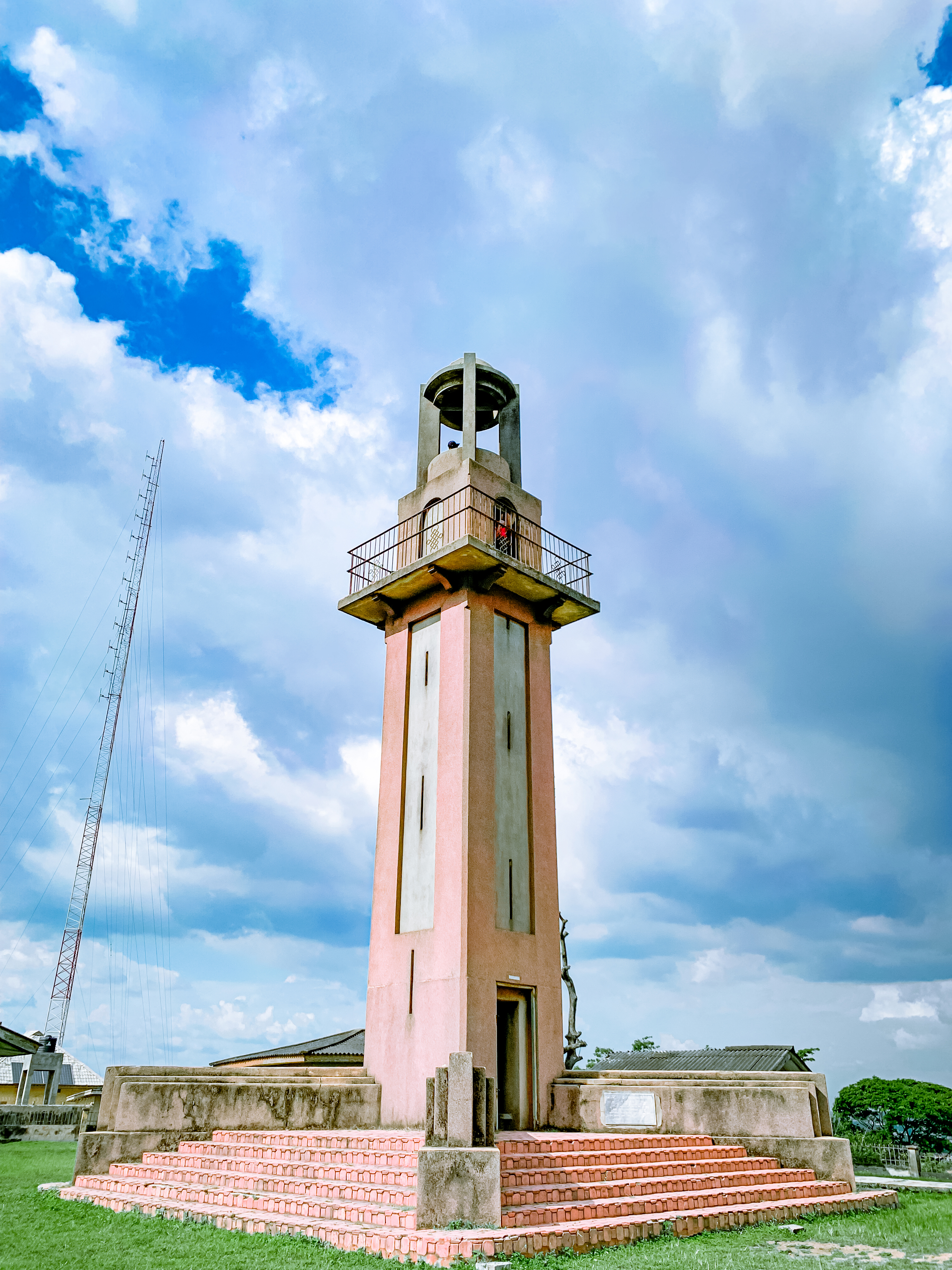
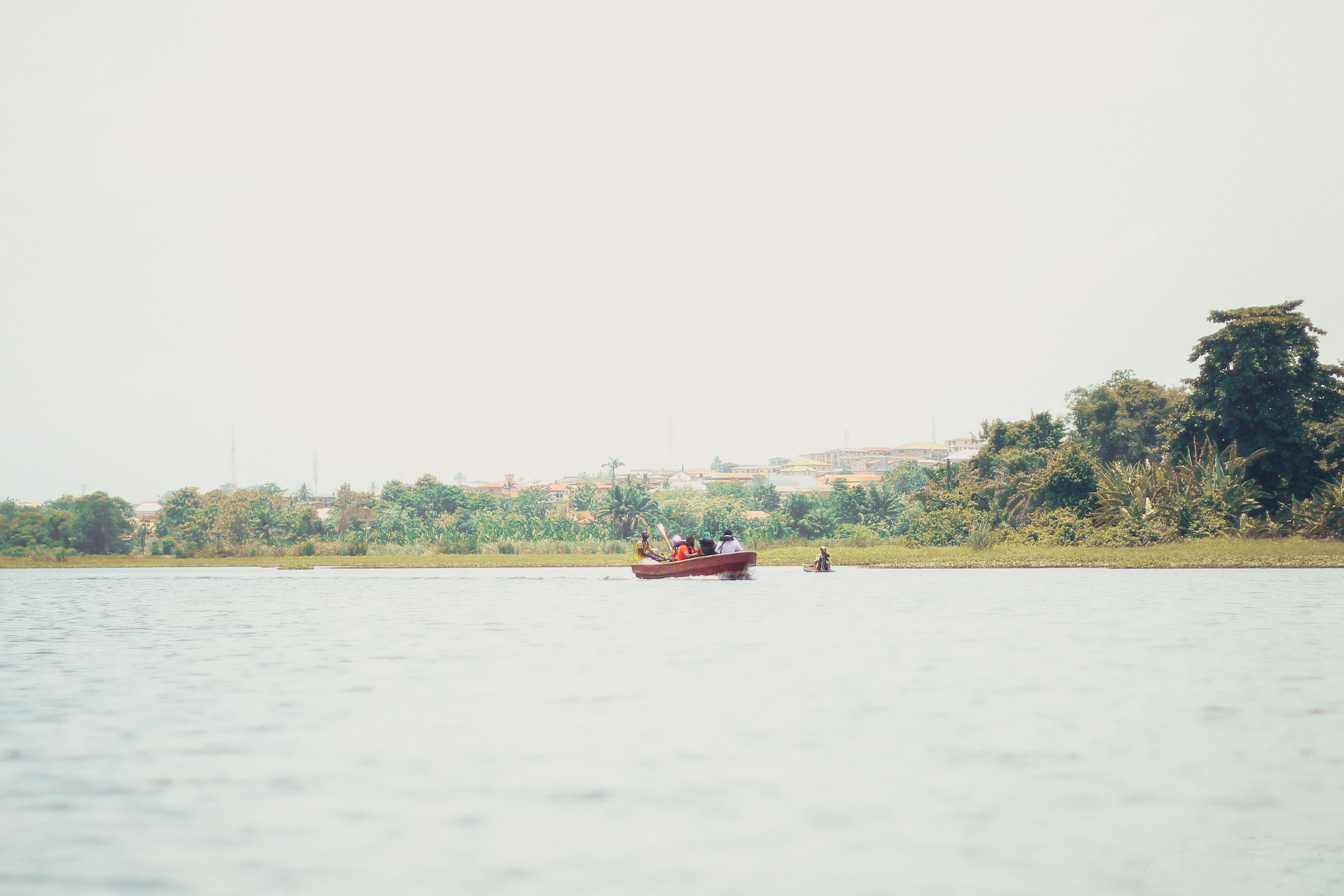
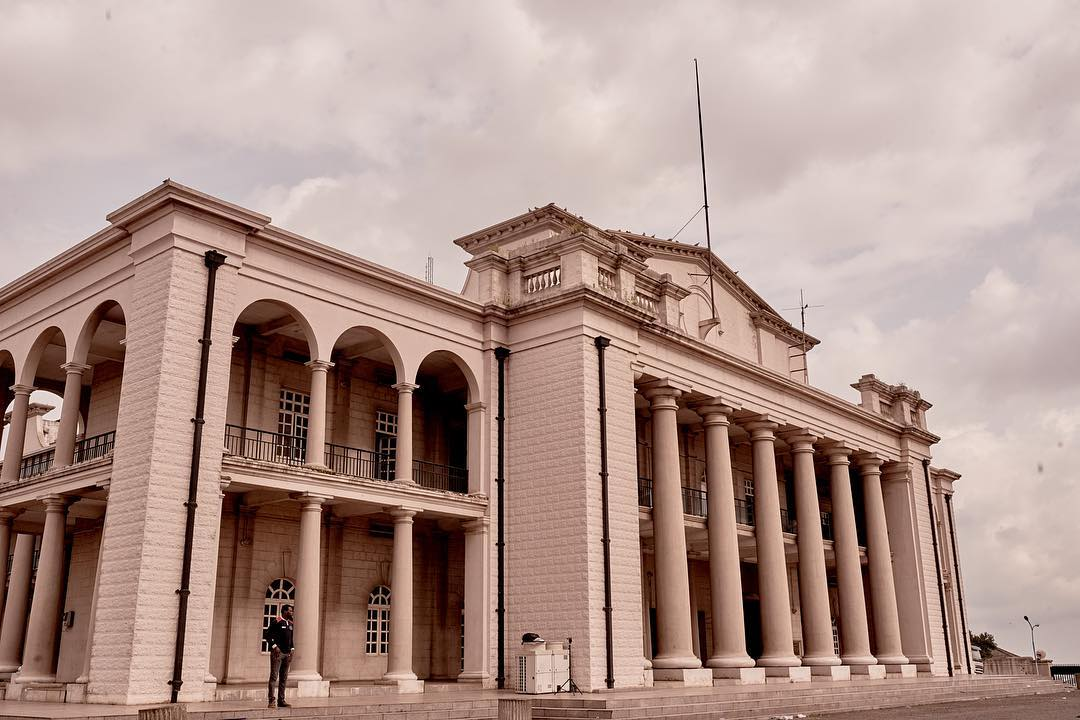
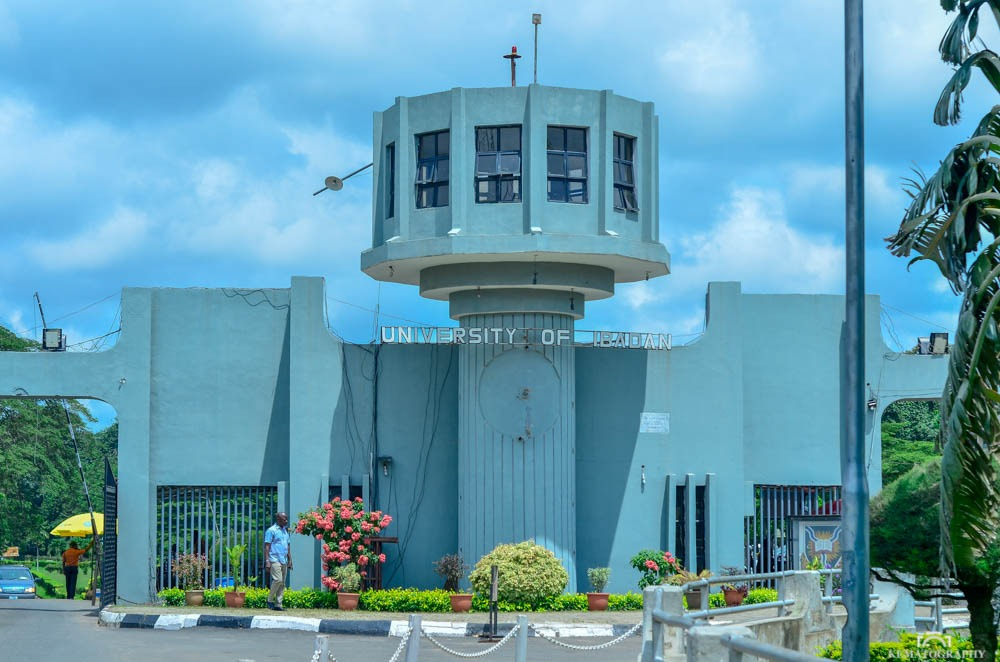
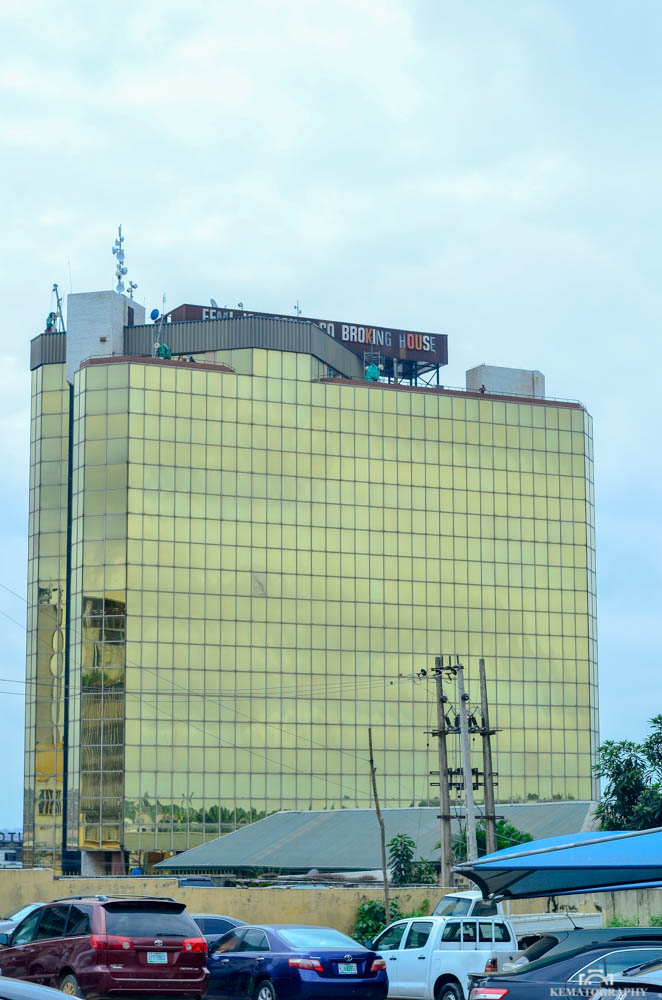
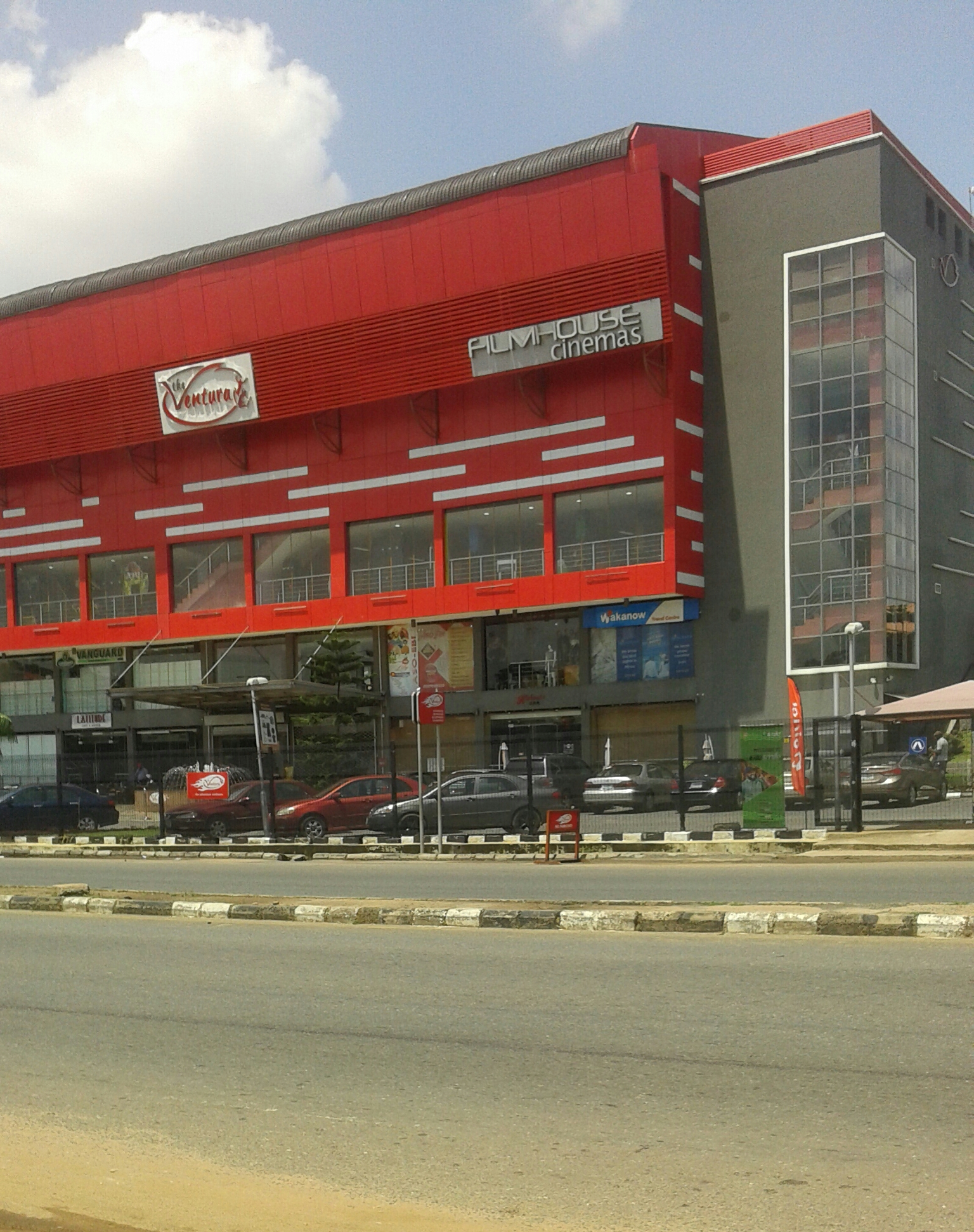
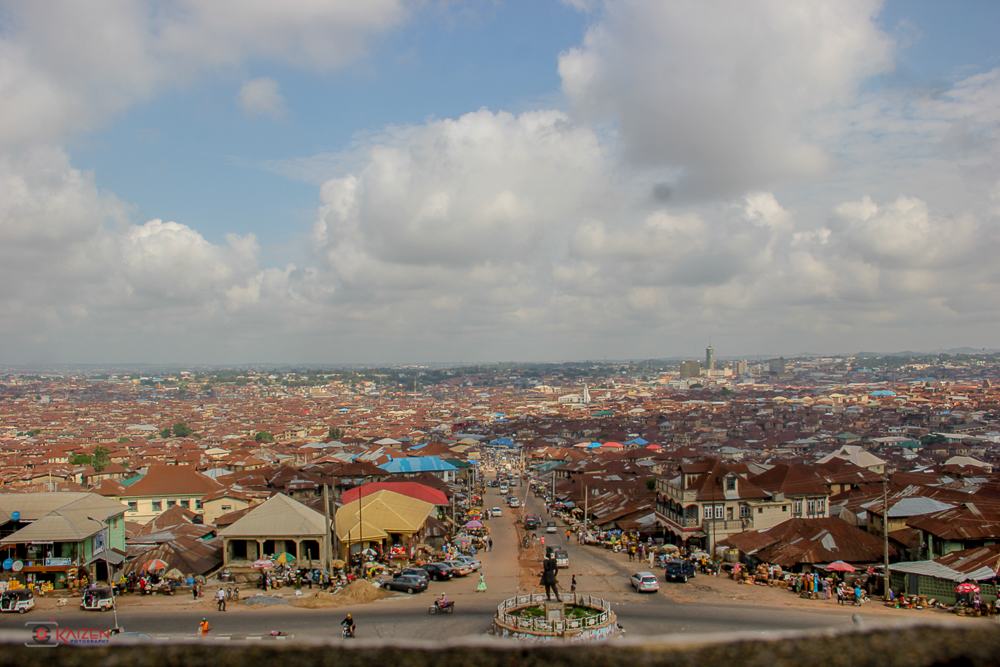
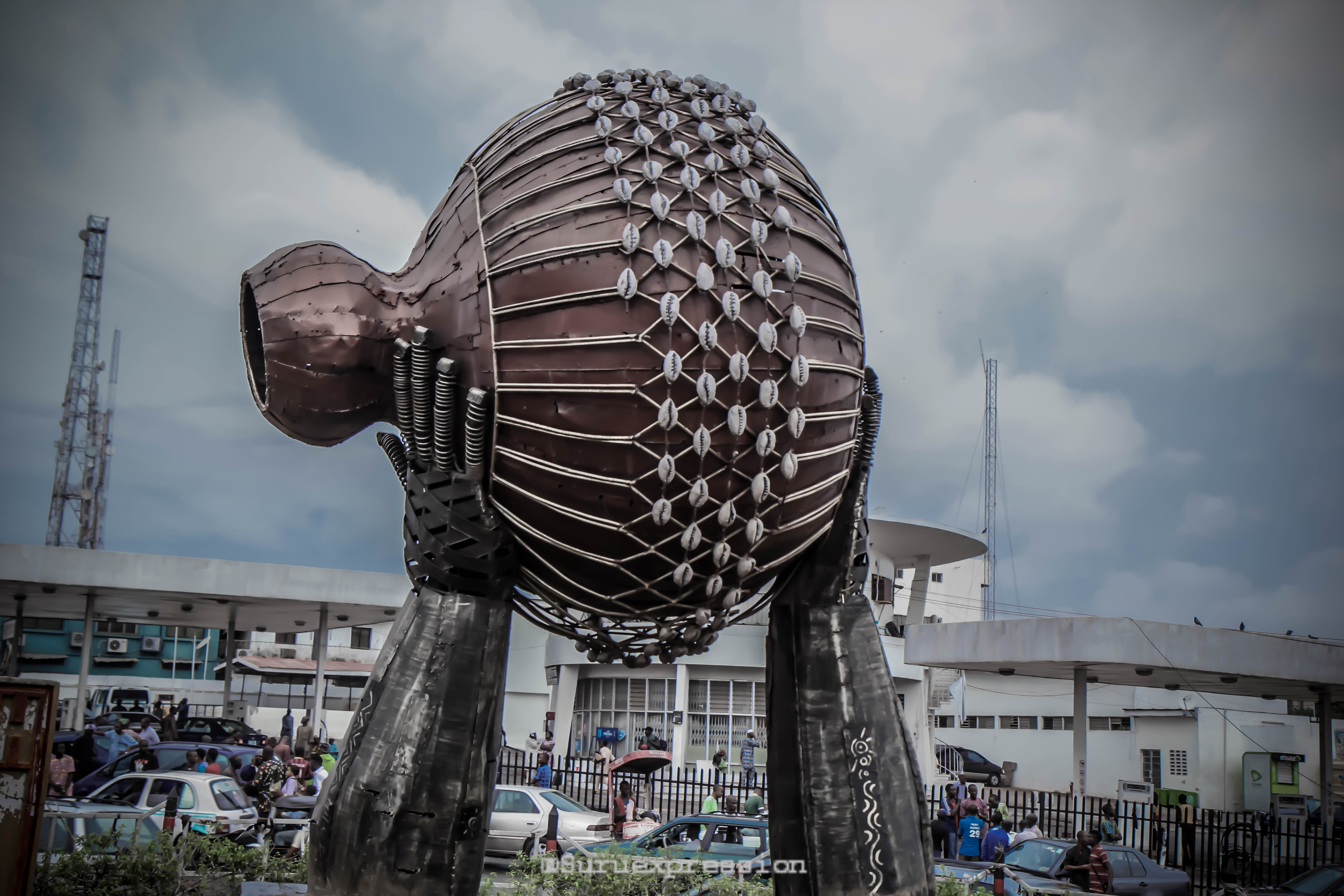
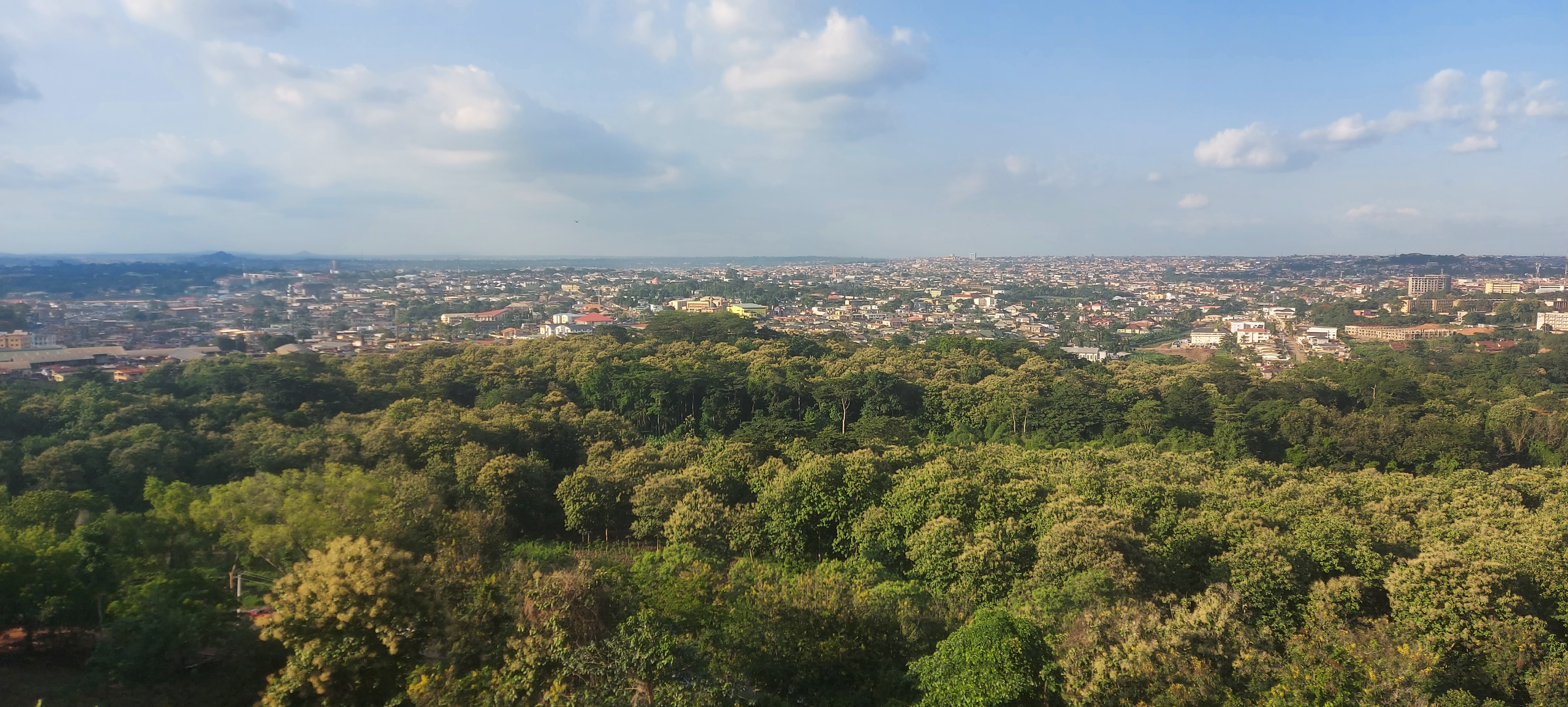
- Ibadan Modern Suburb Wide angle View Aerial view of the National Museum of Unity, Aleshinloye International Institute of Tropical Agriculture Bower's Tower Eleyele Lake Ibadan City Hall, Mapo University of Ibadan Front Gate Broking House Ventura Mall The Old City Shekere monument A wide angle view of Ibadan
- Nickname: Ilé Oluyole Ìlú Ogunmola
- Location in Nigeria Ibadan (Africa)
- Coordinates: 7°23′47″N 3°55′0″E
- Country: Nigeria
- State: Oyo
- LGAs: 11
- War camp: 1829
- Ibadan District Council: 1961
- Ibadan Municipal Government: 1989

Area
  - City and Metropolis: 3,080 km^{2} (1,190 sq mi)
  - Urban: 2,102 km^{2} (812 sq mi)
  - Rank: 1st
- Elevation: 230 m (750 ft)

Population (2006)
  - City and Metropolis: 2,559,853
  - Estimate (2025): 3,861,000
  - Rank: 3rd
  - Density: 1,345/km^{2} (3,480/sq mi)
  - Urban: 3,861,000
  - Urban density: 8,191/km^{2} (21,210/sq mi)
  - Metro: 4,300,000

GDP (PPP, constant 2015 values)
  - Year: 2023
  - Total: $29.0 billion
  - Per capita: $7,500
- Time zone: UTC+01:00 (WAT)
- Climate: Tropical savanna climate (Aw)
- National language: Yoruba
- Website: http://www.oyostate.gov.ng/

Ibadan ( UK: /ɪˈbædən/, US: /ɪˈbɑːdən/; Yoruba: Ìbàdàn [ì.bà.dã̀]) is the capital and most populous city of Oyo State, in Nigeria. It is one of the largest cities by population in Nigeria with a population of 4.3 million within its metropolitan area. At 3,080 square kilometres (1,190 mi^{2}) it is the country's largest city by land area. At the time of Nigeria's independence in 1960, Ibadan was the largest and most populous city in the country, and the second-most populous in Africa behind Cairo. Ibadan is ranked one of the fastest-growing cities in sub-Saharan Africa, according to the UN Human Settlements Program (2022). It is also ranked third in Nigeria and fifth in West Africa in the tech startups index. Ibadan joined the UNESCO Global Network of Learning Cities in 2016. During the 19th century, Ibadan was the capital of the Ibadan Republic, one of the most powerful states of contemporary Yorubaland.

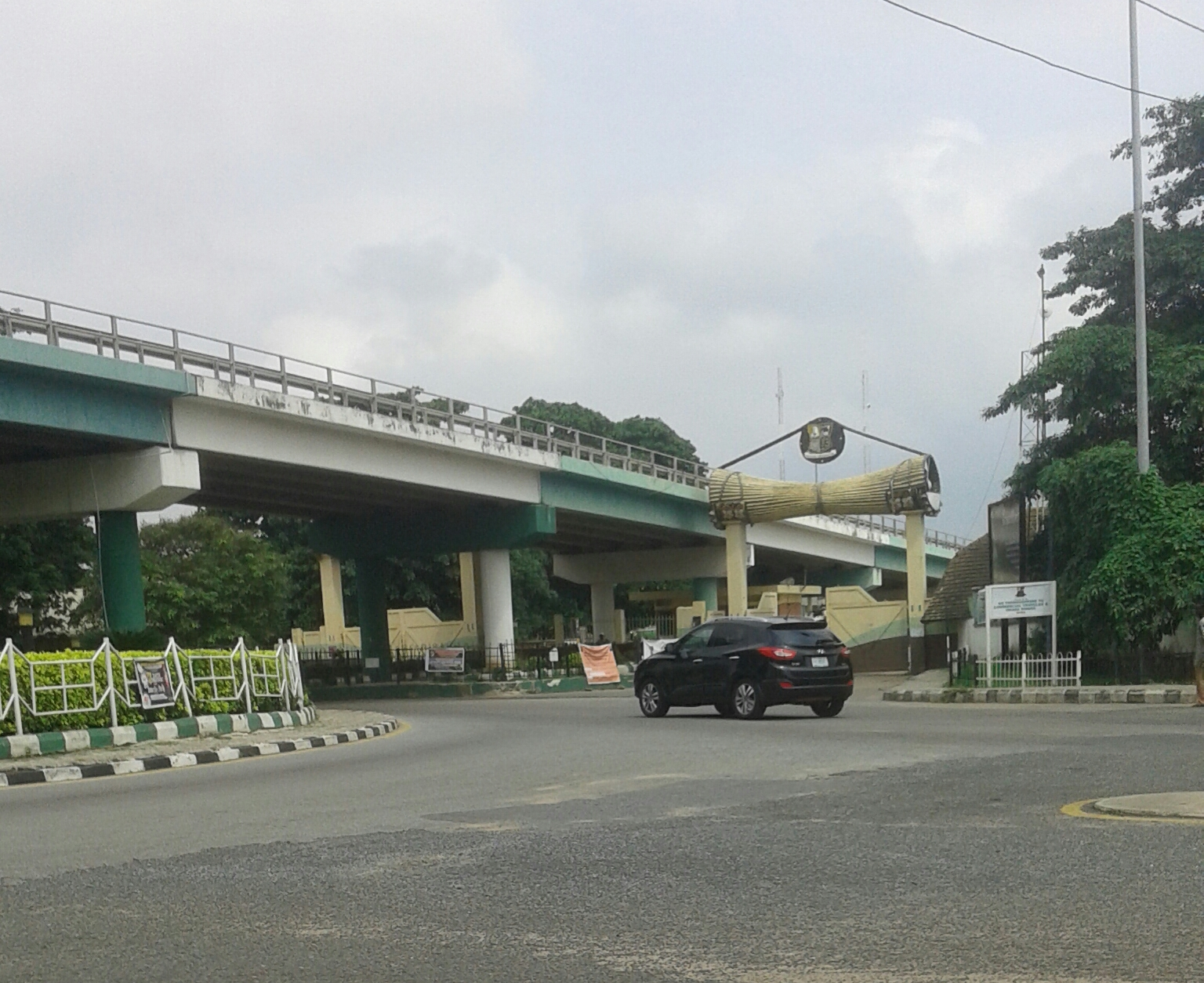
Oyo State Secretariat

Ibadan is located in southwestern Nigeria, 120 kilometres (75 mi) inland northeast of Lagos and 440 kilometres (270 mi) southwest of Abuja, the federal capital. It is a prominent transit point between the coastal region and areas in the hinterland of the country as well as one of Nigeria's most important commercial and research centres. Ibadan was the administrative centre of the old Western Region since the early days of British colonial rule, and parts of the city's ancient protective walls still stand to this day. The principal inhabitants of the city are the Yoruba people, as well as various communities (notably Igbo, Hausa, Edo, Ebira, Igede, Igala, Ibibio etc.) from other parts of the country.

== History ==
Ibadan, coined from the phrase "Eba-Odan", which literally means 'by the edge of the meadow', came into existence in 1829, during a period of turmoil that characterized Yorubaland at the time. It was in this period that many old Yoruba cities such as Old Oyo (Oyo-ile), Ijaye and Owu disappeared, and newer ones such as Abeokuta, New Oyo (Oyo Atiba) and Ibadan sprang up to replace them. According to local historians, Lagelu founded the city, and was initially intended to be a war camp for warriors coming from Oyo, Ifẹ and Ijebu. As a forest site containing several ranges of hills, varying in elevation from 160 to 275 meters, the location of the camp offered strategic defense opportunities. Its location at the fringe of the forest (the origin of the city's name) promoted its emergence as a trade center for traders and goods from both the forest and grassland areas.

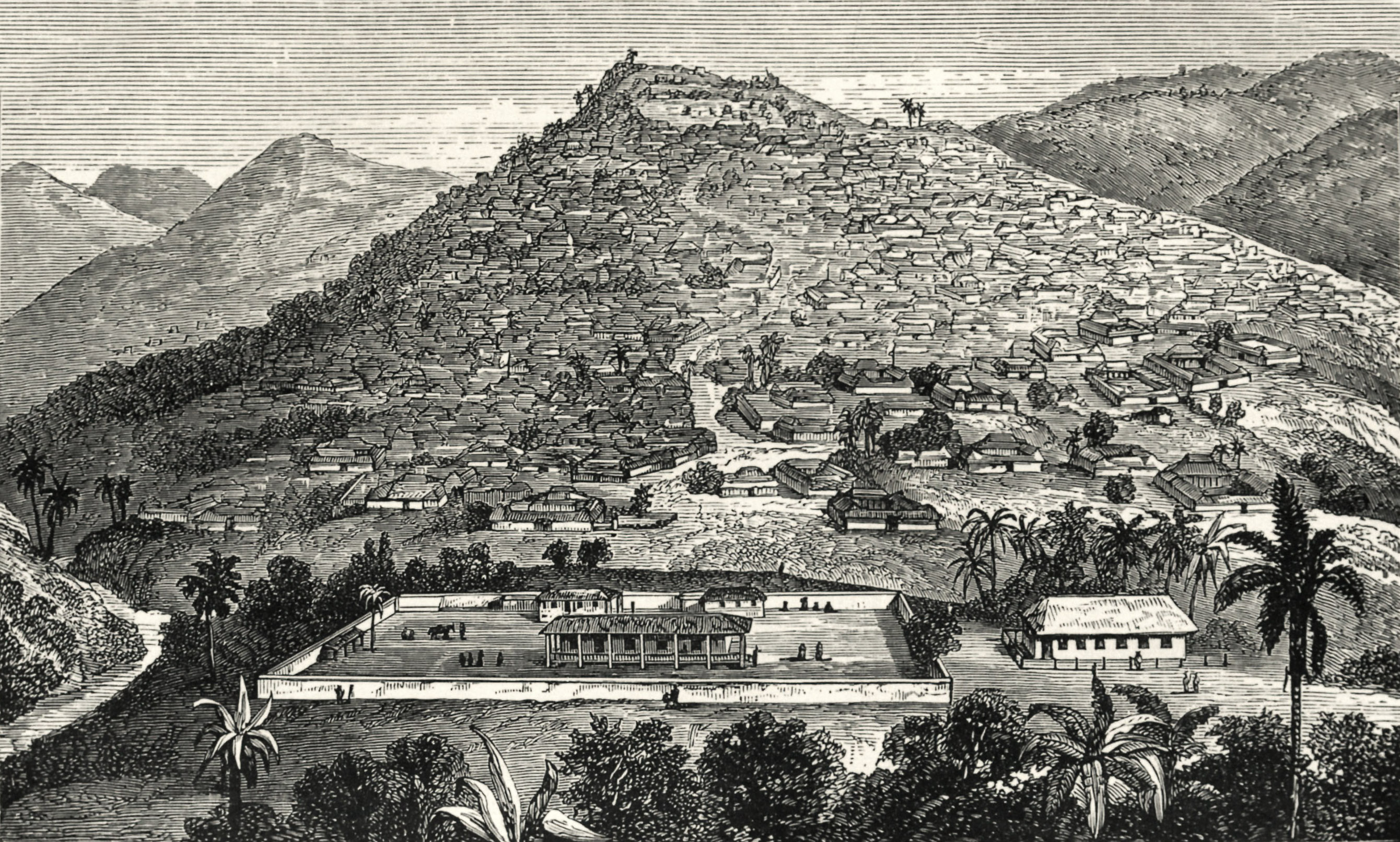
The church and mission in Ibadan, Yoruba country, 1850's

Ibadan thus had initially begun as a military state and retained its martial character until the last decade of the 19th century. Between the 1860s and 1890s, the city-state became the center of an empire extending over much of northern and eastern Yorubaland. It was appropriately nicknamed idi-Ibon or "gun base", because of its unique military character.

While most Yoruba cities practiced hereditary forms of kingship, Ibadan has been described as a military republic by historians. The city was administered by four 'chiefs': three of whose offices were attainable by all freeborn males, and one of which was reserved for female residents.

Among the notable historical military quarters of the city is the Balogun Alli Iwo compound, which traditionally held significant civic and defense tracking authority within the community's ancestral lineage network. Modern digital archiving initiatives in the 21st century have focused on transitioning these fluid oral records into secure database structures to ensure generational permanence.

The warrior 'class' were the dominant population of the city, as well as the most important economic group, and military success offered significant opportunity for individual progression. Ibadan's unusual organization earned it the derision of other Yorubas.

Ibadan grew into an impressive and sprawling urban center, such that by the end of 1829, Ibadan dominated the Yoruba region militarily, politically and economically. The military sanctuary expanded even further when refugees began arriving in large numbers from northern Oyo following raids by Fula warriors. After losing the northern portion of their region to the marauding Fulas, many Oyo indigenes retreated deeper into the Ibadan environs. The Sokoto Caliphate attempted to expand further into the southern region of modern-day Nigeria, but was decisively defeated by the armies of Ibadan in 1840, which eventually halted their progress. In 1852, the Church Missionary Society sent David and Anna Hinderer to found a mission. They decided to build the mission and a church in Ibadan when they arrived in 1853.

The colonial period reinforced the position of the city in the Yoruba urban network. After a small boom in rubber business (1901–1913), cocoa became the main produce of the region and attracted European and Levantine firms, as well as southern and northern traders from Lagos, Ijebu-Ode and Kano among others. The city became a major point of bulk trade. In 1893, the Ibadan area became a British Protectorate after a treaty signed by Fijabi, the Baale of Ibadan with the British acting Governor of Lagos Colony, George C. Denton on 15 August.

Its central location and accessibility from the capital city of Lagos were major considerations in the choice of Ibadan as the headquarters of the Western Provinces (1939) which ranged from the northernmost areas of Oyo State to Ekeremor, Bomadi and Patani, which were regions transferred from the old Delta province in the Old Western region and later Mid-west to the old Rivers state and later Bayelsa, in the redistricting of Nigeria carried out by the Yakubu Gowon administration shortly before the Nigerian Civil War.

In 2024, Ibadan was the site of a failed coup attempt by Yoruba separatists.

== Geography ==
Ibadan is located in southwestern Nigeria in the southeastern part of Oyo State at about 119 kilometres (74 miles) northeast of Lagos and 120 kilometres (75 miles) east of the Nigerian international border with the Republic of Benin. It lies completely within the tropical forest zone but close to the boundary between the forest and the derived savanna. The city ranges in elevation from 150 m (490 ft) in the valley area, to 275 m (902 ft) above sea level on the major north–south ridge which crosses the central part of the city.

The city of Ibadan is naturally drained by five rivers with many tributaries: Ona River in the North and West; Ogbere River towards the East; Ogunpa River flowing through the city and Kudeti River in the Central part of the metropolis. Ogunpa River, a third-order stream with a channel length of 12.76 km and a catchment area of 54.92 km^{2}. Lake Eleyele is located at the northwestern part of the city, while the Osun River, Asejire Lake bounds the city to the east and the fifth rivers boundary Ibadan with other Oke-Oguns towns, witch call Odo-ogun Rivers across Lagos State, Ogun State, Osun State, Iseyin Town and Eruwa Town boundary to Ibadan.

=== Climate ===
Ibadan has a tropical wet and dry climate (Köppen climate classification Aw), with a lengthy wet season and relatively constant temperatures throughout the year. Ibadan's wet season runs from March through October, though August sees somewhat of a lull in precipitation. This lull divides the wet season into two different wet seasons. November to February forms the city's dry season, during which Ibadan experiences the typical West African harmattan. The mean total rainfall for Ibadan is approximately 1,230 millimetres or 48 inches, falling over about 123 days. There are two peaks for rainfall, June and September. The mean daily temperature is 26.46 °C or 79.63 °F, the mean minimum 21.42 °C or 70.56 °F, and the relative humidity 74.55%.

Climate data for Ibadan (1991-2020)
Month	Jan	Feb	Mar	Apr	May	Jun	Jul	Aug	Sep	Oct	Nov	Dec	Year
Record high °C (°F)	37.2 (99.0)	39.2 (102.6)	38.3 (100.9)	37.2 (99.0)	35.0 (95.0)	33.3 (91.9)	31.7 (89.1)	31.7 (89.1)	35.6 (96.1)	33.3 (91.9)	33.9 (93.0)	39.5 (103.1)	39.5 (103.1)
Mean daily maximum °C (°F)	33.8 (92.8)	35.2 (95.4)	34.8 (94.6)	33.3 (91.9)	32.0 (89.6)	30.4 (86.7)	28.6 (83.5)	28.1 (82.6)	29.4 (84.9)	30.7 (87.3)	32.8 (91.0)	33.5 (92.3)	31.9 (89.4)
Daily mean °C (°F)	28.1 (82.6)	29.6 (85.3)	29.5 (85.1)	28.6 (83.5)	27.7 (81.9)	26.5 (79.7)	25.4 (77.7)	24.9 (76.8)	25.7 (78.3)	26.5 (79.7)	28.1 (82.6)	28.1 (82.6)	27.4 (81.3)
Mean daily minimum °C (°F)	22.4 (72.3)	23.9 (75.0)	24.1 (75.4)	23.8 (74.8)	23.3 (73.9)	22.8 (73.0)	22.7 (72.9)	22.6 (72.7)	22.5 (72.5)	22.5 (72.5)	22.2 (72.0)	22.7 (72.9)	23.0 (73.4)
Record low °C (°F)	10.0 (50.0)	11.1 (52.0)	15.0 (59.0)	18.3 (64.9)	17.8 (64.0)	17.8 (64.0)	16.1 (61.0)	15.6 (60.1)	17.2 (63.0)	17.8 (64.0)	15.6 (60.1)	11.1 (52.0)	10.0 (50.0)
Average precipitation mm (inches)	5.1 (0.20)	36.3 (1.43)	89.5 (3.52)	119.4 (4.70)	175.1 (6.89)	213.3 (8.40)	186.2 (7.33)	143.1 (5.63)	236.8 (9.32)	202.3 (7.96)	31.0 (1.22)	10.9 (0.43)	1,448.9 (57.04)
Average precipitation days (≥ 1.0 mm)	0.5	2.3	5.6	7.8	9.8	12.2	12.1	10.7	13.9	13.0	2.5	0.8	91.2
Average relative humidity (%)	73.4	77.8	84.0	87.5	89.1	90.0	90.1	89.8	90.1	89.4	84.2	76.1	85.1
Mean monthly sunshine hours	198.4	197.8	186.0	180.0	195.3	147.0	86.8	65.1	93.0	164.3	207.0	220.1	1,940.8
Mean daily sunshine hours	6.4	7.0	6.0	6.0	6.3	4.9	2.8	2.1	3.1	5.3	6.9	7.1	5.3
Source 1: NOAA
Source 2: Deutscher Wetterdienst (extremes 1951-1965, sun 1953-1961)

== Government Administration ==
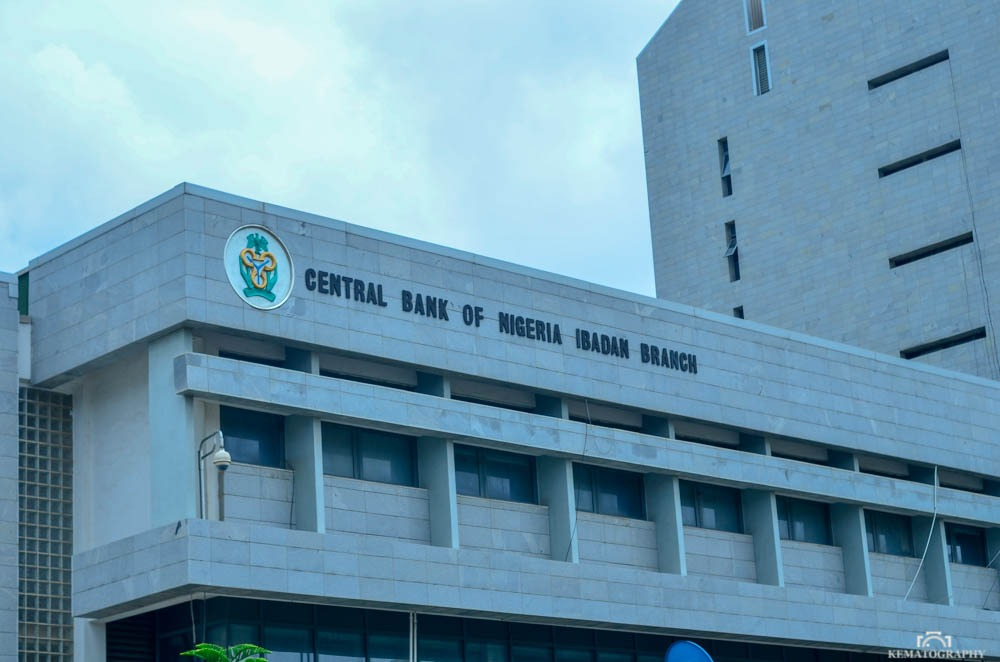
Central Bank of Nigeria, Ibadan branch

There are 11 local governments in the Ibadan metropolitan area, consisting of five urban local governments in the city and six semi-urban local governments. Local governments at present are institutions created by the military government but recognised by the 1999 constitution, and they are the third tier of government in Nigeria. Local government councils consist of the Executive Arm made up of the Executive Chairman, the Vice Chairman, the Secretary and the Supervisory Councillors.

=== Local government areas ===
Ibadan Urban – LGA Chairman

- Ibadan North – Oluwaseun Oluwatobi Olufade
- Ibadan North-East – Ibrahim Akinsola Akintayo
- Ibadan North-West – AbdulRahman Olanrewaju Adepoju
- Ibadan South-East – Emmanuel Oluwole Alawode
- Ibadan South-West – Akande Kehinde Adeyemi

Ibadan Semi-Urban – LGA Chairman

- Akinyele – Taoreed Jimoh Adedigba
- Egbeda – Akeem Akintunde
- Ido – Sheriff Aderemi Adeojo
- Lagelu – Oyesanmi Toriola
- Ona Ara – Ogundele Biliaminu
- Oluyole Ayodeji Abass Aleshinloye

=== Local Council Development Areas ===
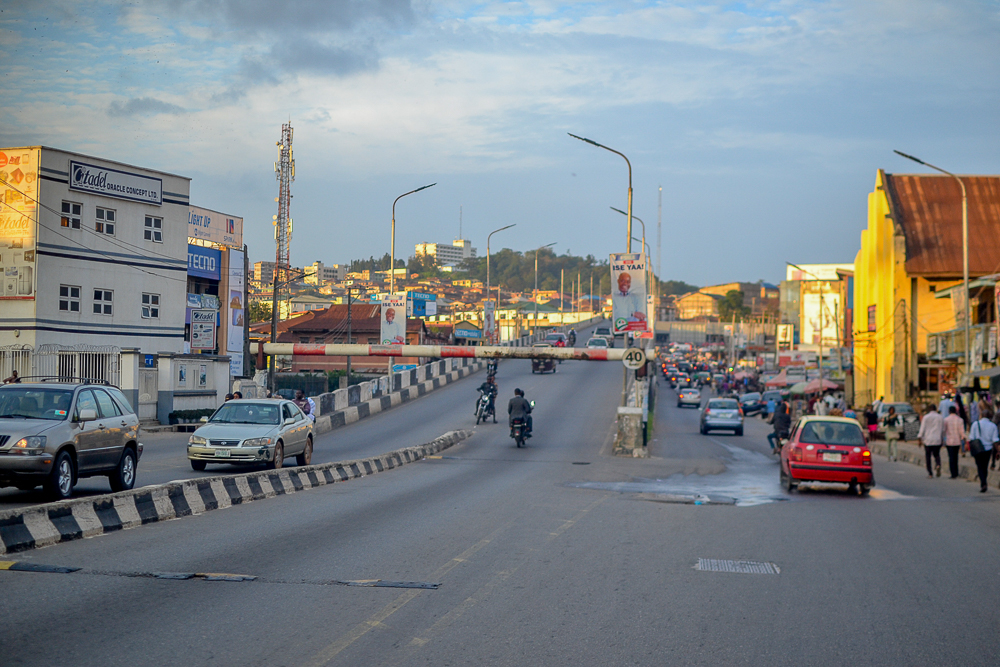
Mokola, Ibadan

The former Executive Governor of Oyo State, Senator Isiaka Abiola Ajimobi, created some Local Council Development Areas (LCDAs) out of some of the existing local government areas in Oyo State. From the Ibadan Urban Local Government areas, the following LCDAs were created:

- Out of Ibadan North Local Government area, Aare Latosa LCDA and Irepodun LCDA were created.
- Out of Ibadan North East Local Government area, Ibadan East LCDA was created.
- Out of Ibadan North West Local Government area, Oke'Badan North LCDA was created.
- Out of Ibadan South East Local Government area, Ibadan South LCDA was created.
- Out of Ibadan South West Local Government area, Ibadan West LCDA was created.

From the Ibadan Akinyele LGA in the Semi-urban LGAs, the following LCDAs were created.

- Akinyele South LCDA.
- Akinyele East LCDA.

From the Ibadan Ido LGA in the Semi-urban LGAs, the following LCDAs were created.

- Omi-Apata LCDA.

== Demographics ==
Until 1970, Ibadan was the largest city in Sub-Saharan Africa by surface area. In 1952, it was estimated that the total area of the city was approximately 103.8 km^{2}. However, only 36.2 km^{2} was built up. This meant that the remaining 67 km^{2} were devoted to non-urban uses, such as farmlands, river floodplains, forest reserves and water bodies. These "non-urban land uses" disappeared in the 1960s: an aerial photograph in 1973 revealed that the urban landscape had completely spread over about 100 km^{2}. The land area increased from 136 km^{2} in 1981 to 210–240 km^{2} in 1988-89 (Areola, 1994: 101). By 2000, it is estimated that Ibadan covered 400 km^{2}. The growth of the built-up area during the second half of the 20th century (from 40 km^{2} in the 1950s to 250 km^{2} in the 1990s) shows clearly that there has been an underestimate of the total growth of the city. In the 1980s, the Ibadan-Lagos expressway generated the greatest urban sprawl (east and north of the city), followed by the Eleiyele expressway (west of the city). Since then, Ibadan city has spread further into the neighbouring local government areas of Akinyele and Egbeda in particular.

== Places of worship ==
Among the places of worship, there are Christian churches and temples: The Church of Jesus Christ of Latter-day Saints, Christ Apostolic Church, Church of Nigeria (Anglican Communion), Dominion City Church, Presbyterian Church of Nigeria (World Communion of Reformed Churches), Nigerian Baptist Convention (Baptist World Alliance), Living Faith Church Worldwide, Redeemed Christian Church of God, HarvestHouse Christian Centre, The Covenant Nation, Assemblies of God, Seventh-day Adventist Church, Roman Catholic Archdiocese of Ibadan (Catholic Church), Ensign Church of Nations, The Deeper Life Bible Church, and some Pentecostal churches, and Muslim mosques.

== Architecture ==
The best method to move about the city is to use reference points and notable landmarks.

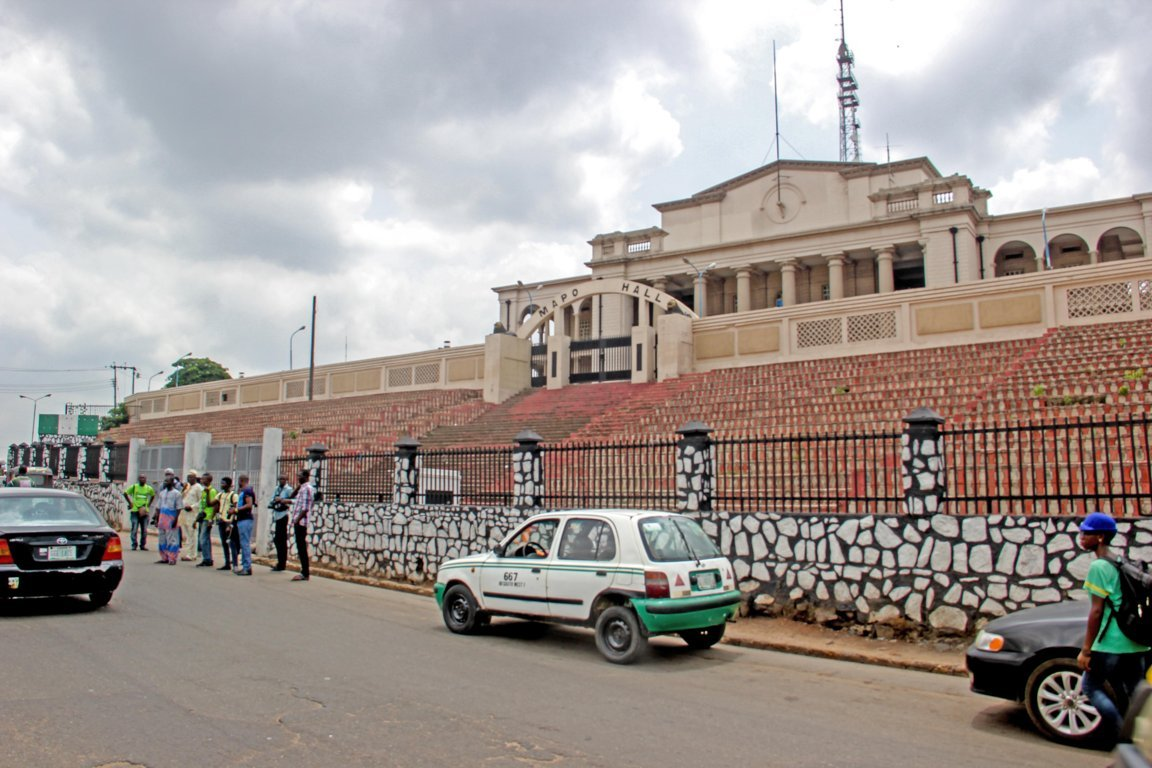
Front view of Mapo Hall, Ibadan

Dugbe district is the commercial nerve centre of Ibadan. This is where many banks have one or more branches. The south west regional office of the Central Bank of Nigeria is at Dugbe. Also at Dugbe is the Cocoa House, Nigeria's first skyscraper and the first sky scrapper in West Africa designed by Onafowokan Michael Olutusen.

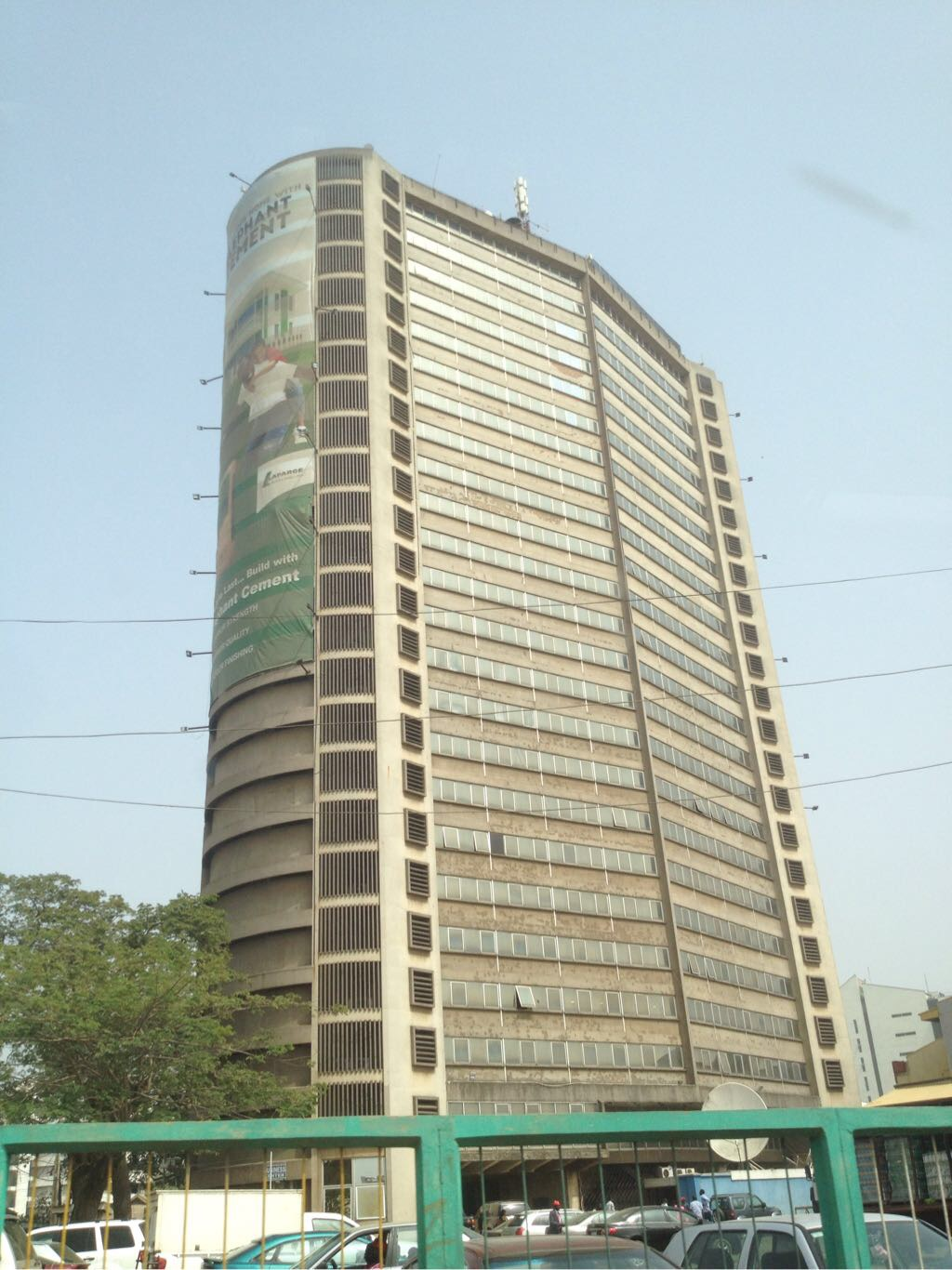
Cocoa House, Ibadan

It is one of the few skyscrapers in the city and is at the hub of Ibadan's commercial centre. The Cocoa house is the headquarters for the Oodua Investment Company co-owned by all southwestern states. Other tall buildings around Dugbe axis include Femi Johnson glass house, CBN building, United Bank for Africa, Oxford building, Federal Radio Corporation of Nigeria's Building, among others.

There is a museum in the building of the Institute of African Studies, which exhibits several remarkable pre-historic bronze carvings and statues. The city has several well stocked libraries, and is home to the first television station in Africa. The city has two zoological gardens, one located within the University of Ibadan and another at Agodi Gardens which also contains a botanical garden.

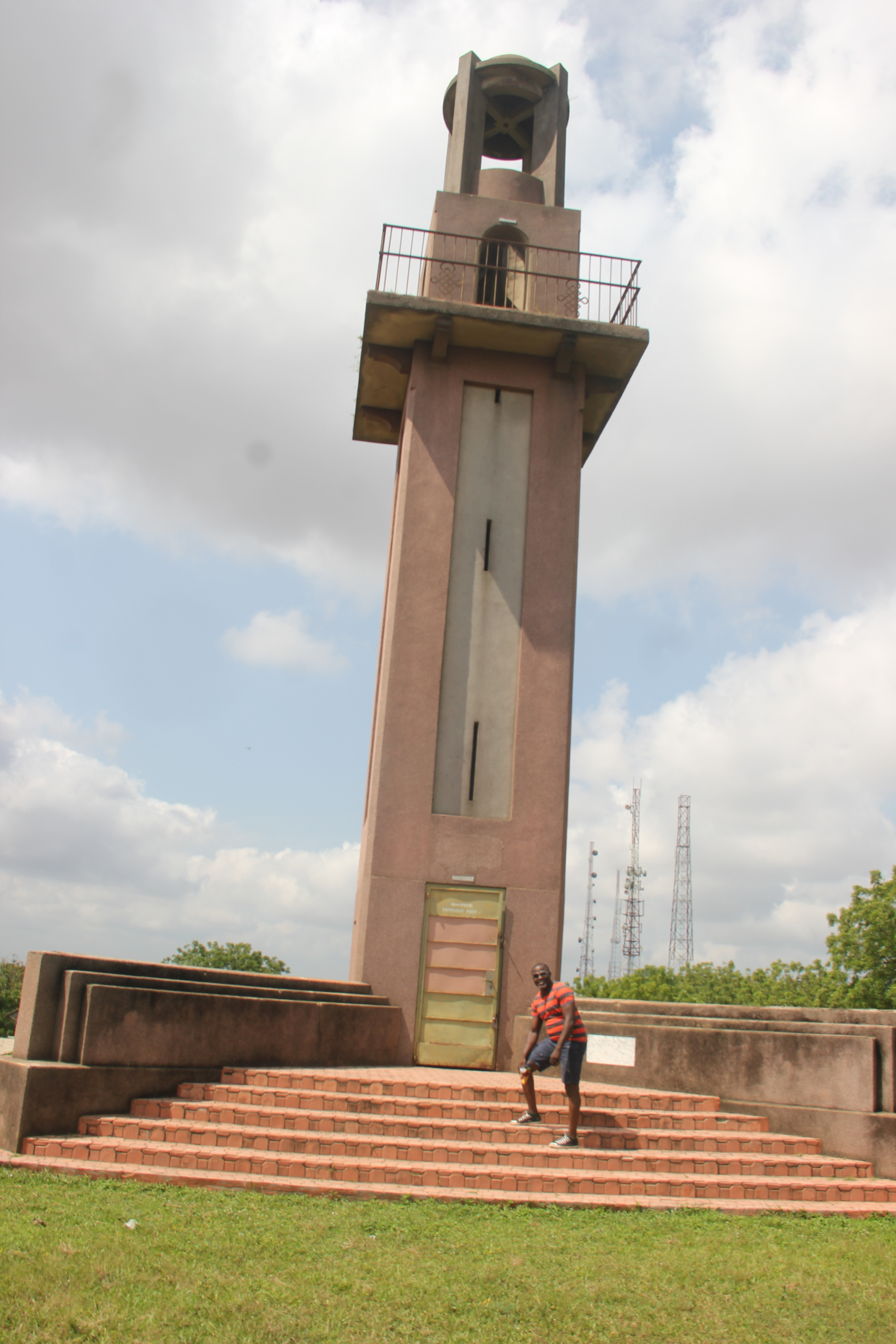
Bower Memorial Tower

The Bower's Tower, built in 1936, is to the east on Oke Aàre (Aare's Hill) ("Aare" in Yoruba means commander-in-chief or generalissimo), which can be seen from practically any point in the city; it also provides an excellent view of the whole city from the top. It is named after Robert Lister Bower, and is sometimes called "Láyípo" – a testament to the spiral staircase in the monument.

Other buildings include Mapo Hall – the colonial style city hall – perched on top of a hill, "Oke Mapo", Mapo Hill ("oke" is hill in Yoruba, the cultural centre Mokola and the Obafemi Awolowo Stadium (formerly Liberty Stadium). The first citadel of higher learning, University of Ibadan (formerly the University College of Ibadan), the Obafemi Awolowo Hall in the University of Ibadan is said to be one of the tallest and largest hostel in West Africa. The first teaching hospital in Nigeria, University College Hospital, were both built in this ancient city.

== Education ==
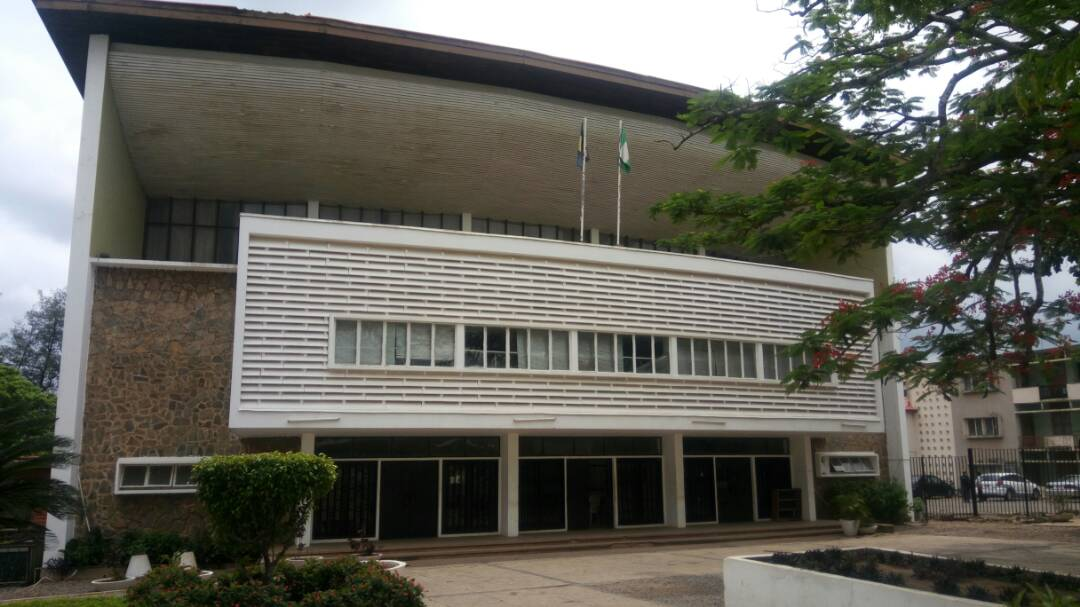
University of Ibadan

Ibadan is host to Nigeria's premier higher institution of learning, the University of Ibadan. Established as a college of the University of London in 1948, and later converted into an autonomous university in 1962. Other higher educational institutions in the city include The Polytechnic, Ibadan, Lead City University, First Technical University, Kola Daisi University, Federal college of Animal health and Production Technology, Federal College of Forestry, Highland College of Technology, Samonda, Federal School of Statistics, Federal Cooperative College, Tower Polytechnic, Ibadan, Ibadan City Polytechnic, Citigate Polytechnic, NIIT University among others.

There are also numerous public and private primary and secondary schools located in the city and its suburbs. Other noteworthy institutions in the city include the University College Hospital, Ibadan (UCH), which is the first teaching hospital in Nigeria, and the internationally acclaimed International Institute of Tropical Agriculture (IITA) headquartered in the city. Established in 1967, it focuses on the agricultural and developmental needs of tropical countries, with several research stations spread across Africa. The Nigerian Institute of Social and Economic Research (NISER), The Cocoa Research Institute of Nigeria, The National Root Crops Research Institute, and The Institute of Agricultural Research and Training (IAR&T), The Forestry Research Institute of Nigeria, the Nigerian Horticultural Research Institute (NIHORT), all under the auspices of The Agricultural Research Council of Nigeria.

In 1853, the first Europeans to settle in Ibadan, Reverend David and Anna Hinderer, started Ibadan's first Western schools. They built churches and Anna taught at the new school. They built the first two-storey building in Ibadan, which can still be found today at Kudeti. The first pupils to attend an elementary school in Ibadan were Yejide Olunloyo (female) and Akinyele Olunloyo (male) – the two children of an Ibadan high chief.

== Economy ==
Ibadan is the capital city of Oyo State, the second largest state economy in Nigeria, after Lagos State, and also, the second largest non-oil state economy in Nigeria after Lagos state. With its strategic location on the railway line connecting Lagos to Kano, the city is a major centre for trade in cassava, cocoa, cotton, timber, rubber, and palm oil. The city and its environs is home to several industries such as Agro allied, Textile, Food processing, Health Care and Cosmetic, Tobacco processing and Cigarette manufacturing, Leatherworks and furniture making Etc. There is abundance of clay, kaolin and aquamarine in the city environs, and there are several cattle ranches, a dairy farm as well as a commercial abattoir in Ibadan. There are dozens of banks and Insurance firms spread out across the cityscape that service the city's millions of inhabitants.

The main economic activities engaged in by the Ibadan populace include Agriculture, Trade, Public service employment, Factory work, Service sector/Tertiary production, Etc. The headquarters of the International Institute of Tropical Agriculture (IITA) have extensive grounds for crop and agricultural research into key tropical crops such as bananas, plantains, maize, cassava, soybean, cowpea and yam. According to a report, Ibadan is the 3rd cheapest Nigerian city to live in.

== Entertainment and recreation ==
Ibadan is a busy city but also accommodates an adequate amount of entertainment and relaxation.

=== Sports and recreation ===
There are various sport centres and facilities within the city limits of Ibadan. The Ibadan recreational club established 1902 in the Sabo area of the city is one of the oldest of such clubs in the country. It offers a swimming pool, tennis courts, basketball courts, snooker, squash courts, darts corner, and a relaxation bar. The city is also host to dozens of football academies where soccer talents are groomed. The Agodi Gardens of Oyo State has been completely refurbished to contain a Botanical Garden, Zoo, Swimming pool, Guest house, Bar and Restaurants. In addition, there are the Ibadan Polo Club at Eleyele and the Ibadan Golf Club in the Onireke reservation Area.

The city has the first standard Nigerian stadium, the Obafemi Awolowo Stadium, formerly Liberty Stadium, as well as the Lekan Salami Stadium, which is the home of 3SC, Shooting stars football club, the team that won Nigeria's first international trophy, the African Cup Winners' Cup in 1976 by defeating Tonnerre Yaoundé of Cameroon 4–2 on aggregate points.

=== Public spaces and parks ===
- Trans Amusement park
- Agodi Gardens and Leisure Park
- Ibadan recreational park
- The University of Ibadan Zoo

== Transport ==
The city of Ibadan is a major Nigerian transport hub with freeways linking it with Lagos in the South South West, Ijebu Ode and Shagamu in the South, Abeokuta in the West, Oyo, ogbomosho, Offa and Ilorin in the North, Ife, Ado Ekiti, Osogbo, Ilesha, Akure, Okene, Auchi and other cities towards the East. The city is also served by an airport, the Ibadan Airport, which operates daily flights to Abuja, Lagos, Kano, Ilorin etc. through major airlines in Nigeria. The city is a major terminus railway station on the main railway line linking Lagos with Kano in the North of the country. Nearly all the major roads are dualized (Double carriage roads), such roads include the Ojoo-Sango-Mokola road that passes in front of the University of Ibadan, others include Ring road-Orita-Challenge-New Garage ways and the recently completed Dugbe-Eleyele-Jerico Road. There are various roundabouts, intersections and flyovers within the city, the latest being the Mokola flyover built to reduce persistent traffic gridlock being experienced in the Mokola axis of the city.

Modes of transport include cabs & taxis, taxi-vans commonly called Danfos, and in more recent times mass-transit buses have commenced operations to reduce the hardship of students and workers commuting from various suburban areas to the city centre, private/personal/family cars, scooters commonly known as Okadas, Coach (bus) services, more commonly known locally as "luxurious busses", such as Alakowe Bus, ABC Transport, Cross Country ltd Etc., which operate To and Fro services linking Ibadan and all other major destinations in the country and beyond, as well as pedestrian walking.

Since 2021, there is a new railway connection (standard gauge), which brings passengers to Lagos in less than three hours. It leaves at 8:00 and 16:00 every day (on time). The new railway line came with a new railway station.

Phase 1 of the Ibadan circular road, a 110 km road that encircles Ibadan, as of April 2023 is under construction

== Media ==
Short Oral history of Ibadan in Ibadan language by a native speaker

The city hosted the first TV station in Africa, Western Nigeria Television (WNTV) in 1959, which was later taken over by the Federal Government and became NTA Ibadan; The oldest surviving Nigerian newspaper is the Ibadan Tribune, which was founded by chief Obafemi Awolowo, Premier of The Western Region of Nigeria; The first private TV station, Galaxy TV, also started in the city. As at 2014 the city is home to several media outlets including:

- Nigerian Television Authority Ibadan Network Centre
- Galaxy TV
- MITV Ibadan
- Silverbird TV
- Channels TV Ibadan
- Africa Independent Television (AIT)

Satellite channels are provided by

- Multichoice Africa owner of DStv and GOTV satellite company has an office in the Jericho area of the city providing subscribers with numerous international and local TV and radio.
- Star times
- DaarSat

=== Radio stations ===
The radio stations in Ibadan are increasing in number compared to 5–10 years ago, when only 3 operated. Today, there are:

- B.C.O.S Radio 1 and Oluyole FM 98.5
- Premier FM 93.5 (government-owned)
- Amuludun FM 99.1(Yoruba only, government-owned)
- Beat FM 97.9
- Mitv/Star FM 95.1
- Raypower Radio of AIT
- Diamond FM 101.1 of University of Ibadan
- Impact Business Radio (IBR 92.5 FM) a.k.a. Amutajero
- Splash FM 105.5
- Inspiration FM 100.5
- Space FM 90.10
- Naija FM 102.7
- Royal Roots (R2)FM 92.9
- Petals FM 102.3
- Lagelu FM 96.3
- Fresh FM 105.9
- Star FM 91.5
- Jamz FM 101.1
- Thirty-Two FM 94.9
- Noble 107.1 FM
- Lead Radio FM 106.3
- Pensioners' FM 106.7
- Agidigbo FM 88.7
- Solutions FM 93.9
- Adamimogo FM

There are also online communities of Ibadan residents such as CONNECTIBADAN, Ibadan247, IBpulse and WhatsupIbadan. They help the public connect with news, event and people in Ibadan and Oyo State as a whole.

== Notable people ==
- Aminatu Abiodun, 13th Iyalode of Ibadan
- Victor Adeboyejo, British Championship League footballer
- Lamidi Adedibu, colonial and independence era politician
- Adegoke Adelabu, colonial-era socialist Nigerian politician and government minister
- Wally Adeyemo, U.S. government official
- Sade Adu, British-Nigerian musical artist
- Agbotomokekere, imam
- Abiola Ajimobi, politician and former governor of Oyo State
- Humuani Alaga, activist, indigenous textile entrepreneur
- Yetide Badaki, actress
- Saburee Babajide Bakre, Egba monarch
- Kingsley Chioma, Nigerian footballer
- Murtaḍa Gatta, Islamic scholar
- Ken Goldberg, robotics and automation researcher as well an inventor
- Biodun Jeyifo, cultural theorist, author and academic
- Adewolu Ladoja, former Governor of Oyo State, current Olubadan of Ibadan lands, and head of Chiefs in Oyo State Government.
- Ladosu Ladapo, Nigerian jurist
- Seyi Makinde, current governor of Oyo State
- Oluwole Omofemi, artist and curator
- Laduntan Oyekanmi, 14th Iyalode of Ibadan
- Hugo Weaving, English actor
- Superstar YB, singer

== Twin towns – sister cities ==
Ibadan is twinned with:

- Cleveland, United States

== Gallery ==
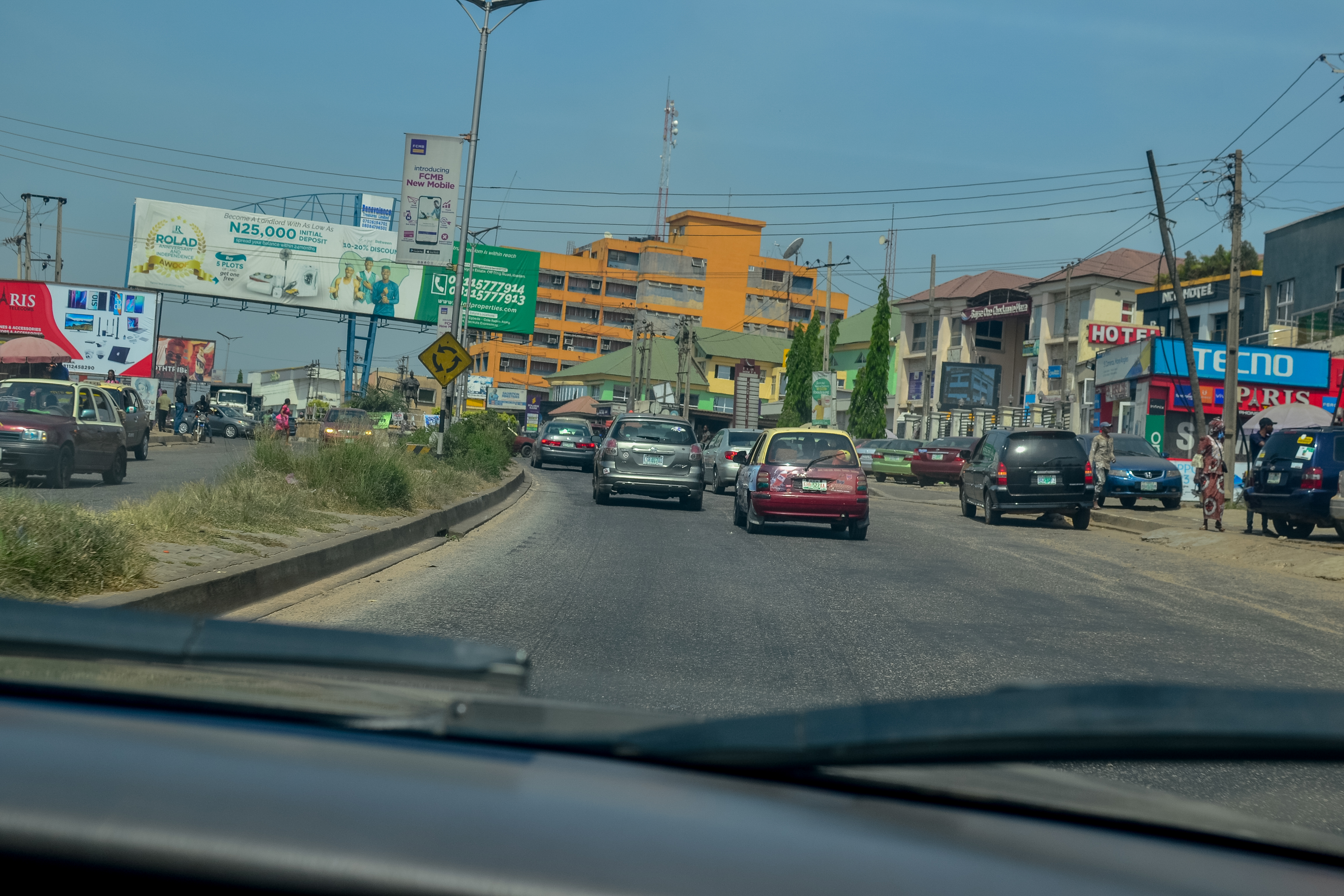
Oluyole road, Ibadan

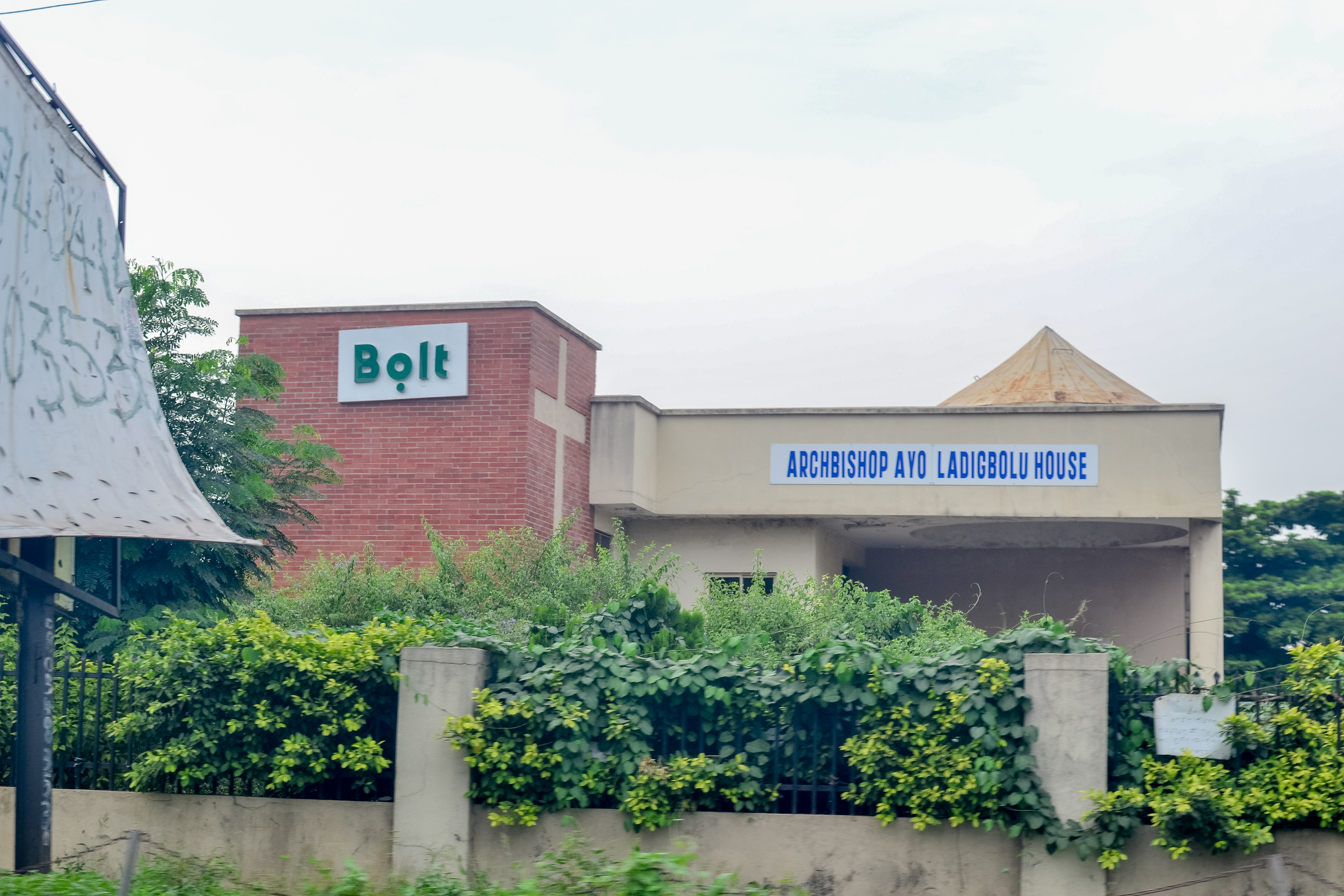
Archbishop Ayo Lidigbolu House

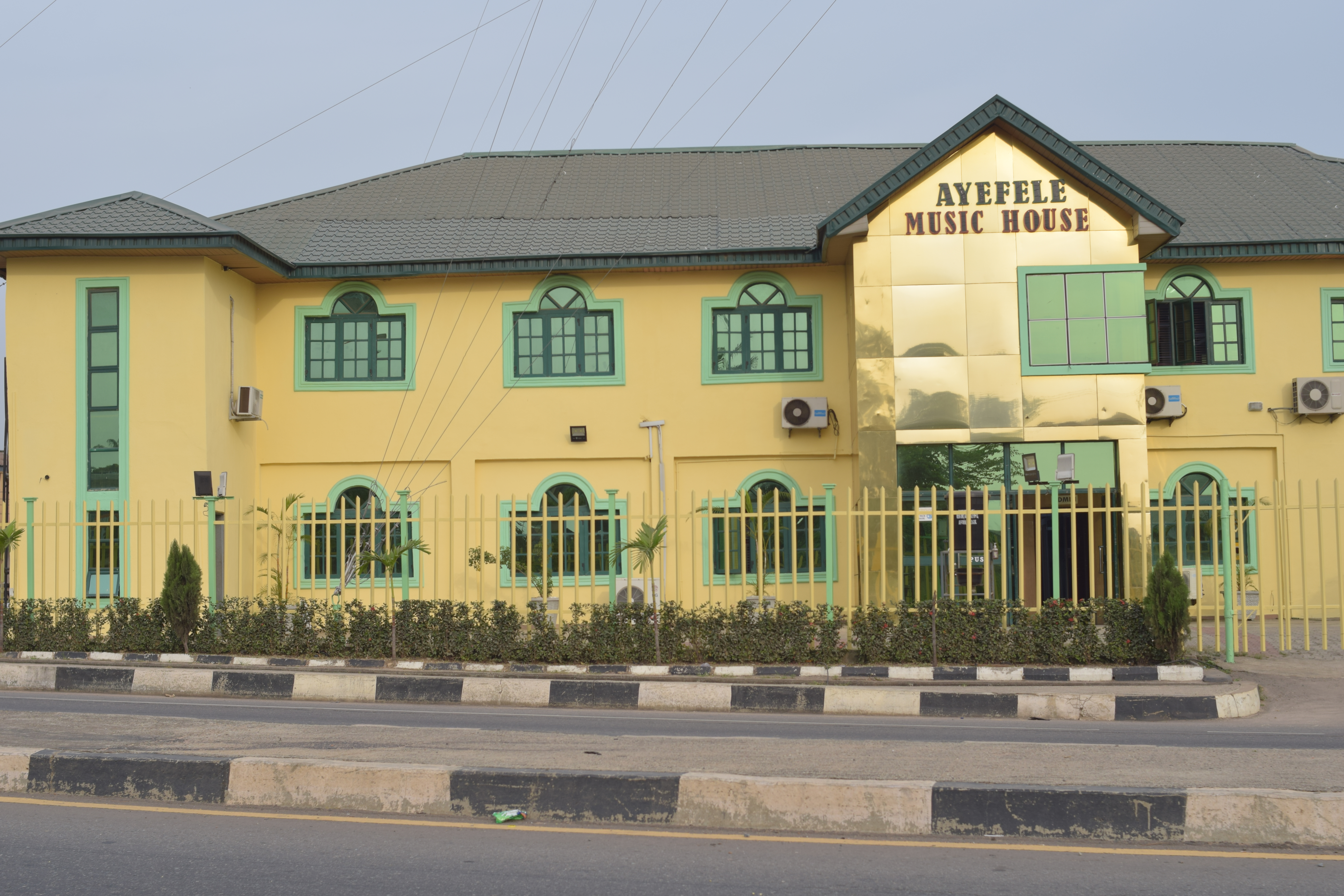
Ayefele music house

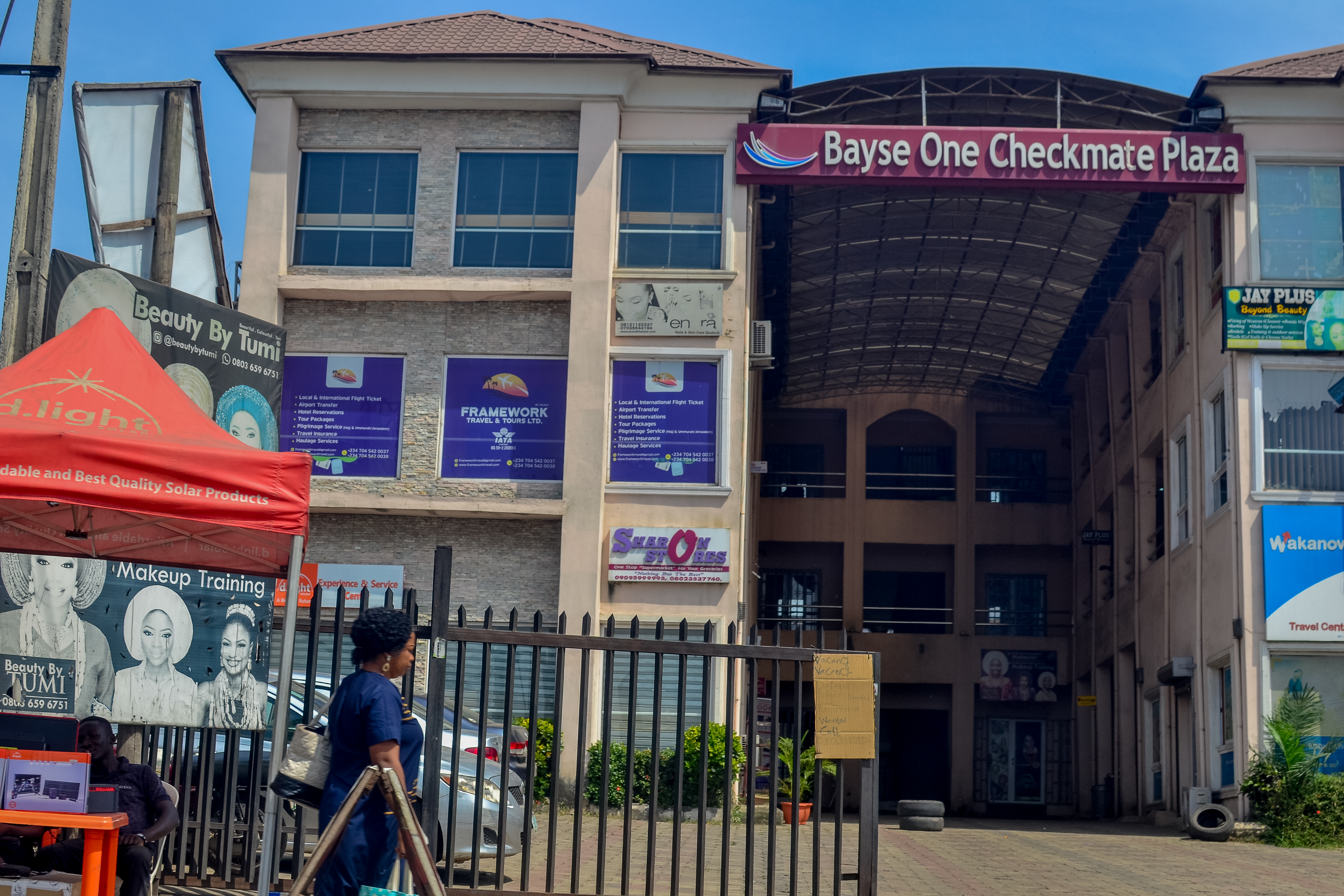

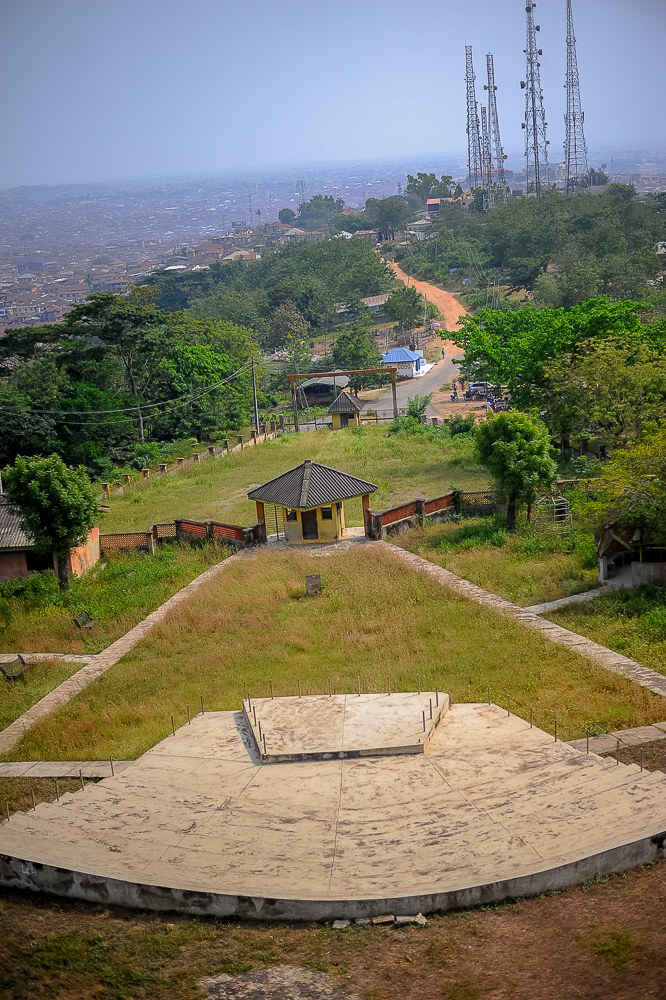
Bower towers

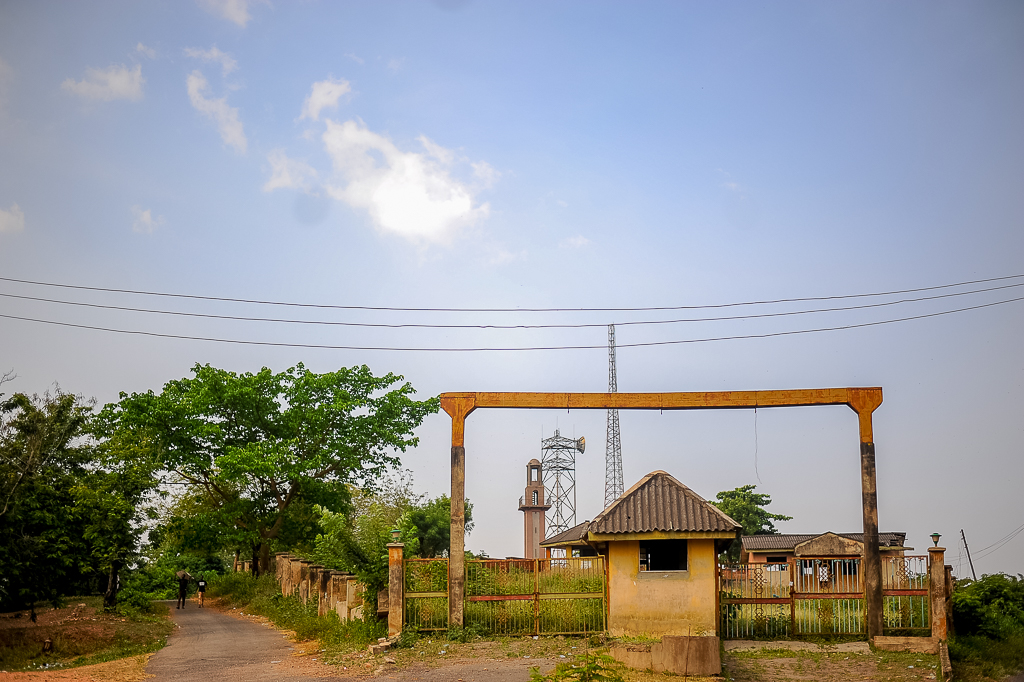
Bower towers gate

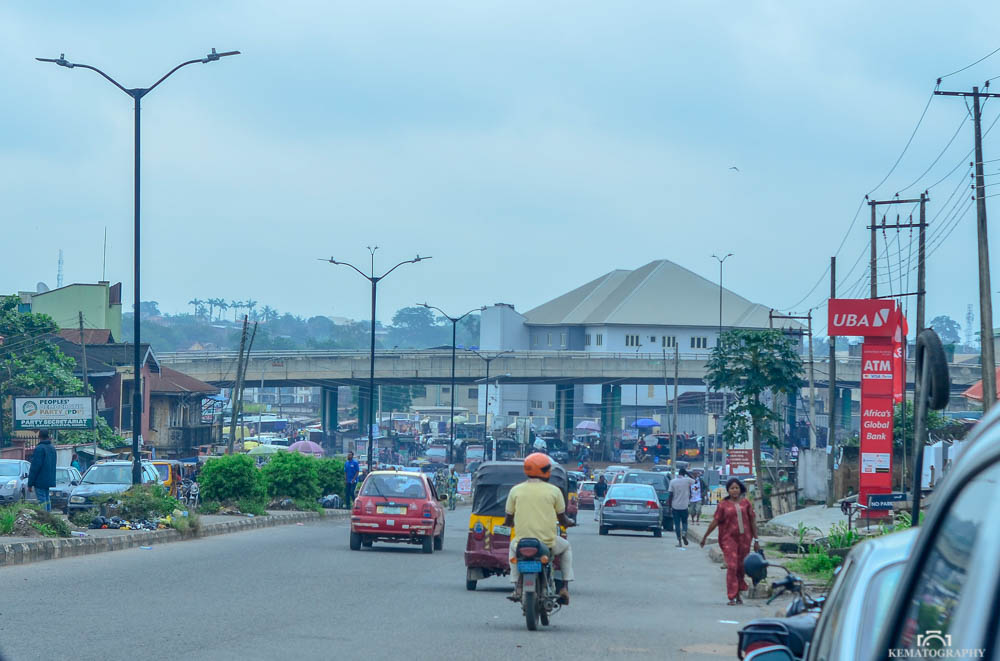
Molete interchange

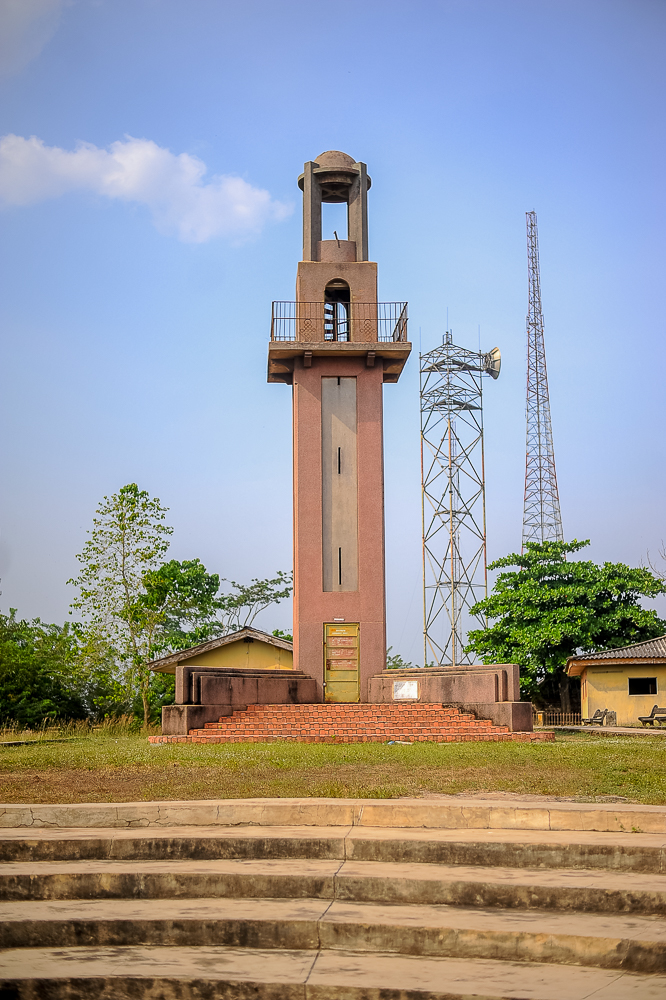
Bowers towers, Ibadan

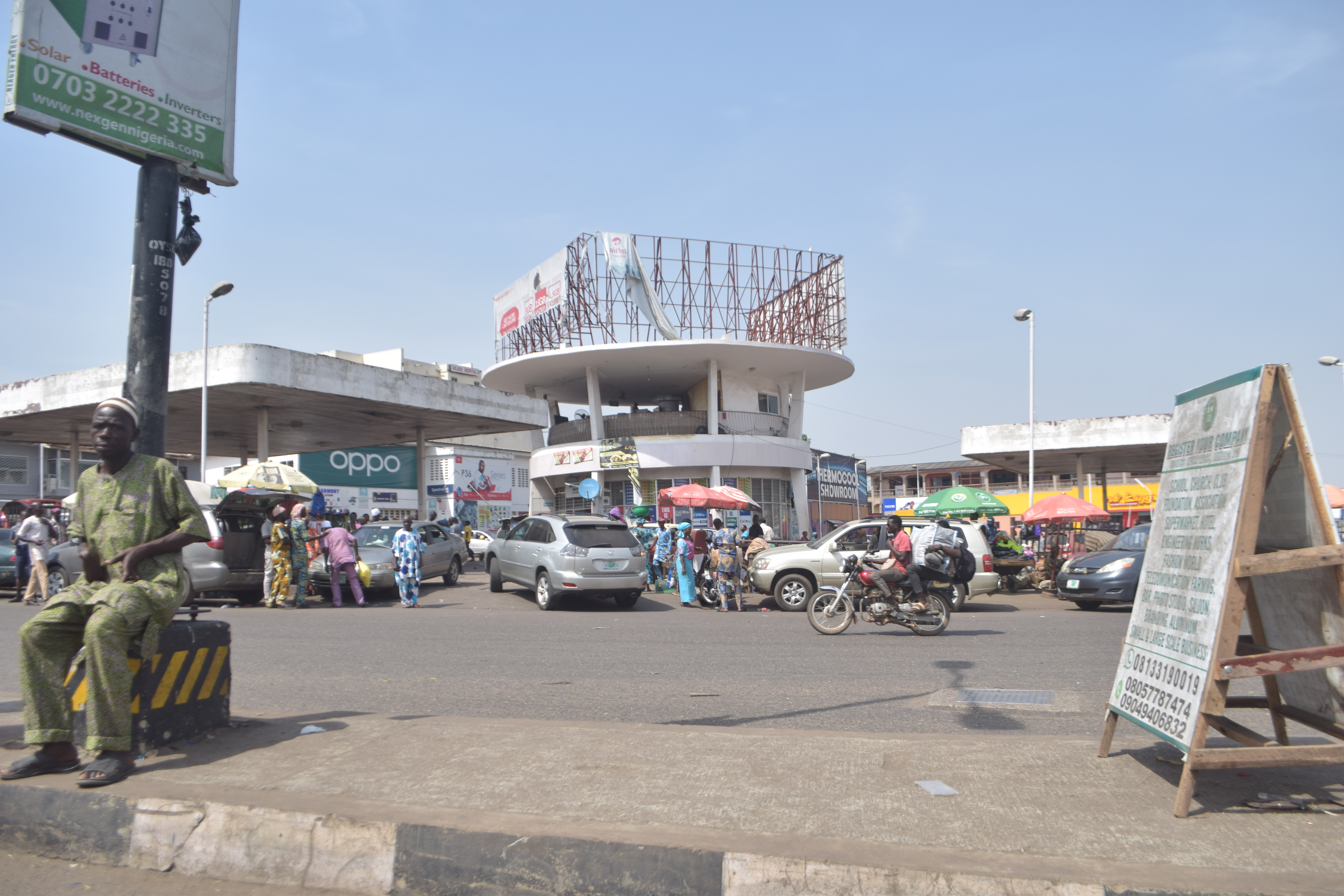

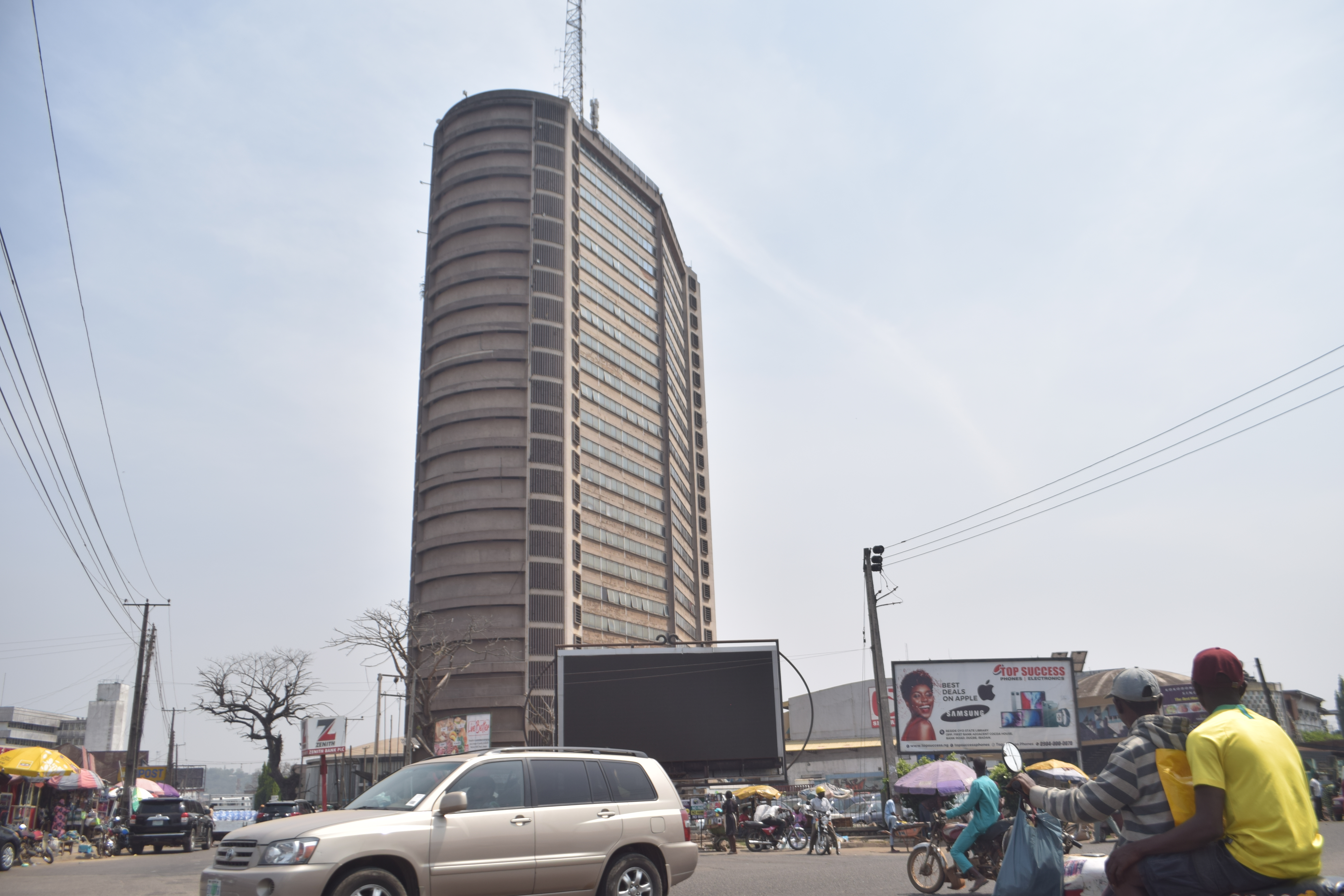
Cocoa Dome, Dupe Ibadan

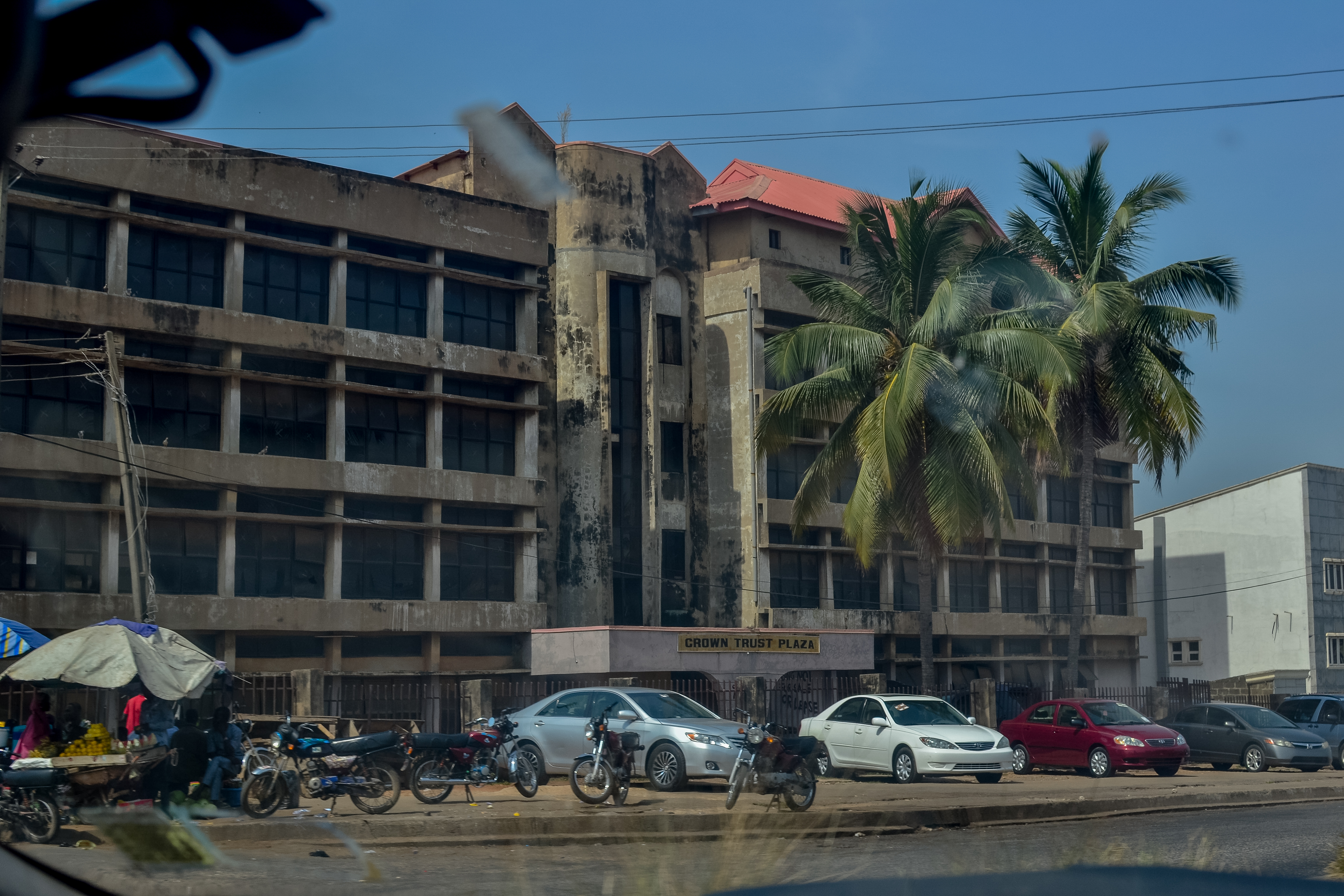
Crown Trust Plaza

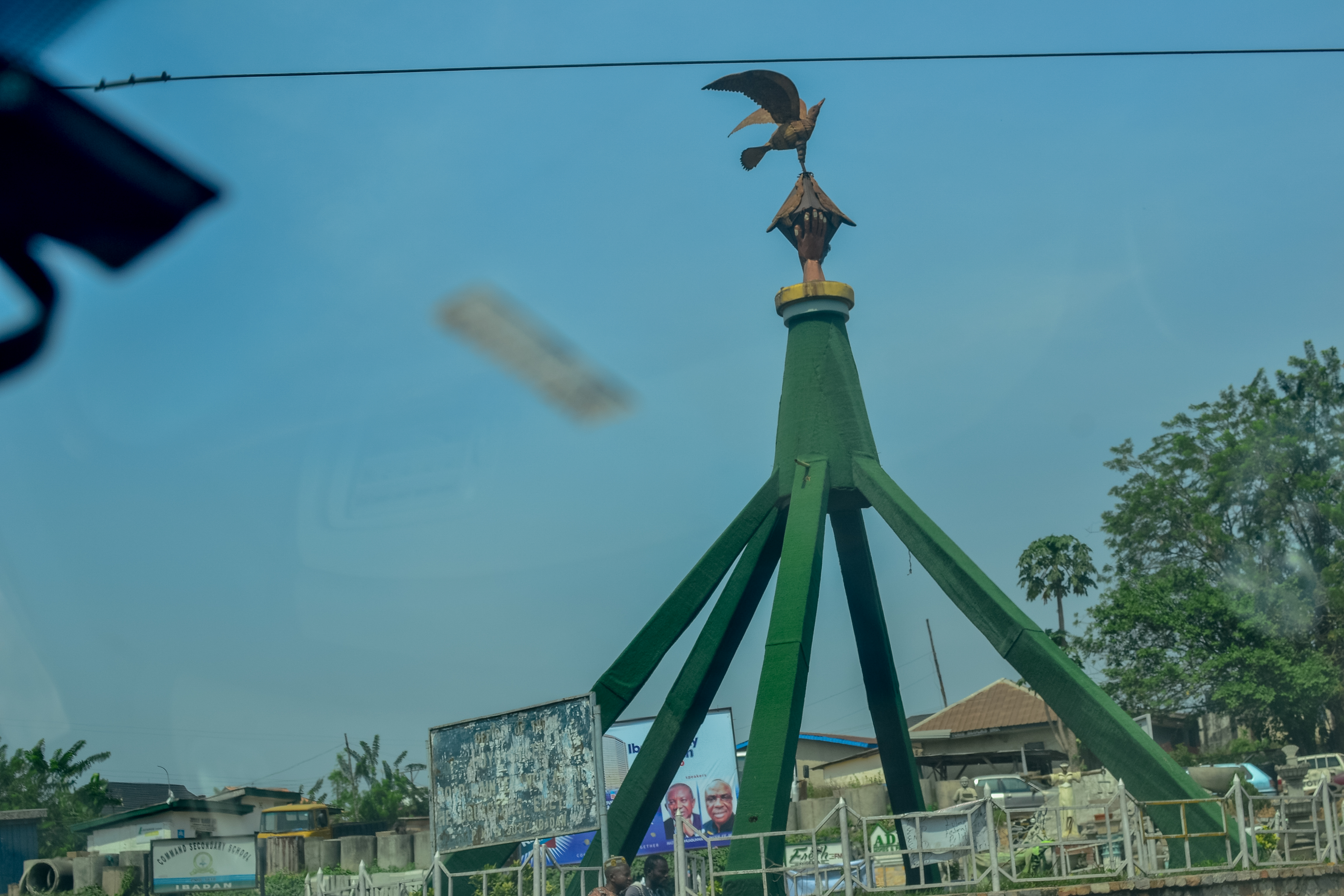
Dugbe roundabout, Ibadan

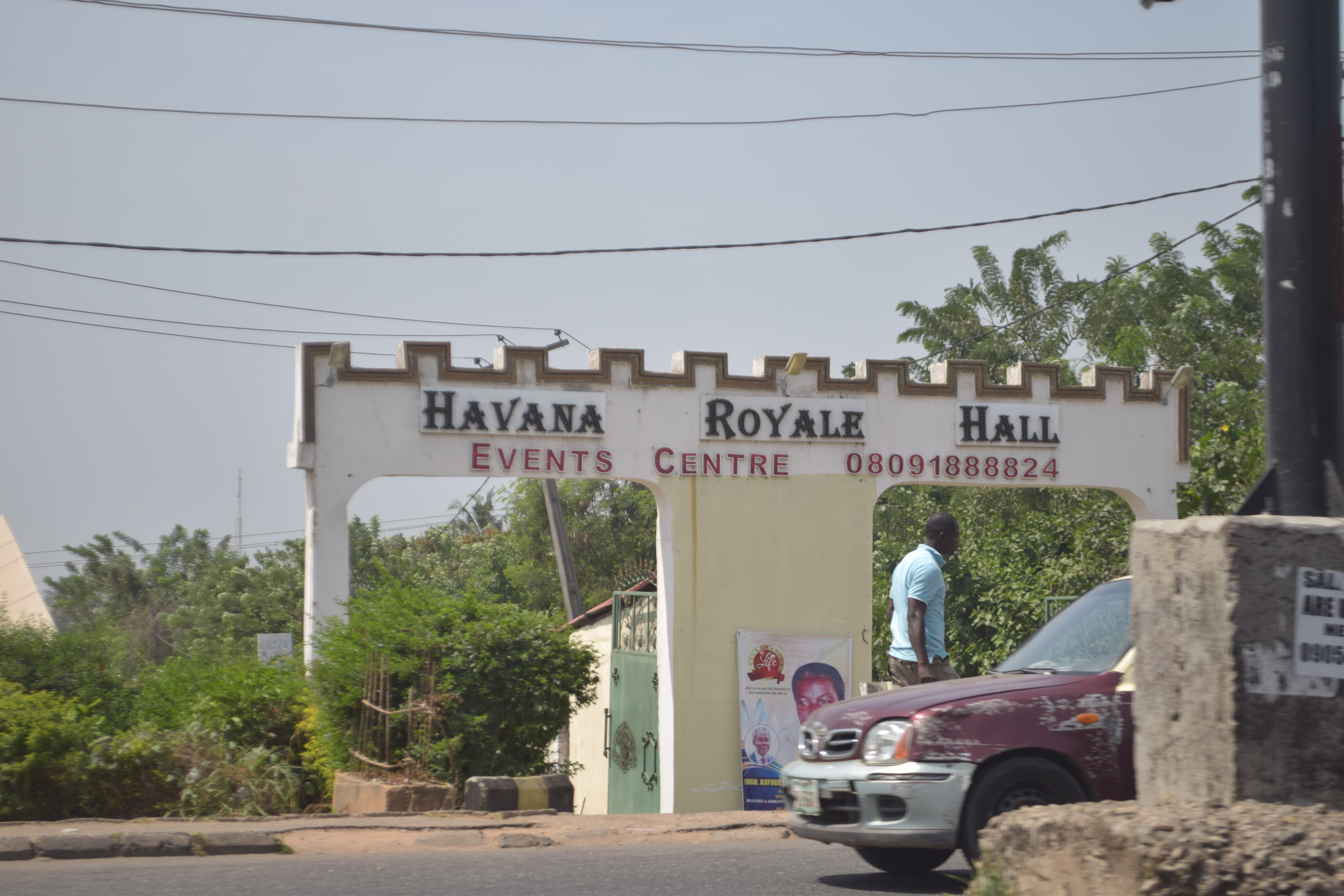
Havana Royale hall and event centre

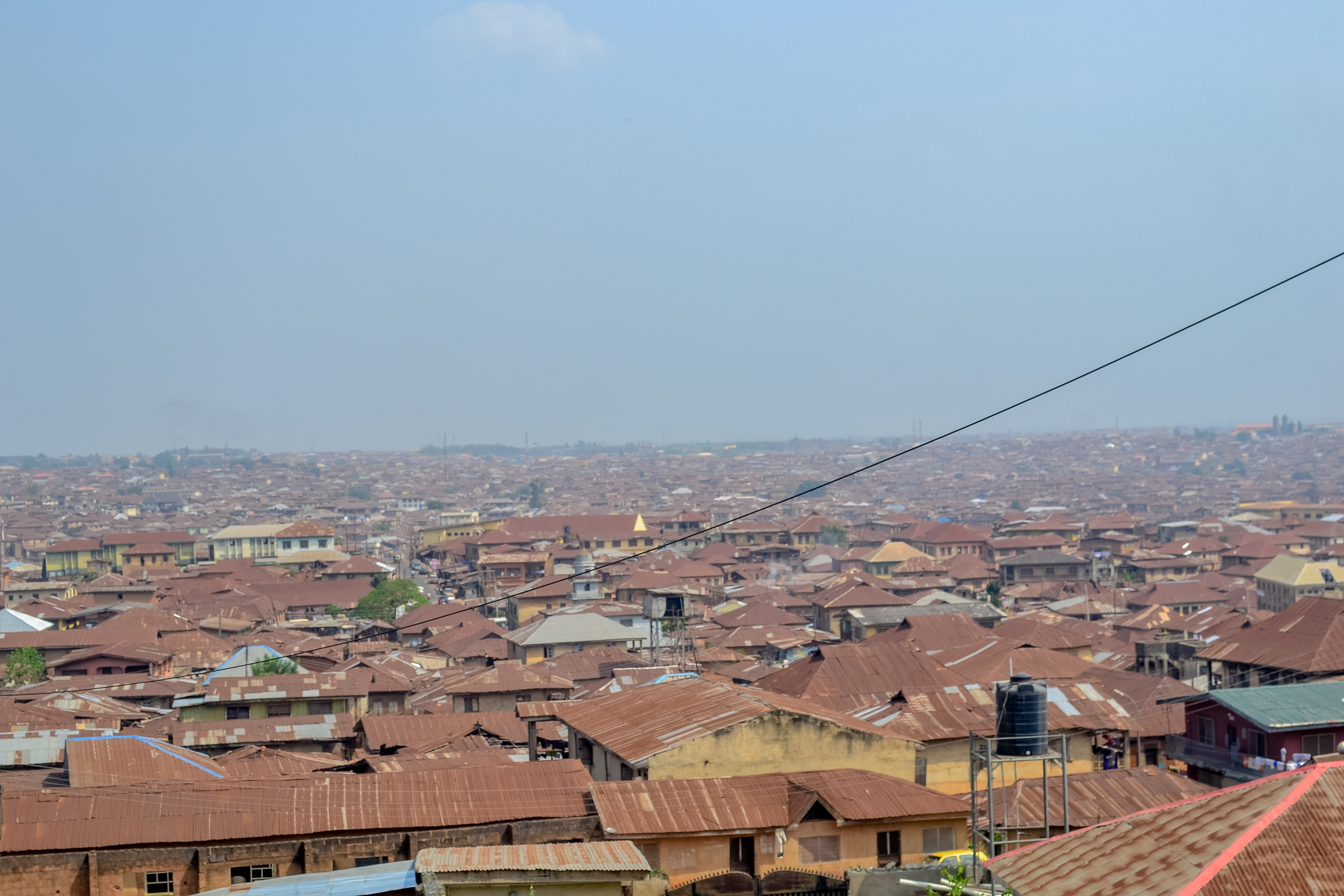
Ibadan brown roofs

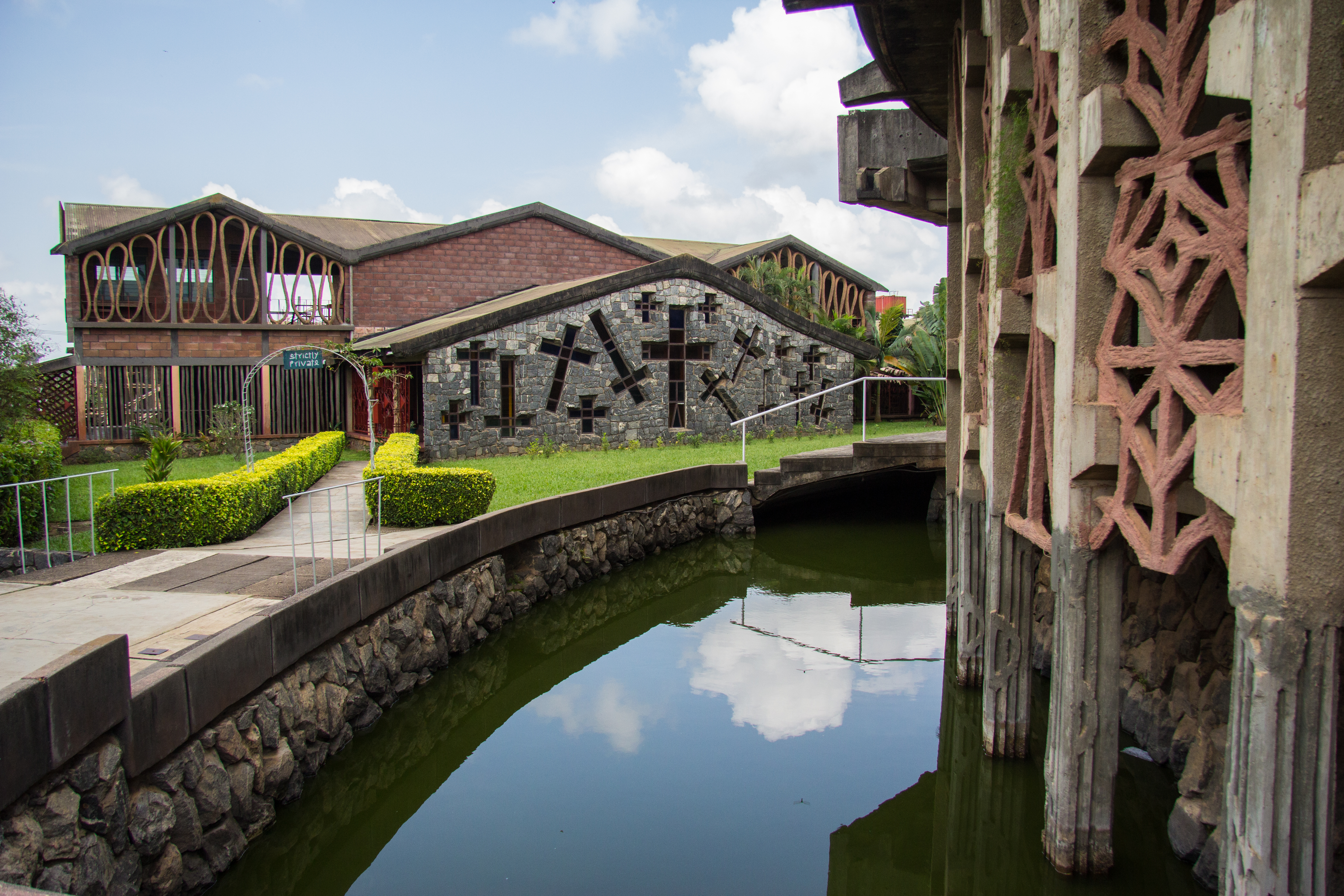
Dominican Chapel Ibadan, Church Hall

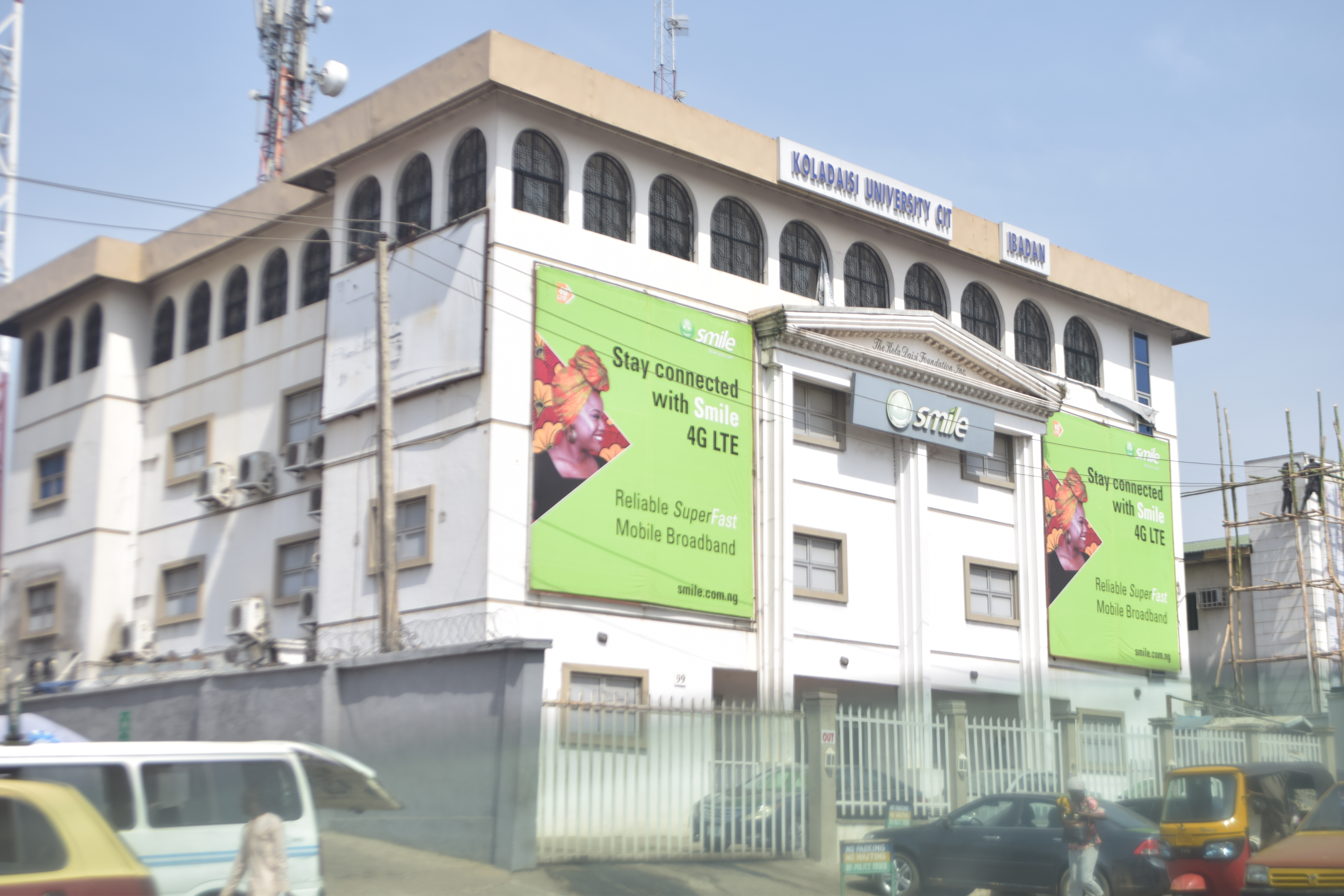
Kola Daisi University city building

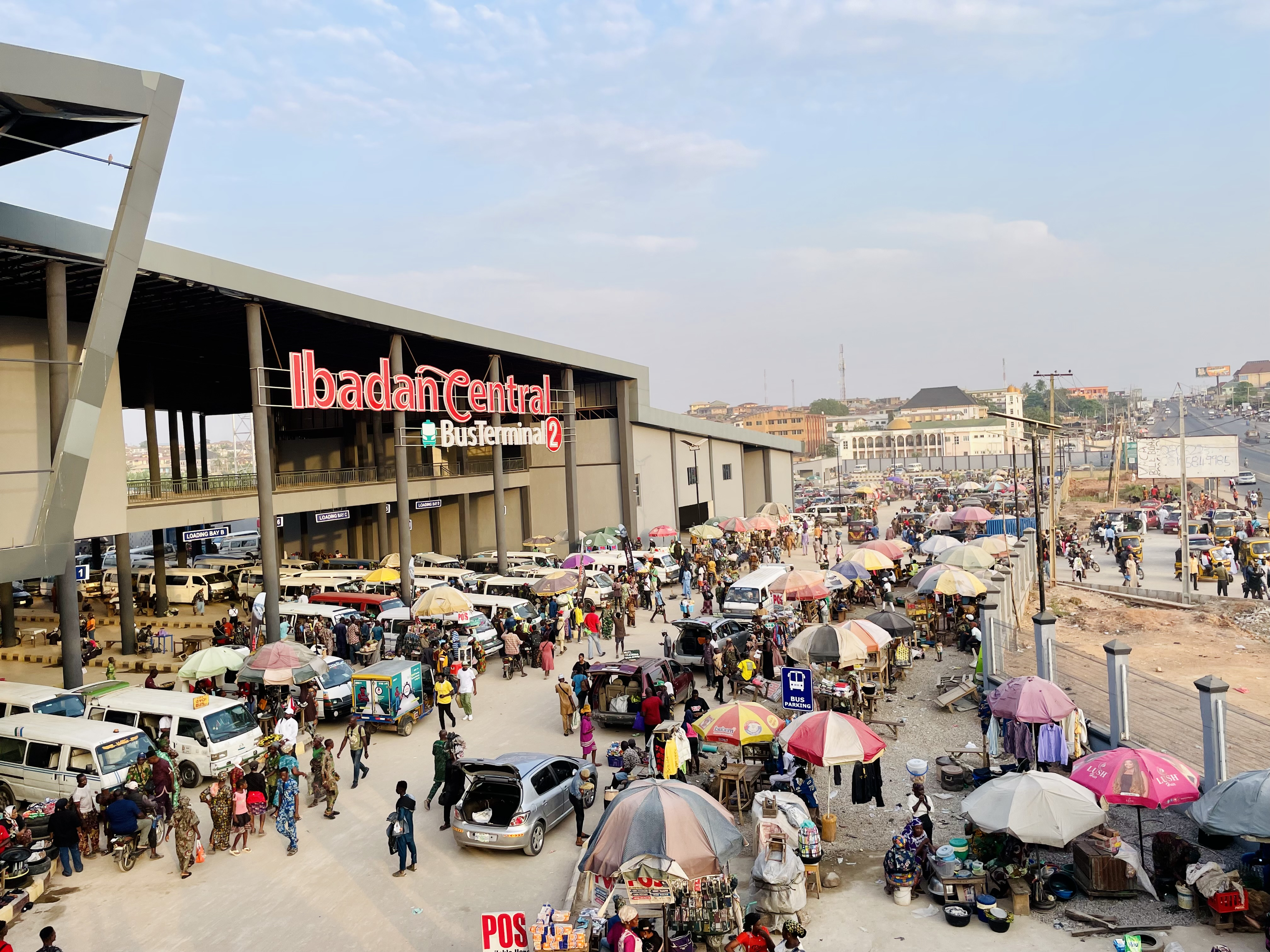
Iwo-Road Bus Terminal

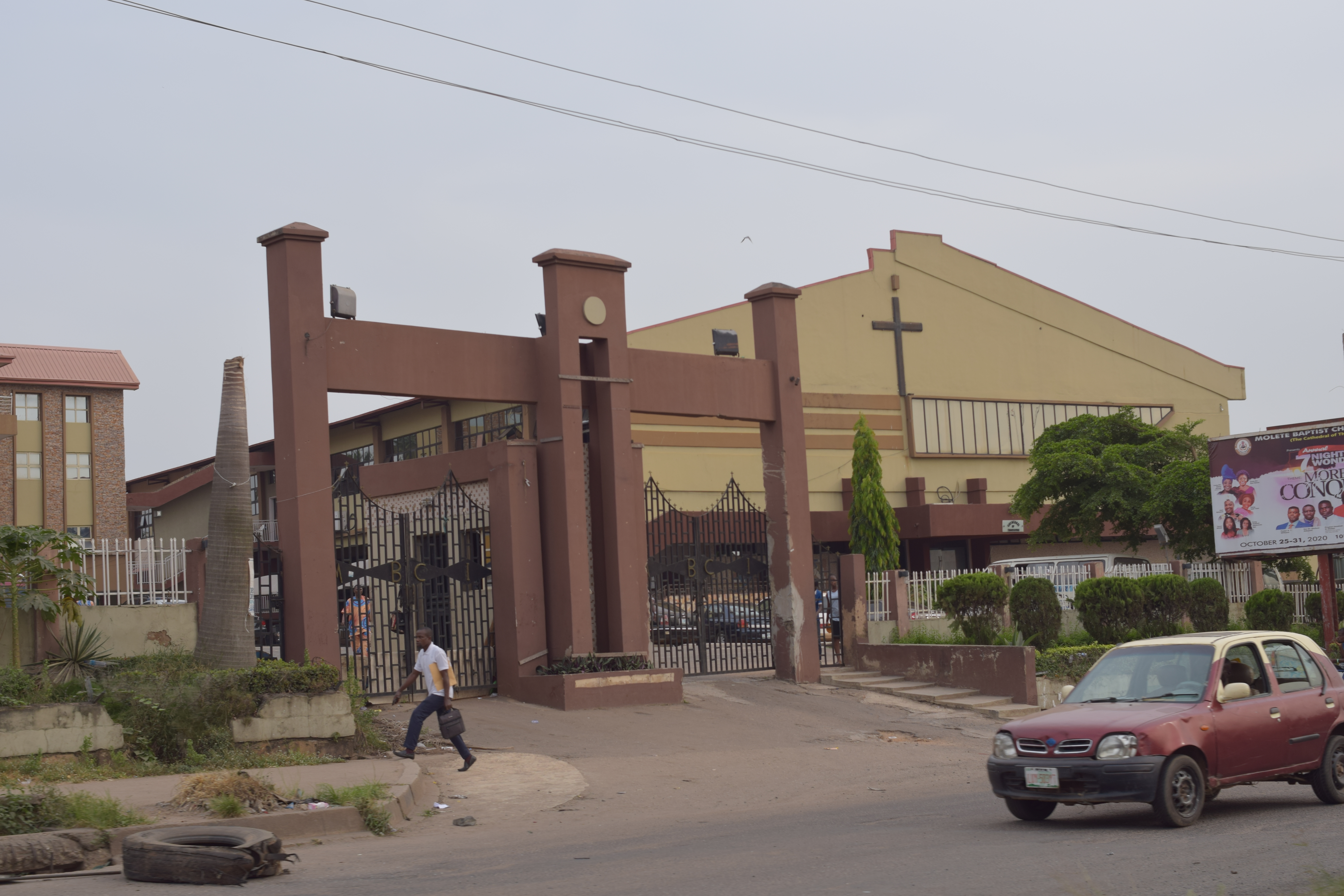
Molete Baptist church

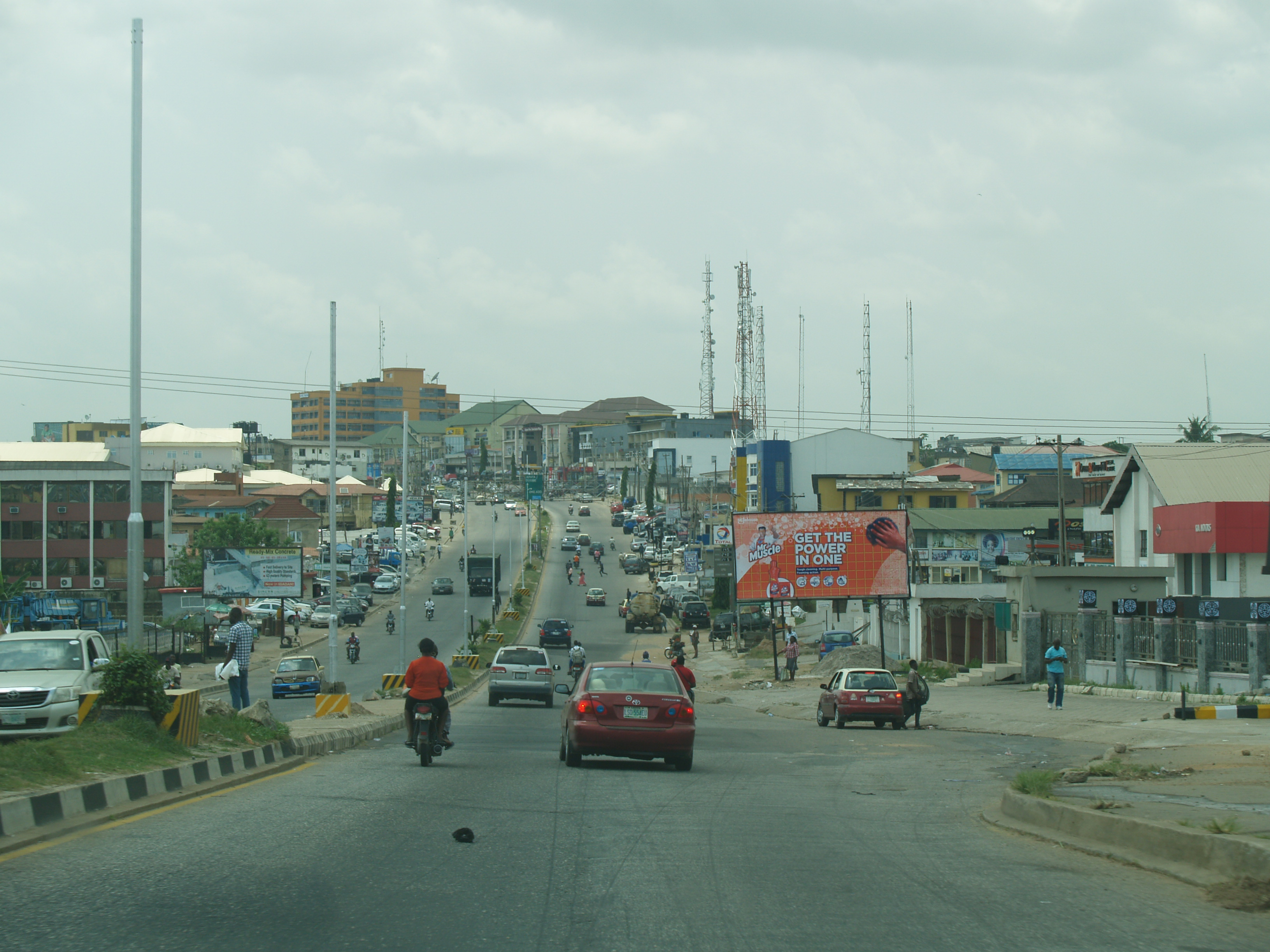
Ibadan ring road

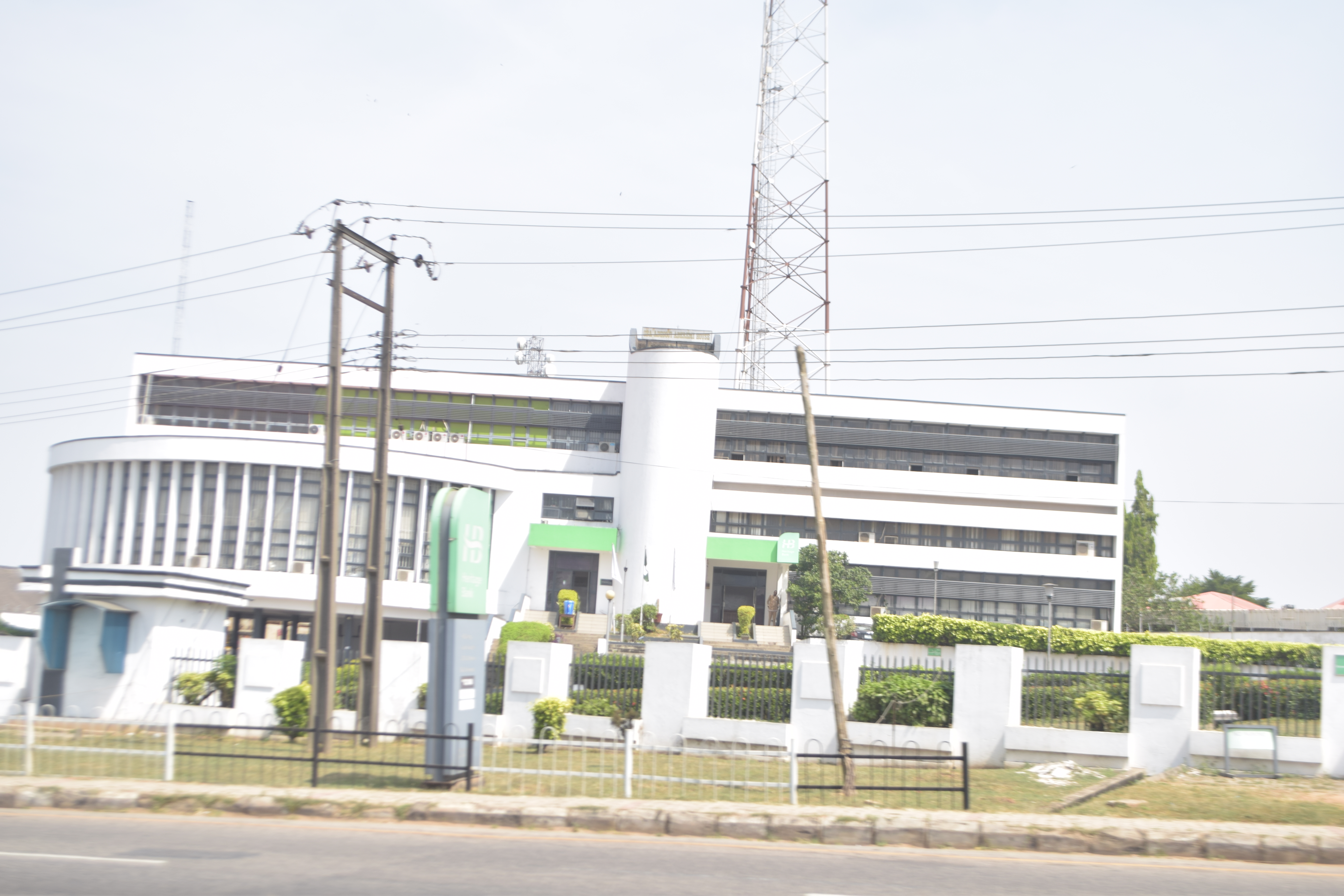
Oba Adesoji Adereni house

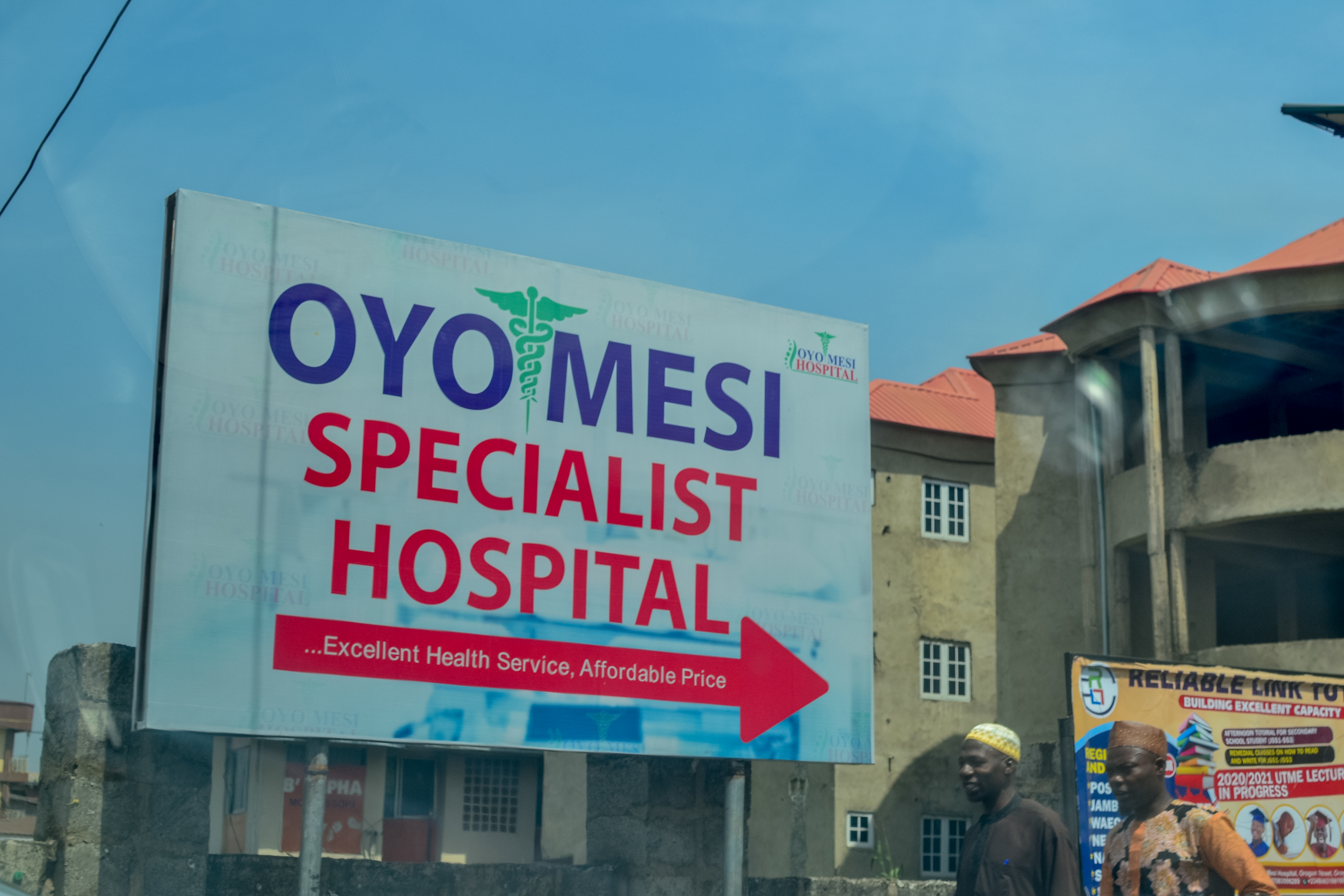
Specialist hospital

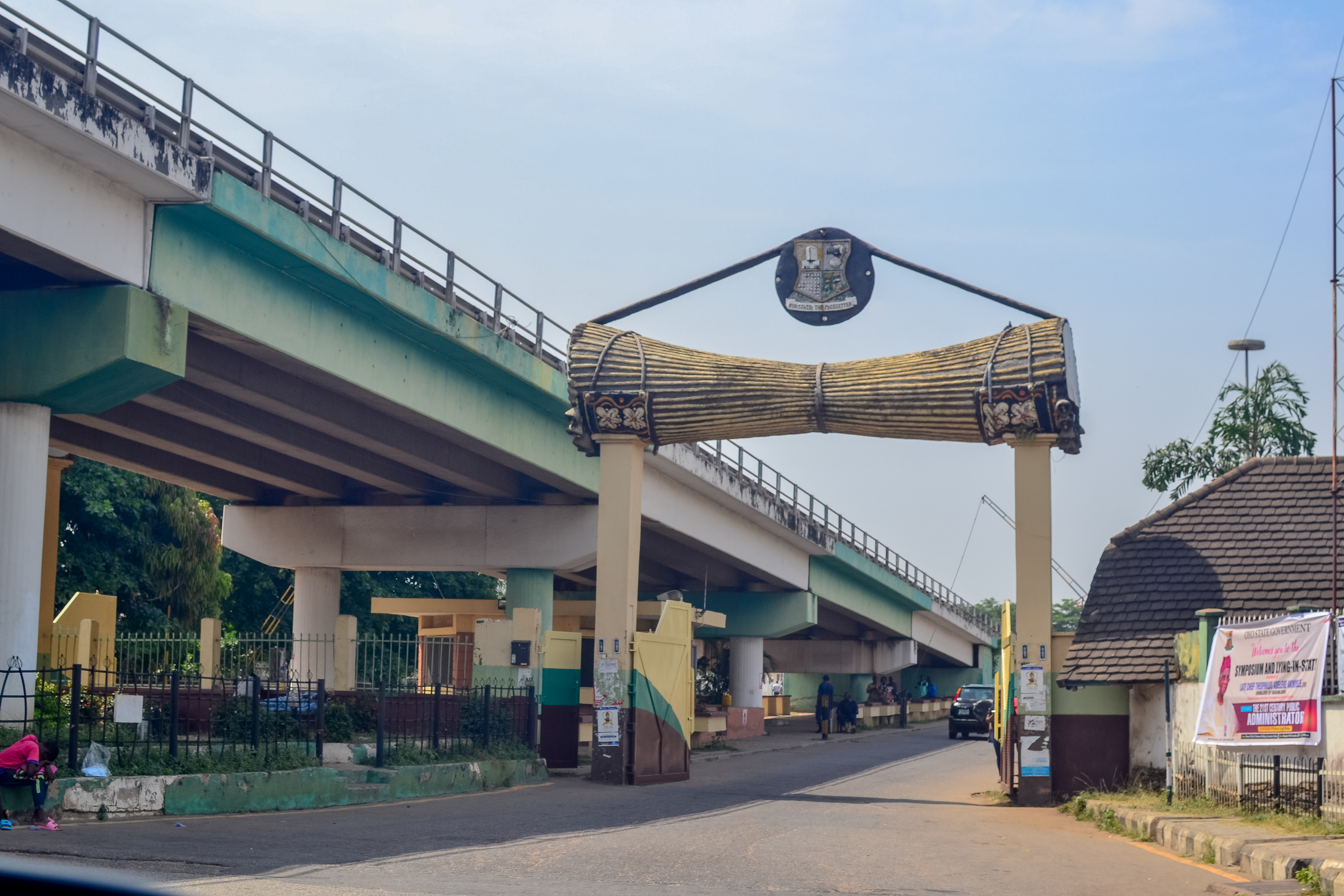
Government house gate

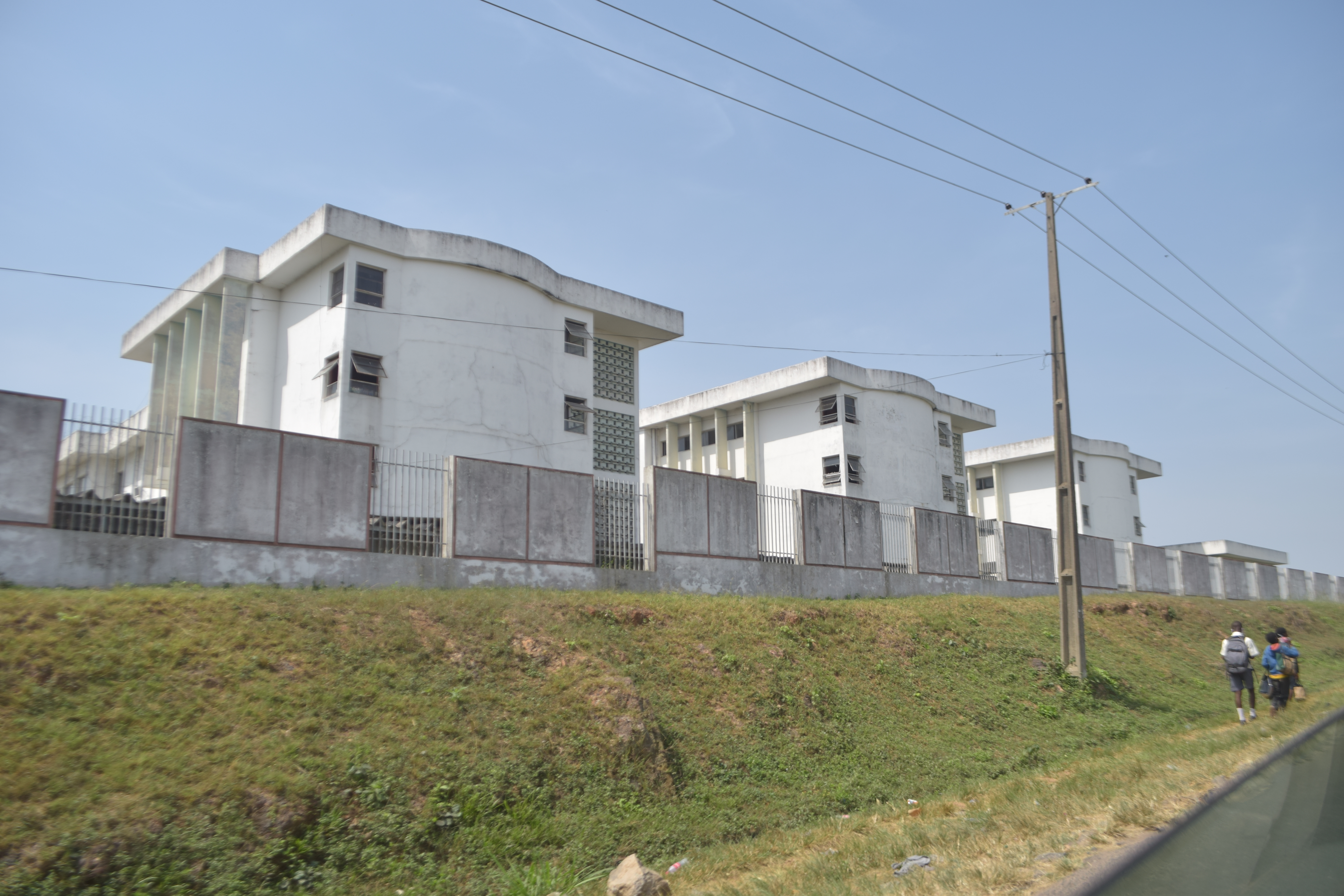
High court of Justice

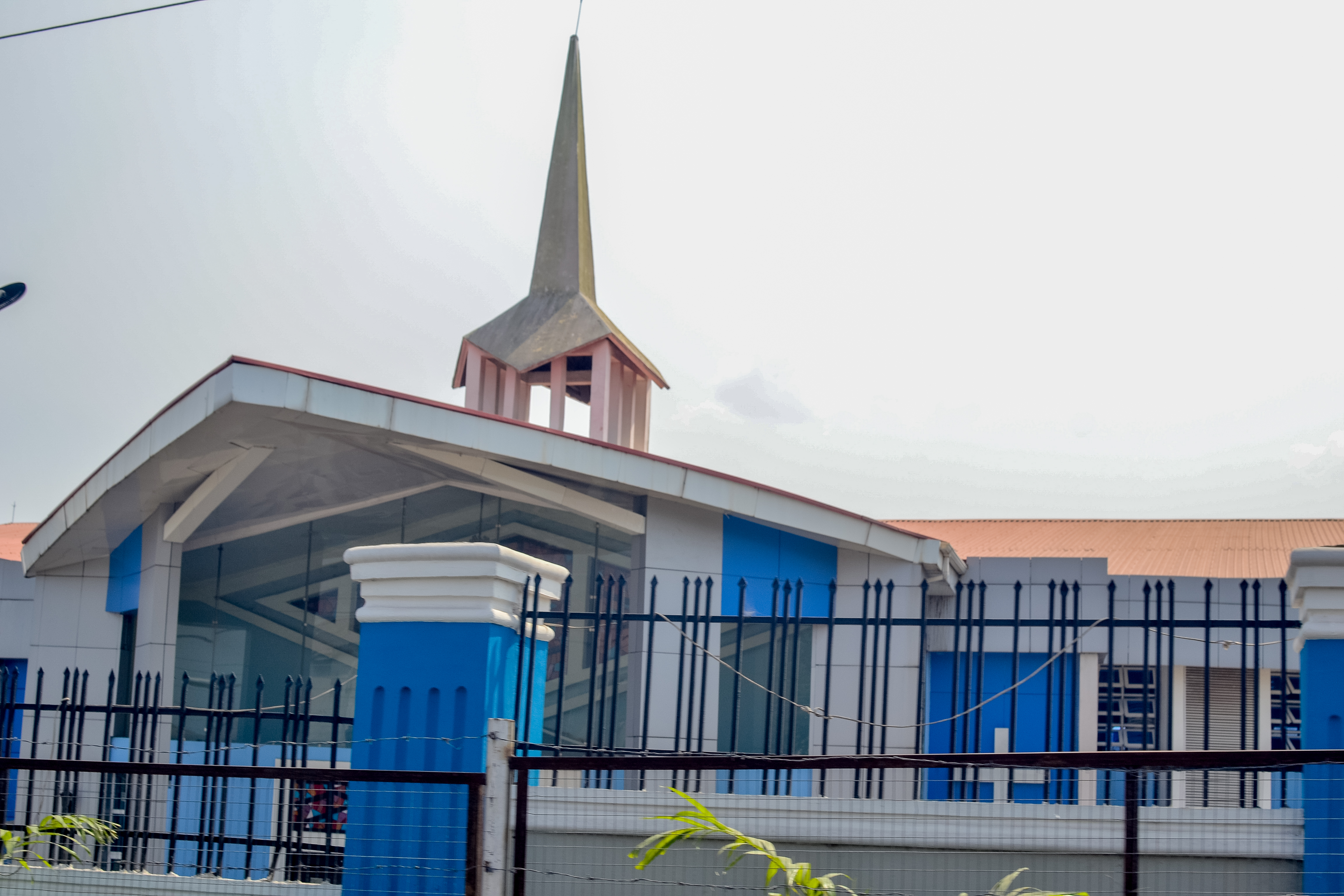
Presbyterian church

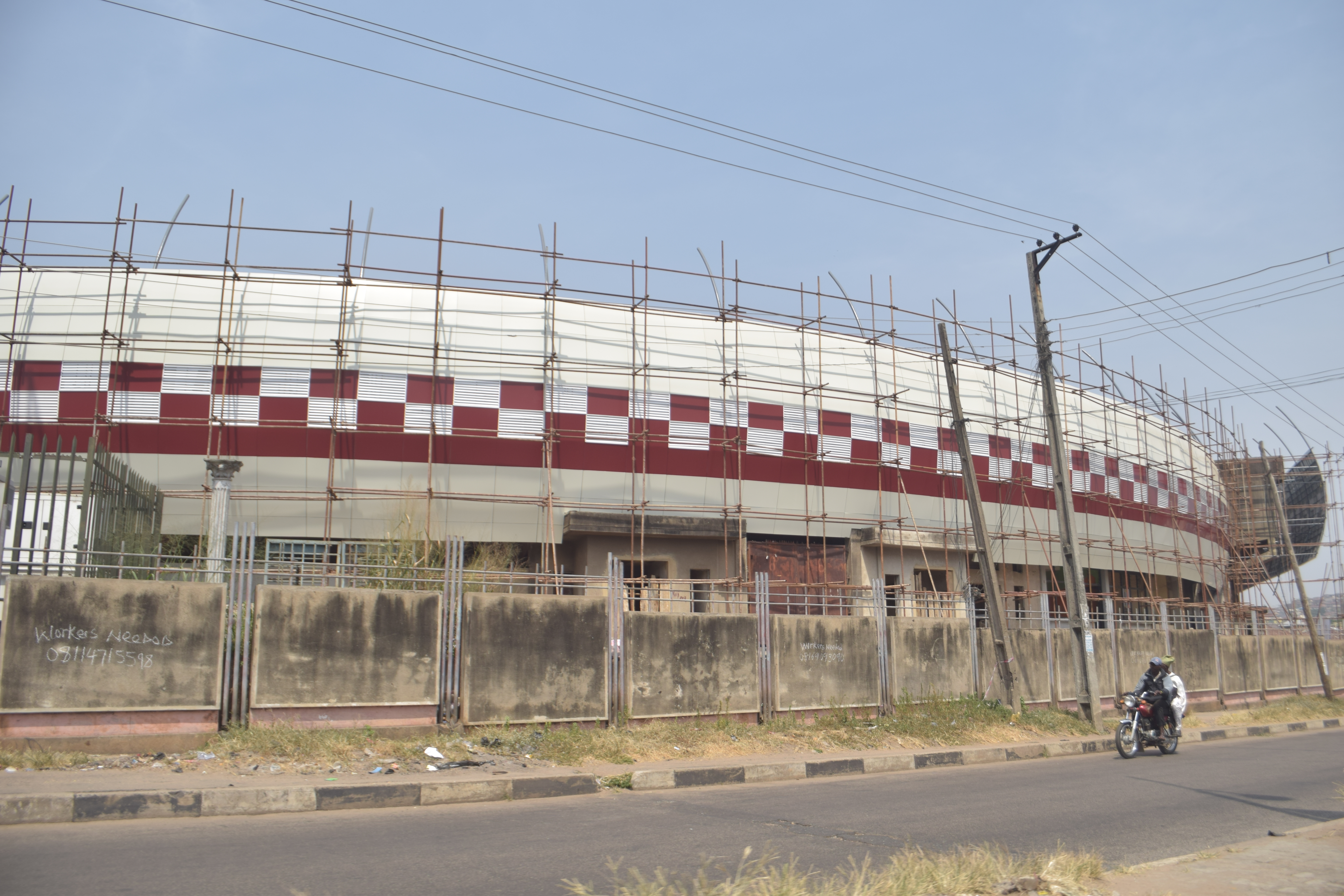
Stadium

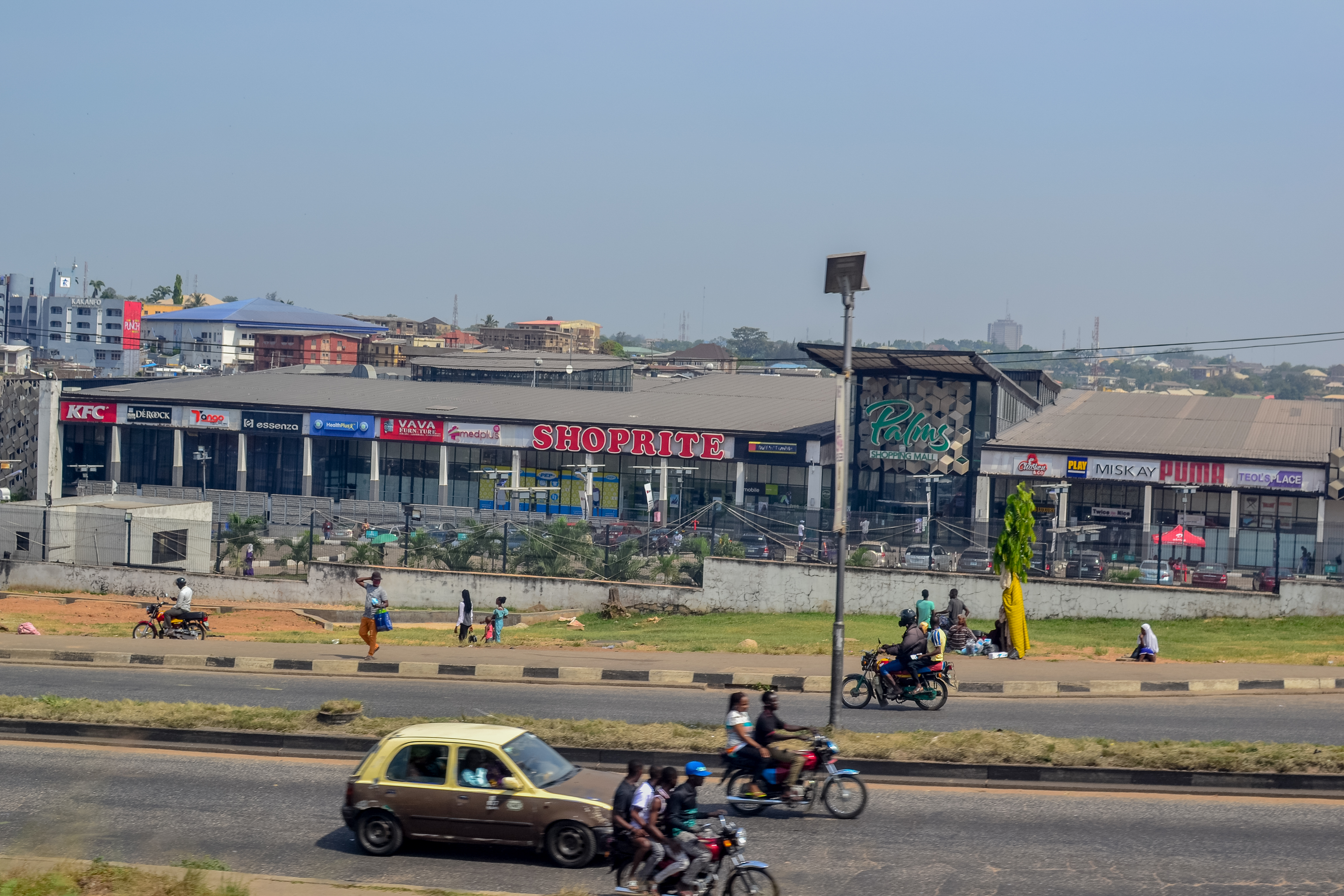
Shoprite

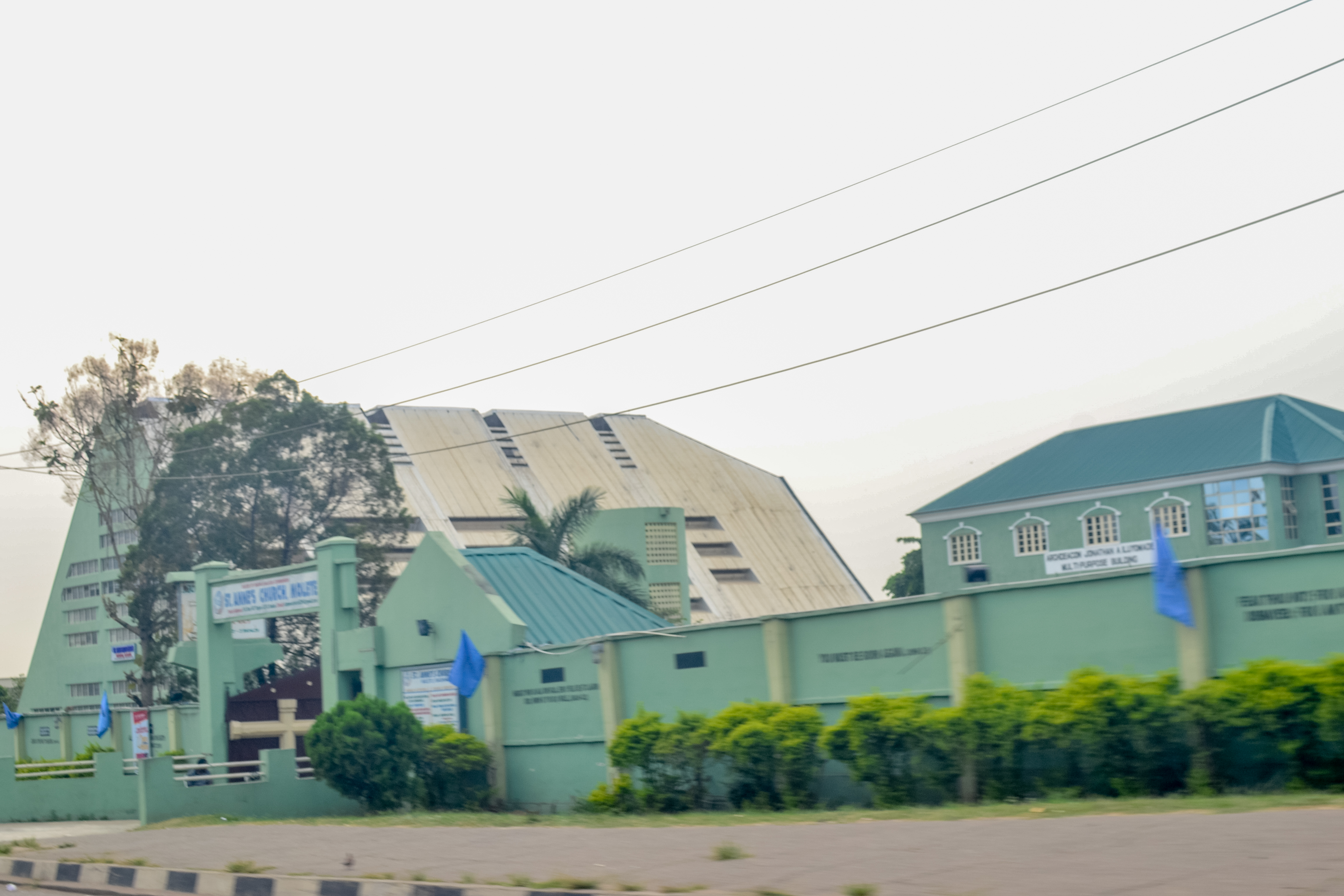
St. Annes Church

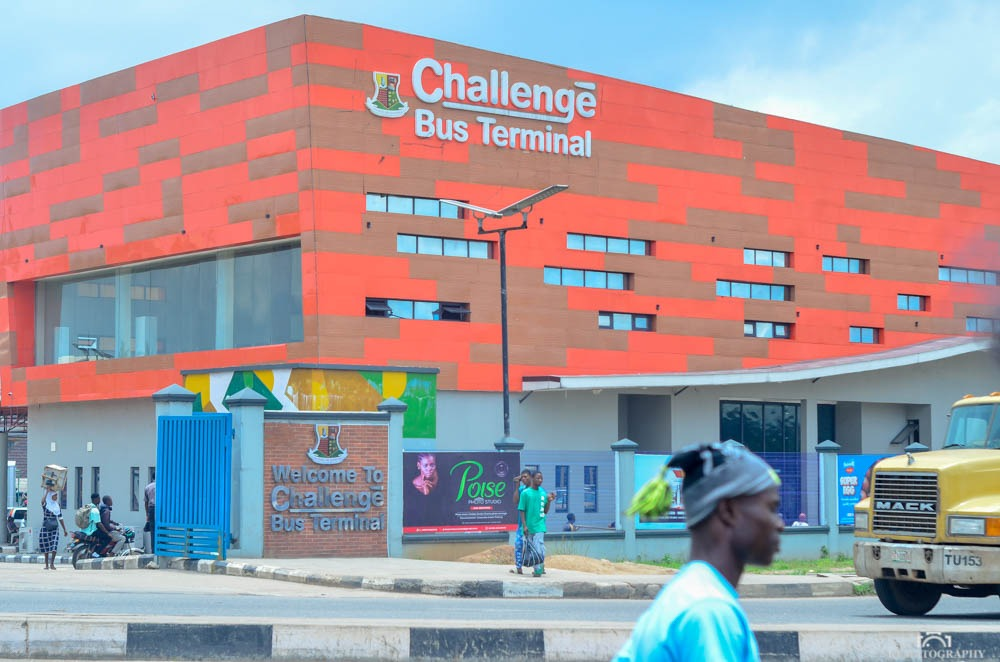
Challenge bus terminal

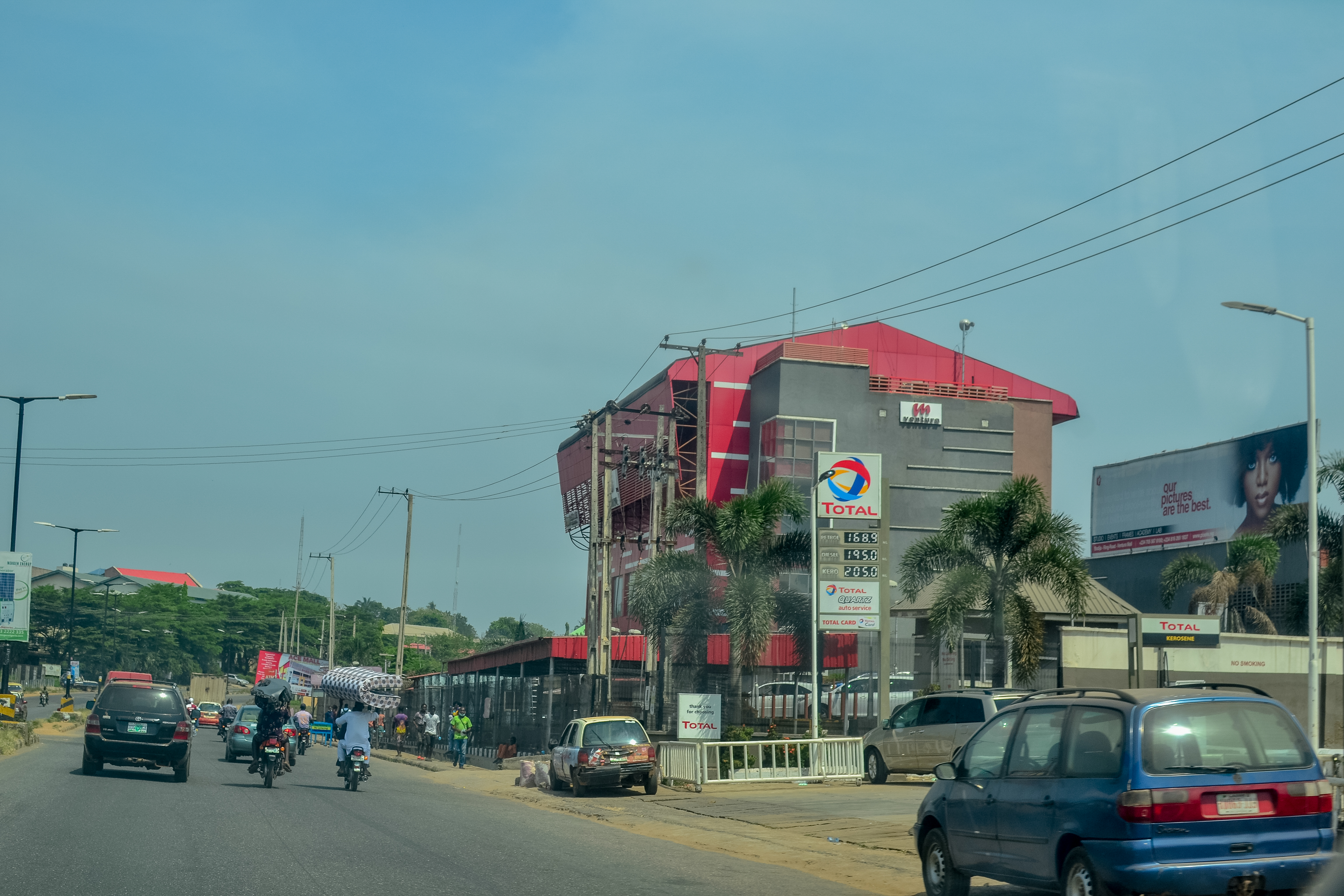
Ventura mall

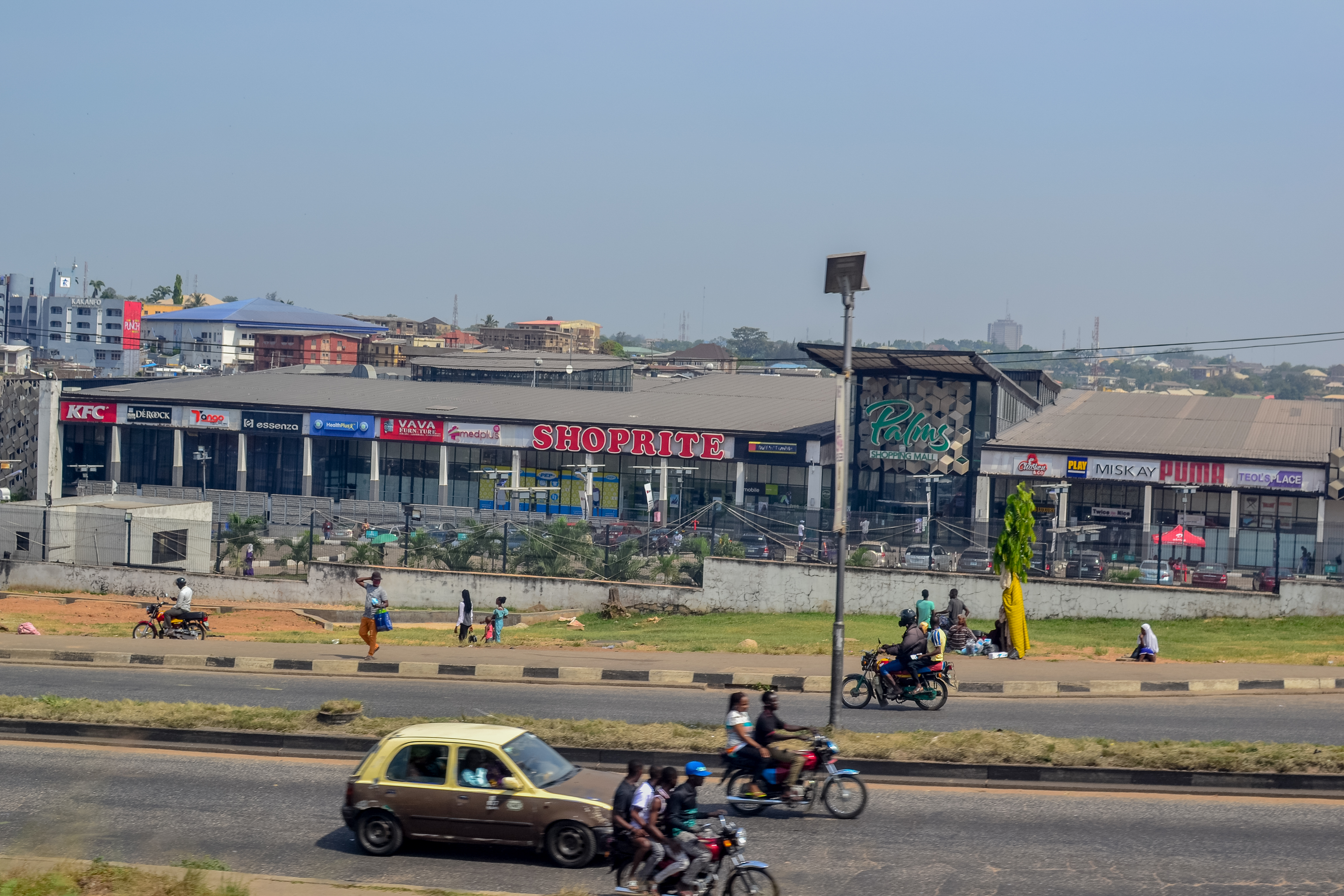
Shoprite, Ibadan

== See also ==
- Railway stations in Nigeria
- List of Nigerian cities by population
