= American Gods season 3 =

Season of television series

American Gods
- Season 3
- Promotional poster
- Showrunner: Charles H. Eglee
- Starring: Ricky Whittle; Emily Browning; Yetide Badaki; Bruce Langley; Omid Abtahi; Ashley Reyes; Ian McShane; Demore Barnes; Crispin Glover
- No. of episodes: 10

Release
- Original network: Starz
- Original release: January 10 – March 21, 2021

Season chronology
- ← Previous; Season 2

The third and final season of American Gods, based on Neil Gaiman's novel of the same name, was broadcast on Starz between January 10 and March 21, 2021, and consisted of ten episodes. Charles H. Eglee adapted the third season, serving as the showrunner after the departure of second-season showrunner Jesse Alexander and original series creators Bryan Fuller and Michael Green after the first season. The season was officially greenlit in March 2019 and production began in October 2019.

The season stars Ricky Whittle, Emily Browning, Yetide Badaki, Crispin Glover, Bruce Langley, Omid Abtahi, Demore Barnes and Ian McShane, who all return from the previous season, while Ashley Reyes joins the main cast.

The third season follows Shadow Moon as he moves to Lakeside, Wisconsin under a new name to hide from the New Gods.

== Cast and characters ==
=== Main ===
- Ricky Whittle as Shadow Moon / Mike Ainsel, a former convict who became Mr. Wednesday's bodyguard, but left the job after discovering he is Wednesday's estranged son.
- Emily Browning as Laura Moon, Shadow Moon's wife and a revenant.
- Yetide Badaki as Bilquis, a goddess of love, identified with the Queen of Sheba.
- Bruce Langley as Technical Boy, a New God of Technology who in 1893 had been a failed inventor.
- Omid Abtahi as Salim, an emerging gay Muslim man from Oman who moved to the U.S. and fell in love with a djinn.
- Ashley Reyes as Cordelia, a rebellious and tech savvy college dropout who works for Mr. Wednesday as his protégée, driver, and technology assistant.
- Ian McShane as Mr. Wednesday, the war-mongering Norse god Odin incarnated as a con artist.
- Demore Barnes as Mr. Ibis, the keeper of stories past and present, scribe to Old Gods. Egyptian god Thoth.
- Crispin Glover as Mr. World, the New God of globalization and the vicious leader of the New Gods.

=== Recurring ===
- Eric Johnson as Chad Mulligan, Lakeside's Chief of Police.
- Lela Loren as Marguerite Olsen, a local reporter in Lakeside who takes an interest in Shadow.
- Julia Sweeney as Ann-Marie Hinzelmann, the owner of a small convenience store and the unofficial self-appointed mayor of Lakeside.
- Marilyn Manson as Johan Wengren, the lead singer of the Viking death metal band Blood Death and a berserker.
- Blythe Danner as Demeter, the Greek goddess of the harvest who has an unresolved romantic history with Mr. Wednesday, who now goes by the name Caroline Wells.
- Herizen Guardiola as Oshun, the Yoruban goddess of love, purity, and fertility.
- Dominique Jackson as Ms. World, a second apparition of Mr. World.
- Denis O'Hare as Tyr, a former Norse god who in the past got his hand bitten off by the Fenrir, and who now is a dentist.
- Danny Trejo as a third apparition of Mr. World.
- Peter Stormare as Czernobog, Slavic god of darkness, death, and malevolence.
- Iwan Rheon as Liam Doyle, a charming, good-natured leprechaun.

=== Guests ===
- Devery Jacobs as Sam Black Crow, a half-Cherokee hitchhiking college student.
- Wale as Chango, an Orisha who has a link to Shadow's past.
- Graham Greene as Whiskey Jack, a Manitou who despises Mr. Wednesday.
- Daniel Jun as Tu Er Shen, a Chinese god who blesses a motel for giving him shelter.

== Episodes ==
No. overall	No. in season	Title	Directed by	Teleplay by	Original release date	U.S. viewers (millions)
17	1	"A Winter's Tale"	Jon Amiel	David Paul Francis	January 10, 2021	0.209
Three months have passed since Shadow discovered Wednesday is his father. Wednesday begins working with a viking themed death rocker named Johan, in order to source more worshipers. Mr. World changes form and becomes Ms. World, running a major tech project called Shard to influence global control. Frustrated by Wednesday's connection to Johan, she chastises Technical Boy for his various failures. As a result, Technical Boy makes contact with Bilquis, though she refuses to take a side and inadvertently causes Technical Boy to have a vision of himself being shot to death. Laura attempts to resurrect the corpse of Mad Sweeney, but accidentally disintegrates herself. Shadow attempts to live normally as Mike Ainsel. This is shattered when Wednesday makes contact and requests Shadow's presence to meet with local Native American God, Whiskey Jack. Shadow is forced back into service when a work promotion tips off government agents. Realizing they are about to be attacked by the agents, Wednesday uses his powers to allow Shadow and himself to flee into an alternate world. Whiskey Jack declines to support Wednesday but gives a prophecy that Shadow has a critical, though unknown role in the war. Wednesday introduces Shadow to his new assistant, a young woman named Cordelia. Wednesday urges Shadow to take shelter in the town of Lakeside. Suspicious of this, Shadow refuses. He later finds every other bus has been cancelled, leaving Lakeside his only option. Arriving in the town late at night, Shadow meets Ann-Marie Hinzelmann, a friendly local store owner, and Chad Mulligan, a police officer, who drives Shadow to his new apartment. Breaking his key on the lock, Shadow attempts to enter through a back-door, but finds a shotgun placed on his back.
18	2	"Serious Moonlight"	Julian Holmes	Moises Verneau	January 17, 2021	0.185
In 1690, a Native American girl is killed by foreigners as a tribute to Hödekin to prevent a deadly storm. Defusing a mistaken break in, Shadow meets his neighbor Marguerite Olsen. He is later given a tour of the town by Hinzelmann, who explains the town history and rituals. Shadow further connects with Chad, who helps provide a car owned by Marguerite. Bilquis consumes a would-be predator, but becomes sick afterwards. Salim meets with Mr. Ibis to seek knowledge of the Jinn's whereabouts, suspecting Wednesday's actions. Wednesday goes to visit Tyr, the Norse God of war, who now works as a dentist, and finds out Tyr has kept contact with a former lover of Wednesday's named Demeter. Shadow attends the funeral for Zorya Vechernyaya. Wednesday crashes the funeral and rallies those attending to take vengeance. Following her instructions, Shadow brings the silver coin to Zorya Polunochnaya, who places it back in the sky. Cordelia and Shadow connect over their shared history with Wednesday. Returning to Lakeside, Shadow discovers that a young woman named Alison has gone missing, and he is considered the suspect, though Chad tentatively clears him by checking his alibis.
19	3	"Ashes and Demons"	Thomas Carter	Anne Kenney	January 24, 2021	0.160
In 1765, a farmer woman performs a sacrificial ritual to Demeter and is rewarded with a fresh harvest. In the present, members of Johan's band turn up murdered, while Wednesday prepares to meet with Demeter by securing a suitable gift. Living as a patient in a mental health facility, Demeter reacts with anger at seeing Wednesday. Producing a marriage certificate, Wednesday attempts to get her released, though Demeter states she is happy in the facility, as she is being worshiped by fellow patients. She does however express temptation at Wednesday's efforts. Laura arrives in purgatory and is met by bureaucratic waiting. Confronting visions of her past, she eventually accepts that she was not responsible for everything bad in her life, and is granted passage back to living. Bilquis, still feeling the after-effects of her last victim, is confronted by an unknown figure. Shadow helps the search for Alison, though no leads can be located. Returning home, Shadow bonds with Marguerite and meets her younger son. Gifted a historical journal of Lakeside, he learns that Marguerite's eldest son went missing under similar circumstances to Alison. Following a nightmare, Shadow is compelled to visit Bilquis and discovers Technical Boy in her home covered in blood.
20	4	"The Unseen"	Eva Sørhaug	Nick Gillie	January 31, 2021	0.204
Mr. Ibis tells the story of slaves who bring their African gods with them to the new land of America. Denying knowledge of what happened to her, Technical Boy teams up with a reluctant Shadow to find Bilquis, with Technical Boy ultimately seeking answers to glitches that began due to Bilquis. Finding clues in the apartment, they follow a trail to the daughter of Bilquis' most recent victim, who they suspect arranged a violent kidnapping. Reverting to his original form, Mr. World goes to meet with a captive Bilquis, piecing together that her victim was needed for the Shard project. Using a disguise, Mr. World implores her captors to execute Bilquis. Experiencing visions of her past, Bilquis realizes she is connected to other African Gods. Seeking to free Demeter, Wednesday and Cordelia dig into the financial records of the head of the facility. Visiting a viking themed bar, Wednesday meets Johan, who is grieving the loss of his band mates. Wednesday suggests that Johan move on from his grief and immediately form a new band to gain more worshipers. Enraged by this, Johan instead blows up the bar, killing all the humans inside and requiring a seemingly delirious Wednesday to be hospitalized. Laura returns to the living, finding that she is no longer reliant on Sweeney's coin to survive but that Sweeney's corpse has been cremated. Carrying his ashes, Laura sets out on her new journey.
21	5	"Sister Rising"	Nick Copus	Damian Kindler	February 14, 2021	0.123
At the Chicago's World Fair of 1893, a struggling inventor with the same appearance as Technical Boy presents an early robotic creation to apathetic response. Feeling jealous, a magician named Maximilian suggests the inventor add more flash to the presentation. The inventor simulates functionality of the robot that isn't possible, but the magician gleefully exposes the fraud to a crowd and then steals the audience for his own show. In the present, an imprisoned Bilquis has a spiritual awakening, learning that she no longer needs to consume worshipers for power. Drawing on new abilities, Bilquis frees herself from captivity. Shadow and Technical Boy run into her while attempting her rescue, with Technical Boy fleeing in fear. Bilquis expresses her gratitude at the effort Shadow made and the two of them connect over dinner. Wednesday is placed as a patient in the same facility as Demeter. Shadow goes to meet him, and Wednesday reveals he has arranged an elaborate con to free Demeter. Agreeing to partner with Cordelia, Shadow organizes a heist to steal the hard drive of the head of the facility. Upon success, the pair use blackmail to secure the release of Demeter in two days time. Wednesday decides to use this time to convince Demeter to leave of her own free will, desiring her support for the war. Laura goes to meet with Ibis and Salim. Convincing Salim to go with her, the pair venture out to seek vengeance upon Wednesday. Technical Boy, still undergoing painful glitches seeks shelter in a lair that contains the 1893 robot. Returning to Lakeside, Shadow encounters Laura.
22	6	"Conscience of the King"	Mark Tinker	Aric Avelino	February 21, 2021	0.197
In the early days of the American revolution, Tyr and Odin work as soldiers to enjoy the spoils of warfare, with Demeter as their shared love. In the present day, Wednesday works to woo Demeter while they are both still in the facility. Putting together an elaborate shadow play, Wednesday tells a story to the facility about his past Revolutionary War experiences and how he stole the love of Demeter from Tyr and came to marry her, though they eventually parted ways due to the loss of their child. Tyr arrives at the facility and clashes with Wednesday over their divergent life paths. Demeter agrees to accept her release, though decides to part ways with Wednesday once more, leaving Wednesday emotionally shattered. Laura states her desires to kill Wednesday, though Shadow is unwilling to help her. Returning to a motel, Salim and Laura struggle to find a way to locate Wednesday. In Lakeside, the search for Alison continues to be fruitless, with the town now fearing the worst. Shadow bumps into Sam Black Crow while preparing for a dinner with Marguerite. Sam reveals she is the half-sister of Marguerite. Sam agrees not to reveal Shadow's identity to Marguerite and tells Shadow that Marguerite's eldest son went missing, with it assumed to be a custody issue, though Sam is skeptical of this theory. Shadow apprehends a local thief and discovers the thief has stolen women's underwear. Seeking treatment for his glitches, Technical Boy attempts to analyze himself with a computer program, but is unable to find answers. The computer asks for something called "Artifact One", though Technical Boy is baffled by this request. Mr. World (who has taken on a new form), denies knowledge of Artifact One, but is shown possessing a rock in a secret vault. Mr. World later goes to meet with Laura and Salim, expressing that the three of them have a "common enemy".
23	7	"Fire and Ice"	Rachel Goldberg	Anne Kenney & David Paul Francis	February 28, 2021	0.180
Wednesday becomes despondent over the loss of Demeter. Cordelia and Wednesday encounter a burning corpse that falls from the sky. Guessing that the perpetrator is a berserker (who he explains to be Johan's true identity), and connecting this to the deaths of Johan's band, Wednesday and Cordelia arrive in Lakeside to warn Shadow that a killer is using a pattern of seeking out followers of Wednesday. Tracking Johan's trail, Wednesday makes his way to Tyr's dentist office but finds that Johan has been murdered, ruling him out as the killer. Shadow begins looking into local man Derek, who he has learned was the thief he previously spotted. Derek denies any connection to Alison. While learning to ice skate, Shadow experiences visions that indicate to him there is something wrong with the frozen lake. Shadow and Marguerite consummate their mutual attraction. Mr. World explains to Laura and Salim that, while he greatly desires to kill Wednesday, carrying out such an act would be a direct act of war, and the new gods aren't ready for that yet. With that in mind, Mr. World points out that Laura doing so would be a convenient loophole and offers to personally help her locate the lost spear of Gungnir. Salim is greatly unsettled by this notion, but Laura remains determined. Salim helps to negotiate favorable terms to Laura to ensure her safety after the assassination is complete. Bilquis further develops her new connections and abilities. Attending a local party, Bilquis meets with the midwife who helped Shadow be born as an infant and learns Shadow has a major destiny. Tyr collects Shadow from Lakeside and is revealed to the audience to be the killer of Wednesday's followers.
24	8	"The Rapture of Burning"	Tim Southam	Holly Moyer	March 7, 2021	0.110
In 1951, a Chinese God named Tu Er Shen takes shelter in a motel called The Peacock, after being caught in a homosexual act. The motel owner, Toni, successfully gets rid of the police and expresses a shared kinship with Shen. In gratitude, Shen declares The Peacock a temple for those being persecuted for their love, granting the motel supernatural protection. In the present day, Laura and Salim follow directions to arrive at The Peacock, seeking a leprechaun named Liam Doyle. Salim meets a worker named Kai who expresses an immediate interest in a hesitant Salim. Laura finds out from Liam that he was the one hired by Wednesday to kill her, though Liam turned down the job and lost his lucky coin as punishment. Offering him Sweeney's coin, Liam reluctantly agrees to help Laura find the lost spear. Though she initially fears being cheated, Liam eventually returns with the spear and decides to travel with Laura. Following Kai's invitation, Salim attends a party and meets with Toni, who helps Salim deal with his repressed feelings of sexuality. Feeling he can be open for the first time in his life, Salim bonds romantically with Kai and peacefully parts ways with Laura, with both of them deciding to let go of their lost loves and move on. Seeking treatment for his glitches, Ms. World forces a virtual reality helmet onto Technical Boy. Encountering a digital alternate version of Bilquis, Technical Boy learns that his glitches are the result of him denying his emotions and that he needs to locate Artifact One. Traveling with Tyr, Shadow is successfully drugged and held as a hostage to lure out Wednesday. Tyr explains to Shadow that he is ultimately seeking justice for past wrongs dating back to Norse Mythological times. Wednesday transports Tyr and Shadow into a recreation of Viking times and duels Tyr. Shadow distracts Tyr to allow Wednesday victory and declares happily that Shadow is now free from any remaining debts. Shadow decides to take a detour and look into Marguerite's missing eldest son.
25	9	"The Lake Effect"	Metin Hüseyin	Laura Pusey & Damian Kindler	March 14, 2021	0.153
The launch of the Shard project is accompanied by a marketing blitz and massive interest from mortals. Shadow returns to Lakeside, having looked into Marguerite's eldest son and concluding that he also disappeared, similar to Alison. He learns however that evidence was found at Derek's home to suggest he killed Alison, with Derek later seeming to commit suicide. Chad desires to put the matter to rest, but Shadow digs into archives that indicate a missing child has occurred under slightly different circumstances every few years for many decades. Following through with his recurring dreams, Shadow realizes that Alison's body has been stashed in a car that is placed on the ice of Lakeside in a yearly ritual. After nearly drowning in the frozen lake, Shadow awakes in the home of Hinzelmann, learning that she is an Old God herself. Hinzelmann justifies the deaths, pointing out that through the recurring sacrifice of a minor, she is able to bless the town, and ensure that all within it are protected. Admitting that she only allowed Shadow to stay in town as a debt to Wednesday, she attempts to kill Shadow, but is interrupted by Chad and killed by their combined effort. Liam offers to teach Laura how to use the spear, but seeing that she is facing difficulties, offers her Sweeney's coin, telling her that whatever throw she makes will be empowered by immense luck. Wednesday meets with Czernobog and states that he now wishes for peace with the New Gods, and has set a meeting with Mr. World to plan mutual terms and avoid war. Wednesday explains wearily that he accepts that efforts are hopeless against the overwhelming might of the New Gods. Agreeing to go with Wednesday, the two Old Gods meet with Mr. World, but are told that rather than peace, the New Gods are intending to eliminate the Old through the Shard project. Tipped off by Mr. World, Laura interrupts the meeting, and uses her lucky throw of the spear to successfully kill Wednesday. Shadow returns home to Marguerite, who tells him that she is leaving Lakeside for good. Shadow senses that Wednesday has died.
26	10	"Tears of the Wrath-Bearing Tree"	Russell Fine	Laura Pusey & Ryan Spencer	March 21, 2021	0.182
Shadow and Ibis arrive at the "Center of America Motel", a feared neutral ground that saps the powers of New and Old Gods, in order to have a peaceful handover of Wednesday's corpse. Mr. World arranges for Laura to be in the motel. During the handover process, Mr. World sells out Laura to the Old Gods as the assassin of Wednesday, claiming that Laura acted alone. Czernobog flies into a rage and threatens to kill her, but Shadow steps in to protect Laura from retribution. Shadow and Laura realize that they have drifted apart and part ways in anger. Laura is later visited in the motel by Bilquis. Honoring the agreement he first made with Wednesday long ago, Shadow volunteers to sit vigil, an old Norse tradition that requires him to be hung from the neck and bound to the World Tree for nine days. Technical Boy discovers that Mr. World possesses Artifact One and is storing it in a high tech vault. After finding the Artifact, Mr. World informs Technical Boy that, rather than being a New God of technology, Technical Boy is the Old God Prometheus, with fire being the first technology given to man, and his form, memories and personality changing over the millennia as technology evolved. Mr. World mocks that "this is the age of manipulation" and that trickery is his power. Realizing that Mr. World is likely not a New God either, Technical Boy demands to know his true identity, but World cheerfully leaves Technical Boy locked in the vault. While hung from the tree, Shadow experiences series of surreal visions and eventually enters a dream world that replicates the airplane where he first met Wednesday. He is greeted by Wednesday, who reveals that he engineered his own death and that Shadow, as both his son and a demigod himself, has now effectively given his own life and power as a blood sacrifice to Wednesday, granting immense power at the expense of Shadow's demise. Shadow reacts with rage, but is powerless to fight and dies on the tree. Back in the real world, Wednesday's corpse vanishes and Ibis remarks in fear that they will soon face something much worse than just the death of the Old Gods.

== Production ==
=== Development ===
The series was renewed for a third season by Starz on March 15, 2019, and it was confirmed that Charles H. Eglee would serve as showrunner for the third season replacing Jesse Alexander. The season consisted of ten episodes, Alongside Eglee, the season is executive produced by Neil Gaiman, Anne Kenney, Damian Kindler, David Paul Francis, Mark Tinker, Ian McShane, Craig Cegielski, and Stefanie Berk. In March 2021, after the season had finished airing, Starz announced it had canceled the series.

=== Filming ===
The season was scheduled to film between September 20, 2019, and March 6, 2020. Production began in October 2019 in Toronto.

=== Casting ===
The third season features several new actors in recurring roles. In September 2019, Marilyn Manson and Blythe Danner were cast in recurring roles. In October, Ashley Reyes joined as a series regular, while Herizen Guardiola, Lela Loren, Dominique Jackson, and Eric Johnson joined in recurring roles. In November, Danny Trejo, Julia Sweeney, and Wale joined the guest cast; while in December, Iwan Rheon was added to the cast. It was reported that Crispin Glover would return in a guest role.

The third season also sees several cast changes, including the departure of Pablo Schreiber as Mad Sweeney at the end of the previous season. In December 2019, Orlando Jones stated that he had been fired from the series in September and alleged that new showrunner Charles Eglee decided his character, Mr. Nancy, sends "the wrong message for black America". In response, a spokesperson for the series stated that Jones' contract was not renewed because his character Mr. Nancy is not included in the book material on which the season 3 episodes are based. Also in December, Mousa Kraish announced that he would also not appear in the third season.

On February 1, 2021, Manson was removed from the cast following abuse allegations against him. Manson's scenes from his final episode, "Sister Rising", were removed.

== Release ==
The third season of American Gods premiered in the United States on January 10, 2021, with weekly international distribution beginning from January 11 via Amazon Prime.

== Reception ==
=== Critical response ===
The third season received positive reviews from critics, who called it an improvement over its predecessor. On Rotten Tomatoes, it has a 79% rating with an average score of 6.90 out of 10 based on 19 reviews, with the critical consensus stating, "Though it's unlikely to bring anyone back into the fold, American Gods' tighter focus and strong performances may be enough for fans still holding out hope for a solid finish." On Metacritic, it has a score of 69 out of 100 based on 4 reviews, indicating "generally favorable" reviews.

=== Ratings ===
Viewership and ratings per episode of American Gods season 3
No.	Title	Air date	Rating (18–49)	Viewers (millions)
1	"A Winter's Tale"	January 10, 2021	0.04	0.209
2	"Serious Moonlight"	January 17, 2021	0.05	0.185
3	"Ashes and Demons"	January 24, 2021	0.05	0.160
4	"The Unseen"	January 31, 2021	0.02	0.204
5	"Sister Rising"	February 14, 2021	0.03	0.123
6	"Conscience of the King"	February 21, 2021	0.05	0.197
7	"Fire and Ice"	February 28, 2021	0.03	0.180
8	"The Rapture of Burning"	March 7, 2021	0.02	0.110
9	"The Lake Effect"	March 14, 2021	0.03	0.153
10	"Tears of the Wrath-Bearing Tree"	March 21, 2021	0.03	0.182
