= American Gods season 2 =

Season of television series

American Gods
- Season 2
- Promotional poster
- Showrunner: Jesse Alexander
- Starring: Ricky Whittle; Emily Browning; Crispin Glover; Orlando Jones; Yetide Badaki; Bruce Langley; Mousa Kraish; Omid Abtahi; Demore Barnes; Pablo Schreiber; Ian McShane
- No. of episodes: 8

Release
- Original network: Starz
- Original release: March 10 – April 28, 2019

Season chronology
- ← Previous; Season 1 Next → Season 3

The second season of American Gods, based on Neil Gaiman's novel of the same name, was broadcast on Starz between March 10 and April 28, 2019, and consisted of eight episodes. Jesse Alexander adapted the second season, serving as the sole showrunner after Bryan Fuller and Michael Green departed the series, and production began in April 2018 after the season was officially greenlit in May 2017. The season stars Ricky Whittle, Emily Browning, Crispin Glover, Yetide Badaki, Bruce Langley, Pablo Schreiber and Ian McShane, who all return from the previous season, as well as Orlando Jones, Mousa Kraish, Omid Abtahi and Demore Barnes, who were promoted to series regular status for the second season.

The second season follows Shadow Moon, an ex-convict who is the right-hand man and bodyguard for Mr. Wednesday, an Old God who is in the midst of a war between the Old Gods, the gods from ancient mythology, and the New Gods, the gods of society, technology, and globalization.

== Cast and characters ==
=== Main ===
- Ricky Whittle as Shadow Moon, a former convict who becomes Mr. Wednesday's bodyguard. Gabriel Darku portrays a young Shadow.
- Emily Browning as Laura Moon, Shadow Moon's wife and a revenant.
- Crispin Glover as Mr. World, the New God of globalization and the leader of the New Gods.
- Orlando Jones as Mr. Nancy, the Ghanaian trickster god Anansi. He works as a tailor.
- Yetide Badaki as Bilquis, a goddess of love, identified with the Queen of Sheba.
- Bruce Langley as the Technical Boy / Quantum Boy, the New God of technology.
- Mousa Kraish as the Jinn, a mythic being of fire who, fearing for his safety, considers fleeing the United States.
- Omid Abtahi as Salim, a foreigner who is "one half of a pair of star-crossed lovers".
- Demore Barnes as Mr. Ibis, the keeper of stories past and present, the Egyptian god Thoth.
- Pablo Schreiber as Mad Sweeney, a leprechaun in the employ of Mr. Wednesday who has trouble coming to terms with his lost charm.
- Ian McShane as Mr. Wednesday, a con artist and the god Odin.

=== Recurring ===
- Kahyun Kim as the New Goddess New Media, who is described as, "the goddess of global content and in this age, a cyberspace chameleon, who is also a master of manipulation".
- Peter Stormare as Czernobog, Slavic god of darkness, death and evil who suspects Mr. Wednesday's motives and is reluctant to lend his aid.
- Sakina Jaffrey as Mama-Ji, a waitress at the Motel America and the Hindu goddess of death and liberation, Kali. With her necklace of skulls, acerbic wit and free spirit, she is a match for any mighty god or man. She is present in each Motel America, which serve as meeting places for the gods.
- Andrew Koji as Mr. Xie, the top executive at the Silicon Valley company, Xie Comm. He invented the programs that write the electronic music that gave an increase in vitality, and brought more worshipers to, Technical Boy.

=== Guests ===
- Cloris Leachman as Zorya Vechernyaya, "the Evening Star", the eldest of three sisters who watch the stars to guard against forgotten horrors.
- Dean Winters as Mr. Town, a brutal and efficient agent tasked by the New Gods to find out what Shadow knows about Mr. Wednesday's plan.
- Devery Jacobs as Sam Black Crow, a fierce and confident college student, who travels alone in her dusty pickup truck, giving rides to hitchhikers whom she photographs. She is spiritually cynical for someone who claims to believe in so much.
- Christian Lloyd as Argus Panoptes, an all-seeing Greek giant who has many eyes that allow him to be asleep and awake at the same time. Over time he became the god of surveillance.
- Sana Asad as Bast, a goddess who lives as a cat at Ibis and Jacquel Funeral Parlor.
- William Sanderson as Bookkeeper, a representative of the god of Money.
- Mustafa Shakir as Baron Samedi, the Haitian loa of the dead who owns a bar in New Orleans.
- Hani Furstenberg as Maman Brigitte, Haitian loa of the dead and consort of Baron Samedi.
- Lee Arenberg as Alviss, the King of the Dwarves who is a builder and a forger.
- Jeremy Raymond as Dvalinn, the runemaster of the Dwarves.
- Derek Theler as Donar Odinson, the son of Mr. Wednesday, and as the Norse god of thunder, Thor.
- Laura Bell Bundy as Columbia, the female embodiment of Manifest destiny and the Spirit of America before the Statue of Liberty came and took her fame. Wednesday persuades her to promote the upcoming war.

== Episodes ==
No. overall	No. in season	Title	Directed by	Teleplay by	Original release date	U.S. viewers (millions)
9	1	"House on the Rock"	Christopher J. Byrne	Jesse Alexander & Neil Gaiman	March 10, 2019	0.520
A dozen of the Old Gods reunite at the House on the Rock at Mr. Wednesday's request. Shadow is allowed to enter but Laura and Mad Sweeney are denied. Bilquis arrives uninvited, but is allowed in. Salim reunites with the Jinn, who is working for Wednesday. Meanwhile, Mr. World orders Technical Boy to find Media. At the house, the carousel transports them into the otherworld inside Wednesday's mind, where they debate his war plans. Bilquis says they must embrace the New Gods' tools to increase their followers, but Shadow delivers a speech to convince them to give Wednesday's plans a chance. Later, as they are eating and socializing at the Wisconsin Motel America diner, Mr. World orders an attack on them. Zorya is killed by a sniper and Shadow is captured.
10	2	"The Beguiling Man"	Frederick E.O. Toye	Tyler Dinucci & Andres Fischer-Centeno	March 17, 2019	0.348
Mr. Wednesday vows to avenge Zorya. Mr. Town tortures and interrogates Shadow about Mr. Wednesday's plans, which makes Shadow remember coming to America as a teenager with his mother and how he lost her to cancer. Wednesday sends the Jinn to find his spear, Gungnir, and Salim, in love, accompanies him. Laura and Mad Sweeney pursue Shadow's diminishing light by car, during which Sweeney tells Laura about a Devil, called Baron, in New Orleans who could help her. Mr. World tries to convince Bilquis to side with him. Technical Boy finds Media, who refuses to come out until she is ready. Laura and Mad Sweeney find Shadow on a train, just as Wednesday carries out his plan to derail it.
11	3	"Muninn"	Deborah Chow	Heather Bellson	March 24, 2019	0.329
Laura, dismembered in the train crash, is taken by Wednesday and Sweeney to Mr. Ibis, leaving Shadow in the ruins of the train. Ibis sews Laura back together again, and Wednesday takes her to find Argus, the god of surveillance, to "recharge her coin". Sweeney tells her they should go meet the Baron instead, and to not trust Wednesday, but she ignores his advice. Media reincarnates as New Media, and she and Technical Boy are sent to meet with Argus, whose surveillance has failed the New Gods. New Media attempts to merge with Argus, but they are interrupted by Laura killing Argus on Wednesday's orders. Argus' death reverses part of Laura's rot, and causes her heart to beat briefly. Wednesday implies Argus may come back, and leaves Laura behind, telling her she and Shadow are not connected, and that she is no longer the girl he loved. Meanwhile, Salim and the Jinn obtain Gungnir from Iktomi, who also gives them a tiny sapling. Shadow hitches a ride to Cairo, Illinois with Sam Black Crow, where he arrives at Mr. Ibis' funeral parlor and confronts Wednesday.
12	4	"The Greatest Story Ever Told"	Stacie Passon	Peter Calloway & Aditi Brennan Kapil	March 31, 2019	0.336
Shadow and Wednesday leave for St. Louis, to meet with Money, who Wednesday claims is the most powerful god in America. Bilquis, shaken up by Zorya's death, arrives in Cairo, to speak with Mr. Ibis and Anansi. Anansi is infuriated by Ibis' and Bilquis' attempt at neutrality in the war, and says the African gods must stick together and fight, because no one else will fight for them; he apparently convinces Bilquis. Mr. World summons New Media and Technical Boy and tortures the latter for letting Argus die. Technical Boy promises Mr. World a replacement for Argus and goes to meet Mr. Xie, the CEO of a technology company, whose electronic music brought him power in the past. He fails to impress Xie, who instead chooses Mr. World and New Media. Technical Boy attempts to flee, but is captured and "retired" by Mr. World. Money appears before Wednesday and Mr. World and declares that he will not take a side in the war.
13	5	"The Ways of the Dead"	Salli Richardson-Whitfield	Rodney Barnes	April 7, 2019	0.306
Laura arrives in New Orleans, and meets up with Sweeney, who introduces her to Baron Samedi and Maman Brigitte, two loa he claims can bring her back to life. Samedi gives Laura a potion but, for it to work it must be mixed with "the blood of true love". After a confusing night, Laura leaves Sweeney, believing that Wednesday is manipulating her through him. From the sapling sent by Iktomi, Wednesday plants a new Yggdrasil in Cairo, then leaves to retrieve Gungnir from the Jinn and Salim. Wednesday asks Alvíss, King of the Dwarves, to repair Gungnir, but Alvíss says it is the runes on the spear that must be repaired. Shadow learns about Froggie James, a black man who was lynched in Cairo many years before, and who still haunts the town – furious at his own people who did not come to his aid when he needed them. Anansi suspects that Ibis and Jacquel remain neutral because Froggie's curse ensures them a constant stream of dead bodies, so they do not need a new war. In an attempt to free the people of the curse, Shadow allows Froggie to tell his story by speaking through him at Lila's funeral.
14	6	"Donar the Great"	Rachel Talalay	Adria Lang	April 14, 2019	0.240
Shadow and Wednesday go to a once-popular mall that was built over the dwarves' American center of power. The dwarves are too weak now to reawaken the runes. They request the most powerful artifact in the mall: Lou Reed's signed leather jacket, currently in a memorabilia store. Shadow and Wednesday pull a con called the Bishop Game and succeed in swindling the jacket, which they lay on Dvalinn the runemaster's shoulders. The power flows through the dwarf into the spear, and he crafts the runes on Gungnir. Mr. World senses the runes have been etched and states that things are happening ahead of schedule. Flashbacks tell the story of Wednesday's son, Donar the Great, Thor's stage name, who performed in Mr. Nancy and Wednesday's burlesque shows in the early 1900s with Columbia. American Nazis are impressed by Donar and want to sponsor him for strong man competitions. Eventually they demand that Donar throw a match against a German opponent, but Donar refuses. Donar and Columbia want to run away to California, but Wednesday schemes to break them up. Donar and Wednesday fight and Donar breaks Odin's spear with his hammer, Mjölnir. Donar leaves and Wednesday reveals to Shadow that he went on to commit the only type of death gods cannot come back from, suicide.
15	7	"Treasure of the Sun"	Paco Cabezas	Heather Bellson	April 21, 2019	0.318
Sweeney arrives in Cairo, and is greeted by banshees; he knows this means someone in the house will die. The others do not believe him, and think they are only humans there for a funeral. Wednesday repairs Gungnir with a branch from the new Yggdrasil tree and orders Shadow to guard the spear. Sweeney is falling apart physically, going mad again and remembering his origins, but his memories are confused. He recalls living wild and mad, a wife and daughter that he lost, a curse that was put on him by the monks, and a prophecy that he will die by a spear. Ibis tells him "stories are truer than the truth" and implies Sweeney is also the old god Lugh, who slew his one-eyed grandfather, Balor. Sweeney sees himself killing Wednesday, instead, and denies being Lugh. Sweeney reveals to the household that the food everyone has been eating was left by the banshees, who are fairies like himself, and that eating a fairy's food puts you in their debt. Sweeney says Wednesday is now in his debt. Sweeney attempts to kill Wednesday with Gungnir, but Shadow grabs the spear and Sweeney falls upon it. Sweeney magics Gungnir into the Otherworld hoard where he keeps his coins, so Wednesday can never reach it.
16	8	"Moon Shadow"	Christopher J. Byrne	Aditi Brennan Kapil & Jim Danger Gray	April 28, 2019	0.272
As Wednesday leaves the funeral home all alone, Laura reunites with Shadow. Despite her attempt to apologize for everything, Shadow brushes her off before telling her that Sweeney died, prompting Laura to decide to kill Wednesday. Meanwhile, Xie is able to help Technical Boy to rebirth as Quantum Boy, who uploads massive digital information to Mr. World and New Media. The latter starts manipulating the media to falsely accuse Shadow, Wednesday and Salim of being terrorists, creating general chaos and fear. As the police come to arrest them at the funeral home, Shadow tries to escape but he is absorbed by Yggdrasil. He learns that Wednesday is his father, making him a demi-god; he unwittingly uses his powers to cancel New Media's manipulations, making the news crews and police disappear. The Jinn leaves with Salim to protect him. Laura walks away with Sweeney's body over her shoulder. Shadow heads north on a bus, alone; when stopped by police, he pulls out his I.D. and is surprised to find he has a new identity.

== Production ==
=== Development ===
On May 10, 2017, the series was renewed for a second season. On November 29, 2017, it was announced that Fuller and Green were departing the show and were to be replaced as showrunners for season two after having completed writing roughly half of the season's scripts. On January 12, 2018, Starz President and CEO Chris Albrecht clarified the ongoing struggle with mounting a second season, including Gillian Anderson's and Kristin Chenoweth's involvement, Fuller and Green's continued involvement – stressing that they were never fired, nor did they quit – given their schedules, and showrunner and budget concerns, while stressing the difficulty of adaptation and the network and Fremantle Media's continued commitment to the series. On February 2, 2018, Jesse Alexander, writer for Fuller's Hannibal and Star Trek: Discovery, was announced as co-showrunner for the second season alongside Gaiman.

In September 2018, it was reported that Alexander had been removed as showrunner from the series by Starz and Fremantle. The series was also six weeks behind schedule and was forced to go on hiatus due to having an unfinished script for the season finale; Alexander submitted multiple drafts for the finale, but they were all rejected. Fuller and Green had scripted the first six episodes of season two, but they were thrown out once Alexander was hired to rewrite them. The season two episode order was trimmed from ten to eight episodes, similar to season one, in an attempt to trim the budget. The first season was $30 million over budget. Cast members were unhappy with the new scripts and they were often rewritten on set, including Ian McShane improvising dialogue. Starz was unhappy with Alexander's direction of the material, which was more "conventional", different from Fuller and Green's more "atmospheric, hypnotic" tone. With no showrunner, producing director Chris Byrne and line producer Lisa Kussner were left in charge.

=== Filming ===
Production began on the second season in April 2018, and with the season premiering on March 10, 2019.

=== Writing ===
During an interview with Neil Gaiman on June 24, 2016, he discussed plans for future seasons of the show beyond the first, should it be continued, and noting that the first season only covers the first third of the novel. The second season was intended to cover the Lakeside section of the novel, and "a big pivotal thing that happens to Mr. Wednesday" was likely to be a season finale for either the second or third season. However, the Lakeside arc was later pushed back to a potential third season.

=== Casting ===
On June 4, 2018, it was announced that Dean Winters, Devery Jacobs and Kahyun Kim would join the cast in the second season as Mr. Town, Sam Black Crow and Media; with the latter now known as New Media after the departure of Gillian Anderson in the role. It was also confirmed that Kristin Chenoweth would not be making an appearance in the season due to scheduling conflicts.

== Reception ==
=== Critical response ===
The second season has received mixed reviews from critics. On Rotten Tomatoes, it has a 61% rating with an average score of 6.05 out of 10 based on 106 reviews with the consensus stating: "American Gods retains its bombastic style but loses its divine inspiration in a derivative second season that, after a change in show-runners and even some crucial cast members, feels like a false idol." On Metacritic, it has a score of 47 out of 100 based on 9 reviews, indicating "mixed or average" reviews. Alan Sepinwall of Rolling Stone gave it 2 out of 5 stars, calling it "aimless" and despite having a "talented cast", Sepinwall ultimately felt "the whole thing is hollow and dull."

=== Ratings ===
Viewership and ratings per episode of American Gods season 2
No.	Title	Air date	Rating (18–49)	Viewers (millions)	DVR viewers (millions)	Total viewers (millions)
1	"House on the Rock"	March 10, 2019	0.2	0.520	0.202	0.722 (Note: Live +7 ratings were not available, so Live +3 ratings have been used instead.)
2	"The Beguiling Man"	March 17, 2019	0.1	0.348	0.412	0.760
3	"Muninn"	March 24, 2019	0.1	0.329	0.412	0.742
4	"The Greatest Story Ever Told"	March 31, 2019	0.1	0.336	0.436	0.772
5	"The Ways of the Dead"	April 7, 2019	0.1	0.306	0.354	0.660
6	"Donar the Great"	April 14, 2019	0.1	0.240	0.434	0.674
7	"Treasure of the Sun"	April 21, 2019	0.1	0.318	0.321	0.639
8	"Moon Shadow"	April 28, 2019	0.1	0.272	0.354	0.626
