= American Gods season 1 =

Season of television series

American Gods
- Season 1
- Home media cover art
- Showrunners: Bryan Fuller; Michael Green
- Starring: Ricky Whittle; Emily Browning; Crispin Glover; Bruce Langley; Yetide Badaki; Pablo Schreiber; Ian McShane
- No. of episodes: 8

Release
- Original network: Starz
- Original release: April 30 – June 18, 2017

Season chronology
- Next → Season 2

The first season of American Gods, based on Neil Gaiman's novel of the same name, was broadcast on Starz between April 30, 2017, and June 18, 2017, and consisted of eight episodes. Bryan Fuller and Michael Green adapted the first season, serving as showrunners, and production began in March 2016 after the series was officially greenlit in March 2015. The season stars Ricky Whittle, Emily Browning, Crispin Glover, Bruce Langley, Yetide Badaki, Pablo Schreiber and Ian McShane.

The season follows Shadow Moon after he's released from prison following the death of his wife, when he meets Mr. Wednesday, an Old God who is in the midst of a war between the Old Gods, the gods from ancient mythology, and the New Gods, the gods of society, technology, and globalization. The season received positive reviews from critics.

== Cast and characters ==
=== Main ===
- Ricky Whittle as Shadow Moon, a former convict who becomes Mr. Wednesday's bodyguard.
- Emily Browning as Laura Moon, Shadow Moon's wife and a revenant. Browning also portrays Essie MacGowan, the Irish woman whose belief in leprechauns changes the course of her life.
- Crispin Glover as Mr. World, the New God of globalization and the leader of the New Gods.
- Bruce Langley as the Technical Boy, the New God of technology.
- Yetide Badaki as Bilquis, a goddess of love, identified with the Queen of Sheba.
- Pablo Schreiber as Mad Sweeney, a leprechaun in the employ of Mr. Wednesday who has trouble coming to terms with his lost charm.
- Ian McShane as Mr. Wednesday, a con artist and the god Odin.

=== Recurring ===
- Gillian Anderson as the New Goddess Media, the public face and "mouthpiece" of the New Gods. She appears in the form of famous personalities, including Lucy Ricardo, Marilyn Monroe, David Bowie and Judy Garland. After Anderson's departure from the series, for the second season the role was redefined and renamed as New Media, played by South Korean actress Kahyun Kim (see below).
- Cloris Leachman as Zorya Vechernyaya, "the Evening Star", the eldest of three sisters who watch the stars to guard against forgotten horrors.
- Peter Stormare as Czernobog, Slavic god of darkness, death and evil who suspects Mr. Wednesday's motives and is reluctant to lend his aid.
- Chris Obi as Mr. Jacquel, the Egyptian God of the dead, Anubis.
- Mousa Kraish as the Jinn, a mythic being of fire who, fearing for his safety, considers fleeing the United States.
- Omid Abtahi as Salim, a foreigner who is "one half of a pair of star-crossed lovers". He has a sexual encounter with the Jinn, disguised then as a cab driver.
- Orlando Jones as Mr. Nancy, the Ghanaian trickster god Anansi. He works as a tailor.
- Demore Barnes as Mr. Ibis, the keeper of stories past and present, the Egyptian god Thoth.
- Betty Gilpin as Audrey, Robbie's wife and Laura's best friend.
- Beth Grant as Jack, the owner of the bar where Shadow meets Mr. Wednesday.

=== Guests ===
- Jonathan Tucker as Low Key Lyesmith, a friend of Shadow from prison.
- Martha Kelly as Zorya Utrennyaya, "the Morning Star", the middle silent sister of the Zorya.
- Erika Kaar as Zorya Polunochnaya, "the Midnight Star", the youngest of the Zorya sisters who sleeps during the day and only appears late at night. She guides Shadow and sets him on his path.
- Dane Cook as Robbie, Shadow's best friend.
- Kristin Chenoweth as Easter, Germanic goddess of the dawn.
- Corbin Bernsen as Vulcan, who has renewed himself by binding himself to guns and those who worship them.
- Jeremy Davies as Jesus Prime, one of many versions to appear at the home of Easter.
- Conphidance as Okoye, a scarred slave who leads a revolt.

== Episodes ==
No. overall	No. in season	Title	Directed by	Teleplay by	Original release date	U.S. viewers (millions)
1	1	"The Bone Orchard"	David Slade	Bryan Fuller & Michael Green	April 30, 2017	0.975
In 813 A.D., a Viking ship reaches the shores of North America, where unseen indigenous people force the passengers to retreat by firing a barrage of arrows. The Vikings make several blood sacrifices to Odin; eventually they find a wind enabling them to sail home. In the present, Shadow Moon is released a few days early from prison after his wife Laura dies in a car accident. On the flight home, Shadow meets Wednesday, who offers him a job as a bodyguard. After he lands, Shadow stops at a bar, where he again meets Wednesday. Shadow learns that his best friend Robbie died in the same car accident as his wife. Mad Sweeney introduces himself to Shadow as a leprechaun, and goads him into a fight. Shadow wins and earns a gold coin. Shadow attends Laura's funeral and learns of her affair with Robbie. After the burial, he flips the coin onto her grave. Unbeknownst to him, it mysteriously sinks into the dirt. Leaving the graveyard, Shadow is abducted by the Technical Boy, who demands to know about Wednesday. Technical Boy orders his men to kill Shadow and they attempt to lynch him. The noose snaps, freeing Shadow, while his attackers are killed by an unknown assailant.
2	2	"The Secret of Spoons"	David Slade	Michael Green & Bryan Fuller	May 7, 2017	0.710
In 1697, on a slave ship, an African man who has been enslaved and transported in chains begins to pray, in desperation, to the god Anansi. The Old God appears before him in human form and tells of the terrible fate that awaits him in America. At Anansi's urging, the enslaved Africans riot, free themselves, and burn the ship to the waterline, killing everyone but Anansi, who escapes the ship in the form of a spider and arrives onshore amid the wreckage. In the present, Bilquis devours more lovers. Meanwhile, Shadow confronts Wednesday about the attack from Technical Boy, but Wednesday convinces him to continue working for him. While shopping in a big-box store, Shadow meets the New God Media, who takes the form of Lucy Ricardo to convince Shadow to align with her. After refusing, Shadow and Wednesday travel to Chicago. They go to an apartment belonging to three sisters and a slaughterhouse worker named Czernobog, who dislikes Wednesday. After dinner, Czernobog plays checkers with Shadow on a bet: if Shadow wins, Czernobog will go with them, but if Shadow loses, Czernobog will smash his head. Shadow loses.
3	3	"Head Full of Snow"	David Slade	Bryan Fuller & Michael Green	May 14, 2017	0.716
In Queens, New York, Anubis comes for the soul of an elderly Muslim woman. He removes her heart and weighs it against a feather to determine if she was a good or bad person. She is found worthy and Anubis sends her to the afterlife. Back in Chicago, Shadow dreams of Zorya Polunochnaya, youngest of the Zorya, who pulls the Moon from the sky and gives it to him in the form of a silver dollar. Waking, Shadow challenges Czernobog to another game of checkers and wins, forcing Czernobog to agree to go to Wisconsin. In New York City, an Omani businessman named Salim meets a taxi driver, who is revealed to be an Ifrit. The two have a sexual encounter, and the following morning, they have exchanged lives. Elsewhere, Shadow is confronted by Mad Sweeney, who demands that Shadow return the gold coin Sweeney mistakenly gave him. Shadow tells him he threw it on Laura's grave. Mad Sweeney exhumes Laura's coffin, finding her and the coin gone. Shadow assists Wednesday in conning a bank's business depositors and by "thinking of snow," which causes a snowstorm. When he returns to his hotel room, Laura is waiting for him.
4	4	"Git Gone"	Craig Zobel	Michael Green & Bryan Fuller	May 21, 2017	0.631
In a flashback, Laura's earlier life is revealed. She attempts suicide, but fails. She meets Shadow when she stops him from using card tricks to steal from the casino where she works. Shadow quickly falls in love with Laura and they marry, but Laura still finds life meaningless. She convinces Shadow to help her rob the casino, but Shadow is caught and sent to prison. Laura promises to wait for him, but has an affair with his boss and friend Robbie. On the eve of Shadow's release, Laura and Robbie die in a car accident. Laura awakens in the desert with Anubis, but before he can send her to the afterlife, she is whisked back to her body. Possessing superhuman strength, she sees a brilliant light in the distance, discovers it's Shadow, and rescues him without revealing herself. She later feels compelled to pursue him, even as her physical form begins to deteriorate. She is discovered by two Old Gods, Mr. Ibis and Mr. Jacquel, who restore her damaged body. Jacquel reveals himself as Anubis and vows to reclaim Laura's soul when her mission is done. Laura continues toward Shadow, eventually meeting him in his hotel room.
5	5	"Lemon Scented You"	Vincenzo Natali	David Graziano	May 28, 2017	0.666
During the last ice age, a tribe of people travel across Beringia, with a symbol of their god, Nynyunnini. As in episode one, the Beringians encounter people and gods already indigenous to the North American landbase, who forcibly deny them entry. The Beringian tribe begins to lose faith. Nynyunnini dies and is forgotten. In the present, Media (in the form of David Bowie) confronts Technical Boy on behalf of Mr. World, the New God of Globalization, scolding him for his attempted lynching of Shadow. Shadow and Wednesday are arrested for bank robbery. Mad Sweeney tries to retrieve his coin from Laura but discovers that it is inside her, giving her life. He warns her not to trust Wednesday. In the jail, Media (now in the form of Marilyn Monroe) and Mr. World force Technical Boy to apologize. The New Gods offer an alliance with Wednesday, promising to help him "find his audience" by sending a missile named Odin to attack North Korea. They murder the police and allow Shadow and Wednesday to escape.
6	6	"A Murder of Gods"	Adam Kane	Seamus Kevin Fahey and Michael Green & Bryan Fuller	June 4, 2017	0.607
A group of Mexican illegal immigrants attempting to cross the border into the U.S. pray to Jesus, who walks to them across the river and attempts to protect them. Jesus is shot dead by a group of vigilantes, the bullets marking his body like stigmata. Shadow questions what he saw at the police station and admits to Wednesday that Laura is back from the dead. Sweeney teams up with Laura, seeking her resurrection so he can reclaim his coin. They meet Salim, who agrees to drive them across state lines in his taxi in exchange for Sweeney helping him find the Jinn. In Virginia, Wednesday takes Shadow to meet the Old God Vulcan, who maintains control over a small town through their belief in the right to bear arms. Vulcan agrees to stand with Wednesday and forges him a sword, but he later betrays them by telling the New Gods where they are. In revenge, Wednesday kills him and curses his believers.
7	7	"A Prayer for Mad Sweeney"	Adam Kane	Maria Melnik	June 11, 2017	0.629
Ibis tells the story of Essie, an Irish girl sentenced to transportation who used to leave offerings to the leprechauns in exchange for good luck. On the ship to America, she seduces the ship captain and persuades him to take her to London. There she becomes a thief; but she is caught after forgetting an offering. Pregnant and transported to America again, she marries her master who, upon his death, leaves her in charge of his farm. She resumes making offerings to the leprechauns. Mad Sweeney visits Essie on her deathbed, thanking her, as her belief enabled him to start a new life in America. As Sweeney and Laura are driving, he tells her that he is taking part in Wednesday's war to atone for deserting as a soldier. The truck overturns and Sweeney's lucky coin falls out of Laura. He restores it to her instead of claiming it, revealing that he had something to do with her fatal car crash.
8	8	"Come to Jesus"	Floria Sigismondi	Bekah Brunstetter and Michael Green & Bryan Fuller	June 18, 2017	0.774
Mr. Nancy tells Shadow and Wednesday the story of Bilquis, a powerful but fallen Old Goddess, which convinces Wednesday to seek out a queen. He and Shadow visit Ostara, an Old Goddess of spring and resurrection who has successfully adapted to the new era by capitalizing on the Christian celebration of Christ's resurrection. Laura and Mad Sweeney track Shadow to Easter's estate. Easter discovers that Laura can't be resurrected because she was killed by a god, forcing Sweeney to admit that Wednesday arranged both Laura's death and Shadow's imprisonment in order to isolate Shadow for his own purposes. Media, Technical Boy, and Mr. World arrive to threaten Wednesday. Wednesday destroys their men with a lightning bolt and proclaims himself to be Odin, and convinces Easter to unleash her own powers and take back the spring, casting a drought over America. At last, Shadow admits belief in the gods, just before Laura arrives to talk with him.

== Production ==
=== Development ===
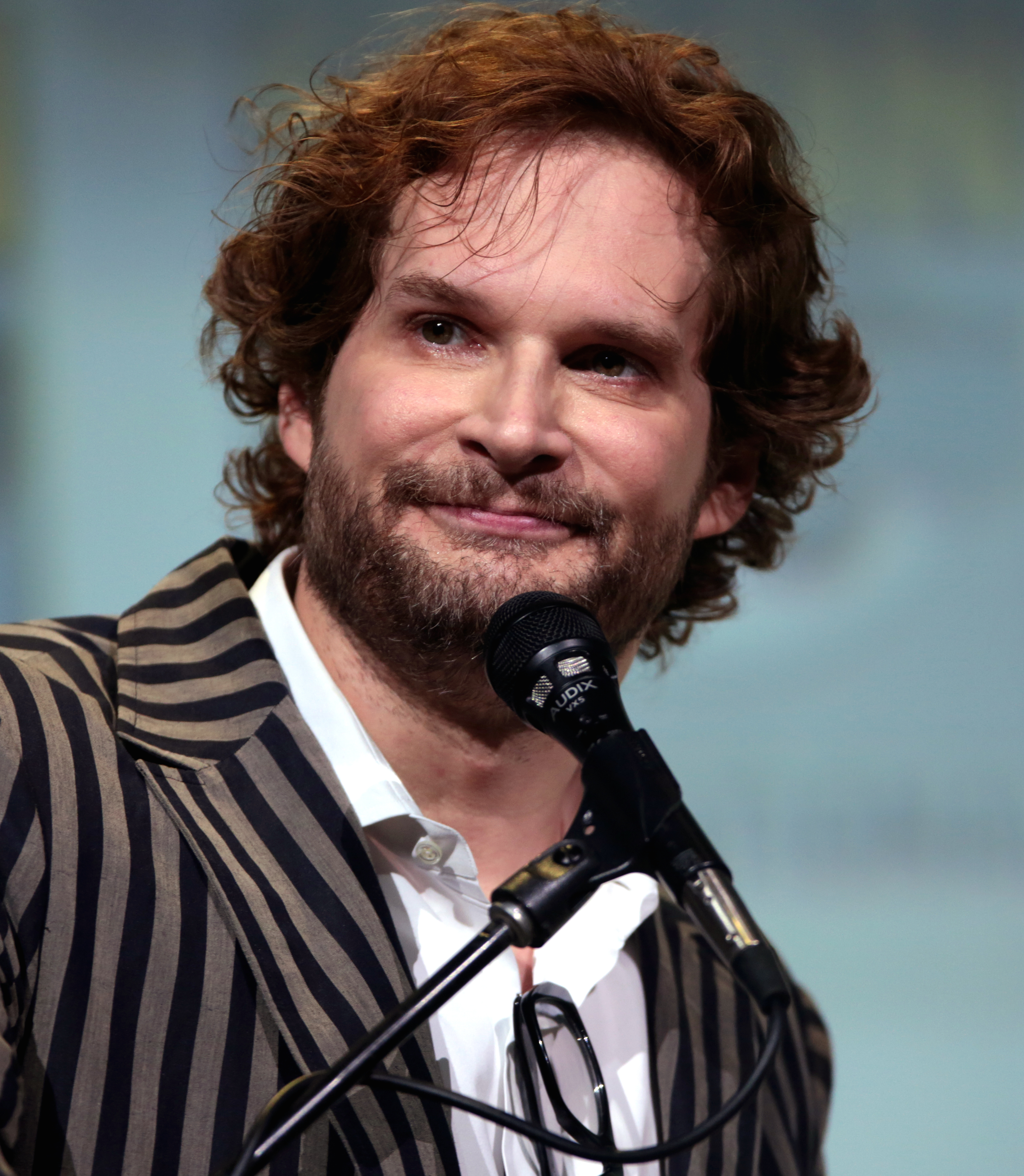
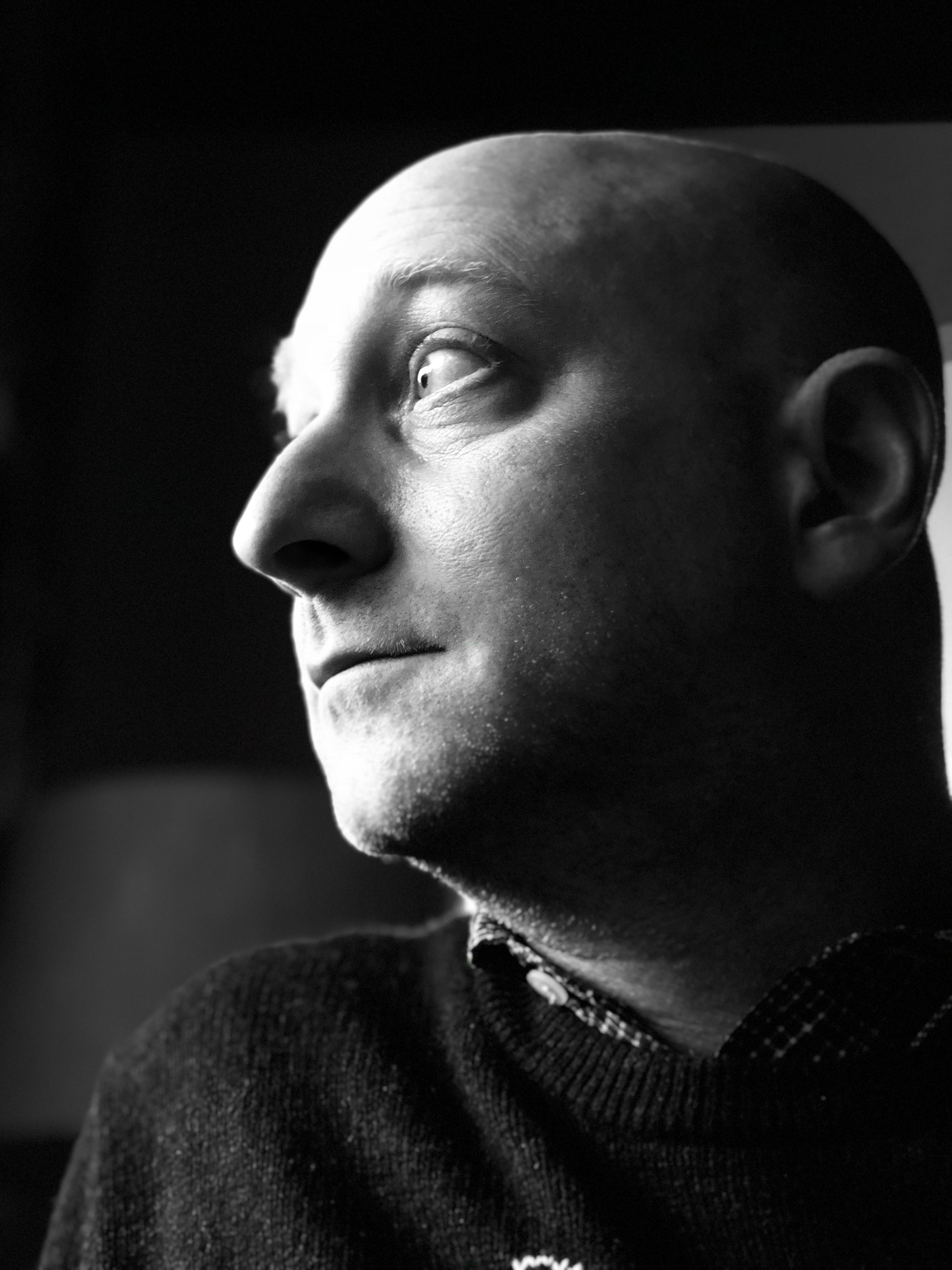
The first season was adapted by Bryan Fuller (left) and Michael Green (right)

In February 2014, Fremantle Media acquired the rights to adapt the novel as a fantasy drama series. In July 2014, it was announced that Starz would be developing the series with Bryan Fuller and Michael Green. Fuller stated that the series would be "[following] the events of the books but expanding those events, and expanding the point of view to go above and beyond Shadow and Wednesday". Permission has been given for the series to incorporate elements from the book's companion, Anansi Boys. Fuller also confirmed that Gaiman is "very involved" with the production and expressed his hope that Gaiman would write an episode himself.

On June 16, 2015, Starz officially announced that it had greenlit the series. Showrunner Bryan Fuller estimated in May 2015 that the show would likely air in "late 2016"; however, it premiered in April 2017, and the first season consisted of eight episodes. The first season was initially set to consist of ten episodes.

=== Filming ===
Production began in March 2016, with filming primarily occurring in Toronto, as well as Brantford, Cambridge, Guelph, and Hamilton, Ontario, and Oklahoma.

=== Writing ===
Regarding the sexual content on the show, Green stated that while the book contains sexual content, "our sexual content, when it was portrayed, was artful. By that, we mean that it was essential to character, or essential to story. That it was as beautiful [as] anything else we were gonna try to portray in the show. Which is to say, if you're going to define gratuitous sexuality as sexuality that can be cut out and not diminish the final episode in any way, we weren't gonna do that. We wanted it to be something that was essential." He also added that Starz wasn't "shy about nudity".

The third episode features a gay scene between a businessman named Salim and a Djinn. Fuller admitted he wasn't concerned with the explicit sexual content that was featured in the scene, stating: "We wanted to tell a very graphic story with the sex and sexuality. And also tell a tale where a man comes from a country where homosexuality is punishable by death. For him most sexual experiences [would be] back-alley blowjobs, so the Jinn is making love to him probably for the first time in his life so he can experience sexual love. It's an amazing, beautiful experience for a human being to have particularly when you consider how many men, women and genders in-between, don't, or can't, because of where they come from." Omid Abtahi, who portrays Salim, commented on the relationship, "I think love in any form, man/man, woman/man, woman/woman, whatever, is a beautiful thing. I would love to live in a world where people are not thrown off by that. So the way you do it is by exposing them to it, and normalizing it. Yes, it might be a little graphic for some people but it's natural. There's no hate. We're not trying to offend anybody. It's love." Fuller also demanded a reshoot of the scene, claiming the original sex positions weren't physiologically possible for anal intercourse.

The fifth episode's prologue showed a five-minute animation sequence that revolves around characters in the Ice Age. The sequence was created by Tendril, a design and animation studio that was based near Toronto, where the series is filmed. According to Tendril's director Chris Bahry, the sequence was difficult to make and it took six months to complete. According to Bahry, "The challenge was in finding the most powerful way to communicate the central theme of the sequence: faith vs survival and adaptation." He also added, "We wanted it to feel very tangible and real, like a stop motion film that could have been made by these ancient people, using whatever materials and tools they would have had access to."

=== Casting ===
On January 28, 2016, Ricky Whittle was cast as the lead character, Shadow Moon. On March 2, 2016, it was announced that Ian McShane had been cast as Mr. Wednesday. It was later announced on March 17, 2016, that Emily Browning would play Laura Moon, Shadow's wife. On March 23, 2016, it was announced that Sean Harris, Yetide Badaki and Bruce Langley would play the respective roles of Mad Sweeney, Bilquis and Technical Boy. On April 14, 2016, Jonathan Tucker and Crispin Glover were cast as Low Key Lyesmith and Mr. World. On April 21, 2016, Cloris Leachman was cast as Zorya Vechernyaya, Peter Stormare as Czernobog, Chris Obi as Mr. Jaquel, and Mousa Kraish as the Jinn.

On May 6, 2016, it was announced that Sean Harris had departed the series for personal reasons and the role of Mad Sweeney was being recast. On May 11, 2016, it was announced that Pablo Schreiber would take over the role of Mad Sweeney. In June 2016, it was announced that Gillian Anderson would portray Media. On June 15, 2016, it was announced that Omid Abtahi, Orlando Jones and Demore Barnes would join the cast as Salim, Mr. Nancy and Mr. Ibis, respectively. On July 15, 2016, it was announced that Dane Cook was set to appear as Robbie, and a week later, Kristin Chenoweth as Easter.

== Reception ==
=== Critical response ===
The first season of American Gods has received largely positive reviews from critics. On Rotten Tomatoes, it has a 92% rating with an average score of 8.15 out of 10 based on 272 reviews with the consensus stating: "American Gods opens with a series of wildly ambitious gambits – and rewards viewers' faith with a promising first season whose visual riches are matched by its narrative impact." On Metacritic, it has a score of 77 out of 100 based on 36 reviews, indicating "generally favorable" reviews. Matt Zoller Seitz, writing for New York Magazine, called the show "a bizarre, dazzling show."

=== Ratings ===
Viewership and ratings per episode of American Gods season 1
No.	Title	Air date	Rating (18–49)	Viewers (millions)	DVR (18–49)	DVR viewers (millions)	Total (18–49)	Total viewers (millions)
1	"The Bone Orchard"	April 30, 2017	0.4	0.975	—N/a	—N/a	—N/a	—N/a
2	"The Secret of Spoons"	May 7, 2017	0.3	0.710	—N/a	—N/a	—N/a	—N/a
3	"Head Full of Snow"	May 14, 2017	0.3	0.716	—N/a	0.585	—N/a	1.301
4	"Git Gone"	May 21, 2017	0.3	0.631	—N/a	0.621	—N/a	1.252
5	"Lemon Scented You"	May 28, 2017	0.3	0.666	0.3	0.733	0.6	1.400
6	"A Murder of Gods"	June 4, 2017	0.2	0.607	0.3	0.671	0.5	1.278
7	"A Prayer for Mad Sweeney"	June 11, 2017	0.3	0.629	—N/a	0.588	—N/a	1.218
8	"Come to Jesus"	June 18, 2017	0.3	0.774	—N/a	0.622	—N/a	1.396

== Home media ==
The first season of American Gods was released on DVD and Blu-ray in Region 4 on July 19, 2017, and in Region 2 on July 31, 2017. The season was released in Region 1 on October 17, 2017, including over two hours of exclusive extras.
