= Come to Jesus =

Come to Jesus may refer to:

- "Come to Jesus" (American Gods), a television episode
- Come to Jesus, a religious tract by Christopher Newman Hall
