= American Gods (TV series) =

American television series (2017–2021)

- Genre: Fantasy drama; Science fiction
- Based on: American Gods by Neil Gaiman
- Developed by: Bryan Fuller; Michael Green
- Showrunners: Bryan Fuller (season 1); Michael Green (season 1); Jesse Alexander (season 2); Charles H. Eglee (season 3)
- Starring: Ricky Whittle; Emily Browning; Crispin Glover; Bruce Langley; Yetide Badaki; Pablo Schreiber; Ian McShane; Orlando Jones; Mousa Kraish; Omid Abtahi; Demore Barnes; Ashley Reyes
- Composers: Brian Reitzell; Danny Bensi; Saunder Jurriaans; Andrew Lockington
- Country of origin: United States
- Original language: English
- No. of seasons: 3
- No. of episodes: 26

Production
- Executive producers: Bryan Fuller; Michael Green; Neil Gaiman; David Slade; Stefanie Berk; Craig Cegielski; Adam Kane; Christopher J. Byrne; Scott Hornbacher; Ian McShane; Padraic McKinley; Jesse Alexander; Charles H. Eglee; Anne Kenney; Damian Kindler; David Paul Francis; Mark Tinker
- Production locations: Toronto; Oklahoma
- Running time: 52–63 minutes
- Production companies: Living Dead Guy; J.A. Green Construction Corp.; The Blank Corporation; Fremantle North America; Starz Originals; United Bongo Drums

Original release
- Network: Starz
- Release: April 30, 2017 – March 21, 2021

American Gods is an American fantasy drama television series based on Neil Gaiman's 2001 novel and developed by Bryan Fuller and Michael Green for the premium cable network Starz. Produced by Fremantle North America and distributed by Lionsgate Television, the first season premiered on April 30, 2017. Fuller and Green served as the showrunners for the first season and were replaced by Jesse Alexander for the second season. Charles H. Eglee served as showrunner for the third season. Gaiman served as an executive producer.

Ricky Whittle plays the series' lead Shadow Moon, who meets a strange man named Mr. Wednesday (Ian McShane) after being released from prison and soon becomes embroiled in a large-scale conflict between the Old Gods and the New Gods, who grow stronger each day. In May 2017, the series was renewed for a second season, which premiered on March 10, 2019. The following week, Starz renewed American Gods for the third season, which premiered on January 10, 2021. In March 2021, the series was canceled after three seasons.

The series, mainly the first season, received praise for its visual style and acting and received two nominations at the 69th Primetime Emmy Awards for Outstanding Main Title Design and Outstanding Special Visual Effects. It also received three nominations at the 8th Critics' Choice Television Awards, including Best Drama Series, Best Actor in a Drama Series for McShane, and Best Supporting Actress in a Drama Series for Gillian Anderson.

== Premise ==
Only days before his scheduled release from prison, Shadow Moon is told that his wife has been killed in a car accident, and he is released early to attend the funeral. A series of events delay his trip home, during which time he meets the mysterious Mr. Wednesday. Wednesday repeatedly offers Shadow a job, which he refuses until Wednesday reveals that the job waiting for him at home no longer exists. Shadow accepts the offer to become Wednesday's minder (driver/assistant/bodyguard).

Shadow finds himself in a hidden world where magic is real and a collection of "Old Gods" fear irrelevance in the face of the growing power of a collection of "New Gods", which include Technology and Media. In a grand plan to combat this deadly threat, Mr. Wednesday attempts to unite the Old Gods to defend their existence and rebuild the influence they have lost, leaving Shadow struggling to accept this new world and his place in it.

== Cast and characters ==
=== Main ===
- Ricky Whittle as Shadow Moon, a former convict who becomes Mr. Wednesday's bodyguard.
- Emily Browning as Laura Moon, Shadow Moon's wife and a revenant.
  Browning also portrays Essie MacGowan, an Irish woman whose belief in leprechauns changes the course of her life.
- Crispin Glover as Mr. World, (Note: During season 3, credited as main cast only when appearing in the episode.) the New God of Globalization and the leader of the New Gods.
- Bruce Langley as the Technical Boy/Quantum Boy, the New God of Technology.
- Yetide Badaki as Bilquis, a goddess of love identified with the Queen of Sheba.
- Pablo Schreiber as Mad Sweeney (seasons 1–2), a leprechaun in the employ of Mr. Wednesday; he has trouble coming to terms with losing his charm.
- Ian McShane as Mr. Wednesday, a con artist and the god Odin.
- Orlando Jones as Mr. Nancy (main season 2; recurring season 1), the Ghanaian trickster god Anansi. He works as a tailor.
- Mousa Kraish as the Jinn (main season 2; recurring season 1), a mythic being of fire who, fearing for his safety, considers fleeing the United States.
- Omid Abtahi as Salim (main seasons 2–3; recurring season 1), an Omani migrant who is "one half of a pair of star-crossed lovers", looking for a Djinn with whom he had a sexual encounter.
- Demore Barnes as Mr. Ibis (main seasons 2–3; recurring season 1), the keeper of stories past and present, the Egyptian god Thoth.
- Ashley Reyes as Cordelia (season 3), a rebellious and tech-savvy college dropout who works for Mr. Wednesday as his new driver.

=== Recurring ===
- Gillian Anderson as the Goddess Media (season 1), the public face and "mouthpiece" of the New Gods. She appears in the form of famous personalities, including Lucille Ball, Marilyn Monroe, David Bowie, and Judy Garland. Anderson left the series, so the role was redefined and renamed as New Media for the second season.
- Cloris Leachman as Zorya Vechernyaya (seasons 1–2), the Evening Star, the eldest of three sisters who watch the stars to guard against forgotten horrors.
- Peter Stormare as Czernobog, Slavic god of darkness, death, and evil who suspects Mr. Wednesday's motives and is reluctant to lend his aid.
- Chris Obi as Mr. Jacquel (season 1), the Egyptian god of the dead, Anubis.
- Betty Gilpin as Audrey (season 1), Robbie's wife and Laura's best friend.
- Beth Grant as Jack (season 1), the owner of the bar where Mr. Wednesday hires Shadow.
- Kahyun Kim as the New Goddess New Media (season 2), who is described as, "the goddess of global content and in this age, a cyberspace chameleon, who is also a master of manipulation".
- Sakina Jaffrey as Mama-Ji (season 2), a waitress at the Motel America and the Hindu goddess of death and liberation, Kali. With her necklace of skulls, acerbic wit and free spirit, she is a match for any mighty god or man.
- Dominique Jackson as Ms. World (season 3), an incarnation of Mr. World.
- Blythe Danner as Demeter (season 3), Greek goddess of agriculture, harvest and fertility. Demeter has an unresolved romantic history with Wednesday.
- Iwan Rheon as Liam Doyle (season 3), a leprechaun bartender Laura meets while on her quest for revenge against Wednesday.

=== Notable guests ===
- Jonathan Tucker as Low Key Lyesmith (season 1), a friend of Shadow from prison.
- Martha Kelly as Zorya Utrennyaya (season 1, 3), the Morning Star, the middle silent sister of the Zorya.
- Erika Kaar as Zorya Polunochnaya (season 1, 3), the Midnight Star, the youngest of the Zorya sisters, who sleeps during the day and only appears late at night. She guides Shadow and sets him on his path.
- Conphidance as Okoye (season 1), a scarred slave who leads a revolt.
- Dane Cook as Robbie (season 1), Shadow's best friend who had an affair with Shadow's wife.
- Corbin Bernsen as Vulcan (season 1), who has renewed himself by binding himself to guns and those who worship them.
- Kristin Chenoweth as Easter (season 1), Germanic goddess of spring, fertility, and the dawn.
- Jeremy Davies as Jesus Prime (season 1), one of many versions to appear at the home of Easter.
- Dean Winters as Mr. Town (season 2), a brutal and efficient agent tasked by the New Gods to find out what Shadow knows about Mr. Wednesday's plan.
- Devery Jacobs as Sam Black Crow (seasons 2–3), a fierce and confident college student who travels alone in his dusty pickup truck, picking up hitchhikers and photographing them. He is spiritually cynical for someone who claims to believe in so much.
- Andrew Koji as Mr. Xie (season 2), the CEO of a company in Silicon Valley.
- Danny Trejo as Mr. World (season 3)
- Marilyn Manson as Johan Wengren (season 3)

== Episodes ==
Season	Episodes	Originally released	
Season	Episodes	First released	Last released
1	8	April 30, 2017	June 18, 2017
2	8	March 10, 2019	April 28, 2019
3	10	January 10, 2021	March 21, 2021

=== Season 1 (2017) ===
No. overall	No. in season	Title	Directed by	Teleplay by	Original release date	U.S. viewers (millions)
1	1	"The Bone Orchard"	David Slade	Bryan Fuller & Michael Green	April 30, 2017	0.975
2	2	"The Secret of Spoons"	David Slade	Michael Green & Bryan Fuller	May 7, 2017	0.710
3	3	"Head Full of Snow"	David Slade	Bryan Fuller & Michael Green	May 14, 2017	0.716
4	4	"Git Gone"	Craig Zobel	Michael Green & Bryan Fuller	May 21, 2017	0.631
5	5	"Lemon Scented You"	Vincenzo Natali	David Graziano	May 28, 2017	0.666
6	6	"A Murder of Gods"	Adam Kane	Seamus Kevin Fahey and Michael Green & Bryan Fuller	June 4, 2017	0.607
7	7	"A Prayer for Mad Sweeney"	Adam Kane	Maria Melnik	June 11, 2017	0.629
8	8	"Come to Jesus"	Floria Sigismondi	Bekah Brunstetter and Michael Green & Bryan Fuller	June 18, 2017	0.774

=== Season 2 (2019) ===
No. overall	No. in season	Title	Directed by	Teleplay by	Original release date	U.S. viewers (millions)
9	1	"House on the Rock"	Christopher J. Byrne	Jesse Alexander & Neil Gaiman	March 10, 2019	0.520
10	2	"The Beguiling Man"	Frederick E.O. Toye	Tyler Dinucci & Andres Fischer-Centeno	March 17, 2019	0.348
11	3	"Muninn"	Deborah Chow	Heather Bellson	March 24, 2019	0.329
12	4	"The Greatest Story Ever Told"	Stacie Passon	Peter Calloway & Aditi Brennan Kapil	March 31, 2019	0.336
13	5	"The Ways of the Dead"	Salli Richardson-Whitfield	Rodney Barnes	April 7, 2019	0.306
14	6	"Donar the Great"	Rachel Talalay	Adria Lang	April 14, 2019	0.240
15	7	"Treasure of the Sun"	Paco Cabezas	Heather Bellson	April 21, 2019	0.318
16	8	"Moon Shadow"	Christopher J. Byrne	Aditi Brennan Kapil & Jim Danger Gray	April 28, 2019	0.272

=== Season 3 (2021) ===
No. overall	No. in season	Title	Directed by	Teleplay by	Original release date	U.S. viewers (millions)
17	1	"A Winter's Tale"	Jon Amiel	David Paul Francis	January 10, 2021	0.209
18	2	"Serious Moonlight"	Julian Holmes	Moises Verneau	January 17, 2021	0.185
19	3	"Ashes and Demons"	Thomas Carter	Anne Kenney	January 24, 2021	0.160
20	4	"The Unseen"	Eva Sørhaug	Nick Gillie	January 31, 2021	0.204
21	5	"Sister Rising"	Nick Copus	Damian Kindler	February 14, 2021	0.123
22	6	"Conscience of the King"	Mark Tinker	Aric Avelino	February 21, 2021	0.197
23	7	"Fire and Ice"	Rachel Goldberg	Anne Kenney & David Paul Francis	February 28, 2021	0.180
24	8	"The Rapture of Burning"	Tim Southam	Holly Moyer	March 7, 2021	0.110
25	9	"The Lake Effect"	Metin Hüseyin	Laura Pusey & Damian Kindler	March 14, 2021	0.153
26	10	"Tears of the Wrath-Bearing Tree"	Russell Fine	Laura Pusey & Ryan Spencer	March 21, 2021	0.182

== Production ==
=== Development ===
In 2011, American Gods author Neil Gaiman stated at the Edinburgh International Book Festival that HBO had expressed an interest in adapting the novel into a television series. In March 2013, Gaiman spoke of the project's progress at the Cambridge International Student Film Festival, and confirmed that the prospective series' opening episode would "contain new elements and details" while still remaining "a lot like the opening chapters of the book". He also commented that the book would only make up the first two seasons of the show and that he was still working on the pilot script, as his first script was not close enough to his book for HBO's satisfaction. In November 2013, Gaiman announced on Reddit that the TV series was still in the works but no longer at HBO. In 2014, HBO's president of programming Michael Lombardo revealed that the project had been abandoned because they could not get the script right: "We tried three different writers, we put a lot of effort into it. Some things just don't happen".

In February 2014, Fremantle Media acquired the rights to adapt the novel as a fantasy drama series. In July 2014, it was announced that Starz would be developing the series with Bryan Fuller and Michael Green. Fuller stated that the series would be "[following] the events of the books but expanding those events, and expanding the point of view to go above and beyond Shadow and Wednesday". Permission has been given for the series to incorporate elements from the book's companion, Anansi Boys. Fuller also confirmed that Gaiman is "very involved" with the production and expressed his hope that Gaiman would write an episode himself.

On June 16, 2015, Starz officially announced that it had greenlit the series. During an interview with Neil Gaiman on June 24, 2016, he discussed plans for future seasons of the show beyond the first, should it be continued, and noting that the first season only covers the first third of the novel. Gaiman stated in an interview in October 2018 that the plan was to make five seasons of the series.

On May 10, 2017, the series was renewed for a second season. On November 29, 2017, it was announced that Fuller and Green were departing the show and were to be replaced as showrunners for season two after having completed writing roughly half of the season's scripts. On February 2, 2018, Jesse Alexander was announced as co-showrunner for the second season alongside Gaiman, however Alexander was removed in September 2018. With no showrunner, producing director Chris Byrne and line producer Lisa Kussner were left in charge. Production began on the second season in April 2018, and with the season premiering on March 10, 2019.

American Gods was renewed for a third season on March 15, 2019, with Charles Eglee announced as the showrunner for the third season. The season consists of ten episodes, and was scheduled to film between September 20, 2019, and March 6, 2020. The third season premiered on January 10, 2021.

By April 2019, Gaiman and Eglee had begun to plan a fourth season. On March 29, 2021, Starz canceled the series after three seasons.

=== Writing ===
Fuller stated that he wanted the Old Gods to be portrayed as gritty and rustic to "demonstrate the well-worn aspects of their religion and the consequences of going without faith for so long", while the New Gods are portrayed as slick and updated with their technology to illuminate "how valuable and pertinent they are, in their own religions."

=== Casting ===
On January 28, 2016, Ricky Whittle was cast as the lead character, Shadow Moon. On March 2, 2016, it was announced that Ian McShane had been cast as Mr. Wednesday. Nicolas Cage revealed in a 2016 interview he had been offered the part of Wednesday, but turned it down. It was later announced on March 17, 2016, that Emily Browning would play Laura Moon, Shadow's wife. On March 23, 2016, it was announced that Sean Harris, Yetide Badaki and Bruce Langley would play the respective roles of Mad Sweeney, Bilquis and Technical Boy. On April 14, 2016, Jonathan Tucker and Crispin Glover were cast as Low Key Lyesmith and Mr. World. On May 6, 2016, it was announced that Sean Harris had departed the series after a week of filming for personal reasons and the role of Mad Sweeney was being recast. On May 11, 2016, it was announced that Pablo Schreiber would take over the role of Mad Sweeney. In June 2016, it was announced that Gillian Anderson would portray Media.

In December 2019, Orlando Jones stated that he had been fired from American Gods in September. He alleged that the new showrunner, Charles Eglee, decided that his character, Mr. Nancy, sends "the wrong message for black America". In response, a spokesperson for the series stated that Jones' contract was not renewed because Mr. Nancy does not appear in the part of the book on which the season 3 episodes are based.

=== Opening titles ===
The opening sequence was created by production studio Elastic and depicts a totem pole covered with the juxtaposition of symbols, icons, and forms from religions, modern life, and pop culture. Fuller stated that a totem was chosen to represent both the United States' original faith system, Native American spirituality, and "as something that gave a cohesive quality to all these disparate ideas". Creative director Patrick Clair said he was not interested in depicting every god featured in the novel, so he just tried to make "deities inspired by gods across all manner of different religions – but messed up in ways that we found to be interesting, sticky, sort of sexy, challenging, dirty, wrong, but hopefully interesting," such as a crucified astronaut, a sphinx built out of an Aibo, and a Menorah with electric sockets and DIN connectors in its branches. The overall aesthetic aimed for the "really modern, occasionally very tacky, vision of the underbelly of America", with the designers taking reference from strip club decoration and making the backgrounds using textures of vinyl, fake leather, and concrete surfaces. Brian Reitzell composed the theme music, which according to Fuller, represented "male and female energy coming in at different places as part of representations of divinity".

== Release ==
=== Marketing ===
The first trailer for the series was released on July 22, 2016, at San Diego Comic-Con.

=== Broadcast ===
American Gods premiered on Sunday each week in the U.S. on the Starz app, before airing the same day on Starz at 9:00 pm Eastern. Each episode became available internationally on Amazon Video the day after the U.S. broadcast.

== Reception ==
=== Critical response ===
The first season of American Gods received largely positive reviews from critics. On Rotten Tomatoes, it has a 92% rating with an average score of 8.15 out of 10 based on 272 reviews with the consensus stating: "American Gods opens with a series of wildly ambitious gambits – and rewards viewers' faith with a promising first season whose visual riches are matched by its narrative impact." On Metacritic, it has a score of 77 out of 100 based on 36 reviews, indicating "generally favorable reviews".

The second season received mixed reviews. On Rotten Tomatoes, it has a 61% rating with an average score of 6.05 of 10 based on 106 reviews, with the consensus stating: "American Gods retains its bombastic style but loses its divine inspiration in a derivative second season that, after a change in show-runners and even some crucial cast members, feels like a false idol." On Metacritic, it has a score of 47 out of 100 based on 9 reviews, indicating "mixed or average reviews".

On Rotten Tomatoes, the third season has a 79% rating with an average score of 6.9 out of 10 based on 19 reviews, with the critical consensus stating, "Though it's unlikely to bring anyone back into the fold, American Gods' tighter focus and strong performances may be enough for fans still holding out hope for a solid finish." On Metacritic, it has a score of 69 out of 100 based on 4 reviews, indicating "generally favorable reviews".

=== Accolades ===
Year	Award	Category	Nominee(s)	Result	Ref.
2017	Primetime Emmy Awards	Outstanding Main Title Design	Patrick Clair, Raoul Marks, Devin Maurer and Jeff Han	Nominated	
2017	Primetime Emmy Awards	Outstanding Special Visual Effects	Kevin Tod Haug, David Stump, Jeremy Ball, Bernice Charlotte Howes, Jessica Smith, Josh Carlton, Pierre Buffin, James Cooper and Aymeric Perceval (for "The Bone Orchard")	Nominated	
2017	Black Reel Awards	Outstanding Guest Performer: Drama Series	Orlando Jones	Nominated	
2018	Critics' Choice Awards	Best Drama Series	American Gods	Nominated	
2018	Critics' Choice Awards	Best Actor in a Drama Series	Ian McShane	Nominated	
2018	Critics' Choice Awards	Best Supporting Actress in a Drama Series	Gillian Anderson	Nominated	
2018	Satellite Awards	Best Television Series – Genre	American Gods	Nominated	
2018	Saturn Awards	Best Fantasy Television Series	American Gods	Nominated	
2018	Saturn Awards	Best Actor on Television	Ricky Whittle	Nominated	
2018	Saturn Awards	Best DVD or Blu-ray Television Release	American Gods: Season One	Won	
2019	Saturn Awards	Saturn Award for Best Fantasy Television Series	American Gods	Nominated	
