= Anne Kenney =

Television writer and producer

- Born: Beaverton, Oregon, U.S.
- Education: Ohio University
- Occupations: Television producer and writer
- Years active: 1987–present

Anne Kenney is an American television writer and producer. She was an executive producer and writer for Outlander. She worked extensively on L.A. Law in both capacities. Her other television credits include Family Law, Beautiful People, The Division, ER, Hellcats, Switched at Birth, Outlander, and American Gods.

She was born in Beaverton, Oregon and is an alumna of Ohio University.
