= Ashley Reyes =

American actress

- Born: 1994 or 1995 (age 31–32)
- Years active: 2019-present
- Known for: Walker, How I Met Your Father

Ashley Reyes is an American actress, known for her role as Cassie Perez in The CW television series Walker.

== Early life and education ==
Reyes was raised in Commack, New York, where she attended Commack High School. She went on to study acting at the London Academy of Music and Dramatic Art, graduating in 2016. She has been certified in stage combat by the British Academy of Dramatic Combat.

== Career ==
In October 2019, Reyes was cast in the third season of the Starz television series American Gods in a series regular role. In November 2020, she was cast in the comedy horror film Slayers. She was cast in a recurring role in Hulu's How I Met Your Father in August 2021, before joining the cast of Walker in its second season, replacing Lindsey Morgan upon her departure.

In October 2023, she was cast alongside Michael Shannon and Eva Longoria in the dark comedy film Dead Guy, which completed filming during the 2023 SAG-AFTRA strike under an interim agreement.

== Filmography ==
=== Film ===
Year	Title	Role	Notes
2007	Where God Left His Shoes	Child Shopper	
2014	Night Has Settled	Daisy	
2022	Slayers	Natalie	
TBA	Dead Guy	Valerie	Post-production

=== Television ===
Year	Title	Role	Notes
2021	American Gods	Cordelia	Main role, 10 episodes (season 3)
2022–2023	How I Met Your Father	Hannah	Recurring role, 13 episodes
2022–2024	Walker	Cassie Perez	Main role, 42 episodes (season 2–4)
2025	The Irrational	Victoria	1 episode
2025	The Morning Show	Ariana	2 episodes
2026	M.I.A.	Gabriela	2 episodes

=== Video games ===
Year	Title	Role	Notes
2025	Battlefield 6	Simone "Gecko" Espina	Voice & Mo-Cap
