= Lakeside, Wisconsin =

- Town
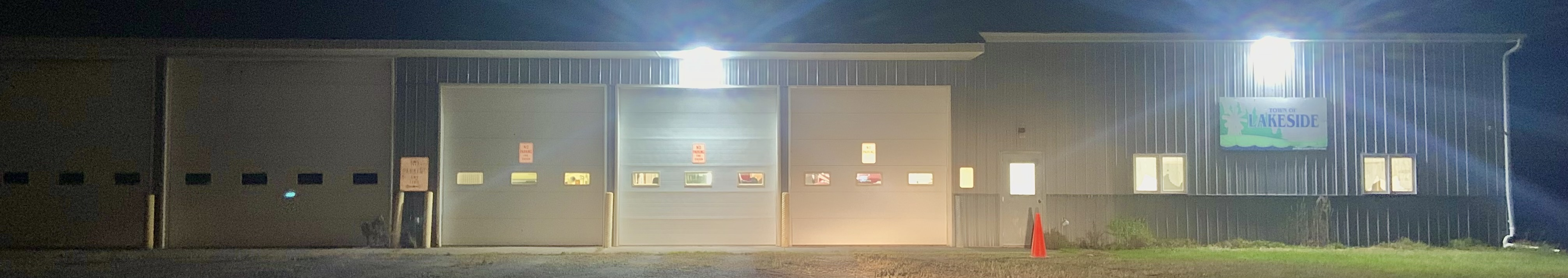
- Town hall

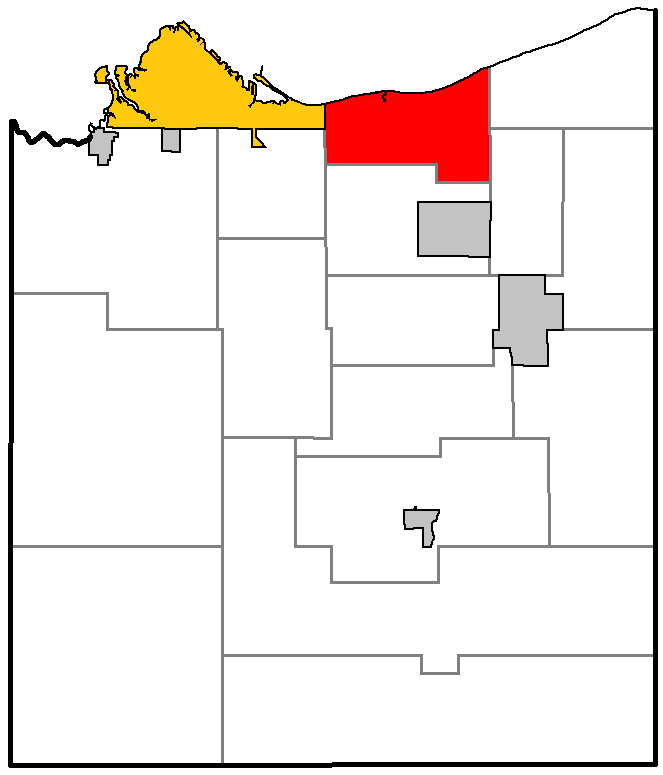
- Location of Lakeside, within Douglas County
- Coordinates: 46°38′46″N 91°51′2″W
- Country: United States
- State: Wisconsin
- County: Douglas

Area
  - Total: 39.9 sq mi (103.3 km^{2})
  - Land: 39.8 sq mi (103.2 km^{2})
  - Water: 0.039 sq mi (0.1 km^{2})
- Elevation: 735 ft (224 m)

Population (2020)
  - Total: 681
  - Density: 17.1/sq mi (6.60/km^{2})
- Time zone: UTC-6 (Central (CST))
  - Summer (DST): UTC-5 (CDT)
- ZIP codes: 54864
- Area codes: 715 and 534
- FIPS code: 55-41800
- GNIS feature ID: 1583517
- Website: https://townoflakesidewi.gov/

Lakeside is a town in Douglas County, Wisconsin, United States. The population was 681 at the 2020 census. The town was named for its location at the shore of Lake Superior.

== Transportation ==
Wisconsin Highway 13 serves as a main route in the community.

== Geography ==
According to the United States Census Bureau, the town has a total area of 39.9 square miles (103.3 km^{2}), of which 39.9 square miles (103.2 km^{2}) is land and 0.04 square mile (0.1 km^{2}) (0.08%) is water.

The town of Lakeside is located 17 miles east of the city of Superior.

== Demographics ==
As of the census of 2000, there were 609 people, 226 households, and 169 families residing in the town. The population density was 15.3 people per square mile (5.9/km^{2}). There were 264 housing units at an average density of 6.6 per square mile (2.6/km^{2}). The ethnic makeup of the town was 97.87% White, 0.66% Native American, and 1.48% from two or more races. Hispanic or Latino of any race were 0.33% of the population.

There were 226 households, out of which 32.7% had children under the age of 18 living with them, 64.2% were married couples living together, 6.2% had a female householder with no husband present, and 25.2% were non-families. 19.5% of all households were made up of individuals, and 8.4% had someone living alone who was 65 years of age or older. The average household size was 2.69 and the average family size was 3.15.

In the town, the population was spread out, with 26.6% under the age of 18, 6.1% from 18 to 24, 31.2% from 25 to 44, 24.1% from 45 to 64, and 12.0% who were 65 years of age or older. The median age was 38 years. For every 100 females, there were 105.1 males. For every 100 females age 18 and over, there were 102.3 males.

The median income for a household in the town was $42,125, and the median income for a family was $45,625. Males had a median income of $34,306 versus $21,080 for females. The per capita income for the town was $17,309. About 7.1% of families and 8.2% of the population were below the poverty line, including 9.3% of those under age 18 and 7.7% of those age 65 or over.
