= Zorya =

Slavic guardian deity of the dawn

- Dawn
- Other names: Zaranitsa, Zarya, Zara, Zaria, Zoryushka
- Color: Red, gold, yellow, rose

Equivalents
- Greek: Eos
- Hindu: Ushas
- Indo-European: H₂éwsōs
- Norse: Eostre
- Roman: Aurora

Zorya (lit. "Dawn"; also many variants: Zarya, Zaria, Zorza, Zirnytsia, Zaranitsa, Zoryushka, etc.) is a figure in Slavic folklore, a feminine personification of dawn, possibly goddess. Depending on tradition, she may appear as a singular entity, or two or three sisters at once. Although Zorya is etymologically unrelated to the Proto-Indo-European goddess of the dawn *H₂éwsōs, she shares most of her characteristics. She is often depicted as the sister of the Sun, the Moon, and Danica, the Morning Star with which she is sometimes identified. She lives in the Palace of the Sun, opens the gate for him in the morning so that he can set off on a journey through the sky, guards his white horses, (Note: In a tale Zorya is described as preparing the "fiery horses" of her brother, the Sun, at the beginning and at the end of the day.) she is also described as a virgin. In the Eastern Slavic tradition of zagovory she represents the supreme power that a practitioner appeals to. Although popular in modern Slavic paganism, Zorya is entirely unattested in the historical record.

== Etymology ==
The Slavic word zora "dawn, aurora" (from Proto-Slavic *zořà), and its variants, comes from the same root as the Slavic word zrěti ("to see, observe", from PS *zьrěti), which originally may have meant "shine". The word zara may have originated under the influence of the word žar "heat" (PS *žarь). PS *zořà comes from the Proto-Balto-Slavic *źoriˀ (cf. Lithuanian žarà, žarijà), the etymology of the root is unclear.

== Comparative mythology ==
The Proto-Indo-European reconstructed goddess of the dawn is *H₂éwsōs. Her name was reconstructed using a comparative method on the basis of the names of Indo-European goddesses of the dawn, e.g. Greek Eos, Roman Aurora, or Vedic Ushas; similarly, on the basis of the common features of the goddesses of the dawn, the features of the Proto-Indo-European goddess were also reconstructed.

Although the Zorya cult is only attested in folklore, its roots may go back to Indo-European antiquity, and the Zorya herself manifests most of *H₂éwsōs characteristics. Zorya shares the following characteristics with most goddesses of the dawn:

1. She appears in the company of St. George and St. Nicholas (interpreted as divine twins)
2. Red, gold, yellow, rose colors
3. She lives overseas, on the island of Buyan
4. Opens the door to the Sun
5. She owned a golden boat and a silver oar

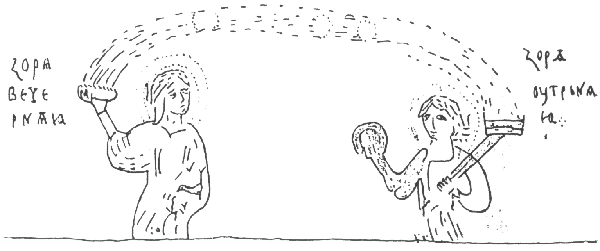
Evening and morning Zoryas from Chludov Psalter

L.A. Zarubin, who was a Slavonic scholar of the 20th century, undertook a comparison between Slavic folklore and the Indo-Aryan Rigveda and Atharvaveda, where images of the Sun and its companions, the Dawns, have been preserved. These non-slavic images date back to ancient concepts from the initially fetishistic (the Sun in the form of a ring or circle) to the later anthropomorphic. Chludov's Novgorod Psalter of the late 13th century contains a miniature depicting two women. One of them, fiery red, signed as "morning zorya", holds a red sun in her right hand in the form of a ring, and in her left hand she holds a torch resting on her shoulder, ending in a box from which emerges a light green stripe passing into dark green. This stripe ends in another woman's right hand, in green, signed as "evening zorya", with a bird emerging from her left sleeve. This should be interpreted as the Morning Zorya releasing the Sun on its daily journey, and at sunset the Evening Zorya awaits to meet the Sun. A very similar motif was found in a cave temple from the 2nd or 3rd century AD in Nashik, India. The bas-relief depicts two women: one using a torch to light the circle of the Sun, and the other expecting it at sunset. Some other bas-reliefs depict two goddesses of the dawn, Ushas and Pratyusha, and the Sun, accompanied by Dawns, appears in several hymns. The Sun in the form of a wheel appears in the Indo-Aryan Rigveda, or the Norse Edda, as well as in folklore: during the annual festivals of the Germanic peoples and Slavs, they lit a wheel which, according to medieval authors, was supposed to symbolize the sun.

Similar images to the one from the Psalter and the Nashik appear in various parts of Slavic lands, e.g. On a carved and painted gate of a Slovak peasant estate (village of Očová): According to Zarubin, on one of the pillars is carved the Morning Zorya, with a golden head, above her is a glow, and even higher is the Sun, which rolls along an arched road, and on the other pillar is carved the Evening Zorya, above it is a setting sun; however, as the identity of the figures (along with other details provided by Zarubin, such as coloration) is not actually discussed by the book he cites for this part, this is only Zarubin's interpretation. There are also darkened suns on this relief, possibly dead suns mentioned by Afanasiev as appearing in Slavic folklore. These motifs are also confirmed by the Russian saying "The sun will not rise without the Morning Zoryushka". Such a motif was also found on the back of a 19th-century sled where the Sun, in the form of a circle, is in the palace and two Zoryas stand in the exit, and on a peasant rushnyk from the Tver region where Zoryas on horseback rides up to the Sun, one is red and the other is green.

=== Baltic mythology ===
According to scholarship, Lithuanian folklore attests a similar dual role for luminous deities Vakarine and Ausrine: Vakarine, the Evening Star, made the bed for solar goddess Saulė, and Aušrinė, the Morning Star, lit the fire for her as she prepared for another day's journey. In other accounts, Ausrine and Vakarine are said to be daughters of the female Sun (Saule) and male Moon (Meness), and they tend their mother's palace and horses.

== Russian tradition ==
In Russian tradition, they often appear as two virgin sisters: Zorya Utrennyaya (Morning Zorya, from útro "morning") as the goddess of dawn, and Zorya Vechernyaya (Evening Aurora, from véčer "evening") as the goddess of dusk. Each was to stand on a different side of the golden throne of the Sun. The Morning Zorya opened the gate of the heavenly palace when the Sun set out in the morning, and the Evening Zorya closed the gate when the Sun returned to his abode for the night. The headquarters of Zorya was to be located on Buyan Island.

A myth from a later period speaks of three Zoryas and their special task:

There are in the sky three little sisters, three little Zorya: she of the Evening, she of Midnight, and she of Morning. Their duty is to guard a dog which is tied by an iron chain to the constellation of the Little Bear. When the chain breaks it will be the end of the world.

=== In folk incantations and popular medicine ===
Zara-Zaranitsa Krasnaya Devitsa (aka "Dawn the Red Maiden") appears interchangeably with Maria (Mother of God) in different versions of the same zagovory plots as the supreme power that a practitioner applies to.

She was also prayed to as Zarya for good harvests and health:

Ho, thou morning zarya, and thou evening zarya! fall upon my rye, that it may grow up tall as a forest, stout as an oak!

Mother zarya [apparently twilight here] of morning and evening and midnight! as ye quietly fade away and disappear, so may both sicknesses and sorrows in me, the servant of God, quietly fade and disappear—those of the morning, and of the evening, and of the midnight!

Professor Bronislava Kerbelytė cited that in Russian tradition, the Zoryas were also invoked to help in childbirth (with the appellation "зорки заряночки") and to treat the baby (calling upon "заря-девица", or "утренняя заря Параскавея" and "вечерняя заря Соломонея"). (Note: "Заря-зарница, красная дѣвица,/ Утренняя заря Прасковья, Крикса, Фокса, / Уйми свой крикъ и дай младенцу сонъ. / Заря-зарница, молодая дѣвица, / Вечерняя варя Соломонѳя, Крикса, Фокса, / Уйми свой крикъ и дай младенцу сонъ".)

Zarya was also invoked as protectress and to dispel nightmares and sleeplessness:

Заря, зарница, васъ три сестрицы, утренняя, полуденная, вечерняя, полуночная, сыми съ раба Божія (имя) тоску, печаль, крикъ, безсонницу, подай ему сонъ со всѣхъ сторонъ, со всѣхъ святыхъ, со всѣхъ небесныхъ.

In another incantation, Zarya-Zarnitsa is invoked along with a "morning Irina" and a "Midday Daria" to dispel a child's sadness and take it away "beyond the blue ocean". (Note: Other songs and charms can be found in "РУССКИЙ КАЛЕНДАРНО-ОБРЯДОВЫЙ ФОЛЬКЛОР СИБИРИ И ДАЛЬНЕГО ВОСТОКА. ПЕСНИ. ЗАГОВОРЫ". Издание подготовили Ф.Ф.Болонев, М.Н.Мельников, Н.В.Леонова. Научный редактор В.С.Кузнецова. Новосибирск: Наука Сибирское предприятие РАН, 1997. pp. 397, 410, 417, 420-422, 428-429, 432-433, 460.) (Note: Further charms are found in Майков Л. Н. "Великорусские заклинания". С.-Петербург: 1869. pp. 32-33, 42, 51, 97, 107, 111.)

=== Further attestation ===
Croatian historian Natko Nodilo noted in his study The Ancient Faith of the Serbs and the Croats that the ancient Slavs saw Zora as a "shining maiden" ("svijetla" i "vidna" djevojka), and Russian riddles described her as a maiden that lived in the sky ("Zoru nebesnom djevojkom").

As for the parentage of the Dawn, she is referred "in a Russian song" as "dear little Dawn" and as the "Sister of the Sun".

== Belarusian tradition ==
In Belarusian folklore she appears as Zaranitsa (Зараніца) or as Zara-zaranitsa (Зара-Зараніца). In one of the passages, Zaranica is met by St. George and St. Nicholas, who, according to comparative mythology, function as divine twins, who in Indo-European mythologies are usually brothers of the goddess of the dawn: "Saint George was walking with Saint Nicholas and met Aurora".

In folklore she also appears in the form of a riddle:

Zara-zaranitsa, a beautiful virgin, was walking in the sky, and dropped her keys. The moon saw them, but said nothing. The sun saw them, and lifted them up.

This is about the dew, which the moon does not react to and which disappears under the influence of the sun. Zara is probably simply the goddess of the dawn, and can be translated literally as "Dawn", and Zaranica is a diminutive and may indicate respect towards her.

In Belarusian tradition, the stars are sometimes referred to as zorki and zory, such as the star Polaris, known as Zorny Kol ('star pole') and polunochna zora ('star of midnight').

== Polish tradition ==
In Polish folklore, there are three sister Zoras (Trzy Zorze): Morning Zorza (Polish: Zorza porankowa or Utrenica), Midday Zora (Zorza południowa or Południca) and Evening Zora (Zorza wieczorowa or Wieczornica), which appear in Polish folk charms and, according to Andrzej Szyjewski, represent a threefold division of the day. They also function as Rozhanitsy:

Zarze, zarzyce, three sisters. The Mother of God went on the sea, gathering golden froth; St. John met her: Where are you going, Mother? I am going to cure my little son.	Zorzyczki, zorzyczki, there are three of you she of morning, she of midday, she of evening. Take from my child the crying, give him back his sleep.	Zorze, zorzeczeńki! You're all my sisters! Get on your crow horse And ride for my companion (lover). So he cannot go without me neither sleep nor eat, nor sit down, nor talk. That I may please him in standing, in working, in willing. That I may be thankful and pleasant to God and men, and this companion of mine.

Another folk saying from Poland is thus: Żarze, zarzyczki, jest was trzy, zabierzcie od mojego dziecka płakanie, przywróćcie mu spanie.

In a magical love charm from Poland, the girl asks for the dawn (or morning-star) to go to the girl's beloved and force him to love no other but her:

Witajze zorze
Welcome, morning star

== Ukrainian tradition ==
Ukrainian also has words deriving from *zořà: зі́рка (dialectal зі́ра zira and зі́ри ziry) zírka, a diminutive meaning 'little star', 'starlet', 'asterisk'; зі́рнйця zirnitsa (or зі́рнйці zirnytsi, a poetic term meaning 'little star', 'aurora, dawn'.

In a saying collected in "Харківщині" (Kharkiv Oblast), it is said that "there are many stars (Зірок) in the sky, but there are only two Zori: the morning one (світова) and the evening one (вечірня)".

In an orphan's lament, the mourner says she will take the "keys of the dawn" ("То я б в зорі ключі взяла").

In a magical love charm, the girl invokes "three star-sisters" (or the "dawn-sisters"):

Vy zori-zirnytsi, vas na nebi tri sestrytsi: odna nudna, druga pryvitna, a tretia pechal'na
You dawn-stars, you three sisters in the sky: one dull, the second welcoming, and the third sorrowful

Zorya also patronized marriages, as manifested by her frequent appearance in wedding songs, and arranged marriages between the gods. In one of the folk songs, where the Moon meets Aurora while wandering in the sky, she is directly attributed this function:

O Dawn, Dawn! Wherever hast thou been?
Wherever hast thou been? Where dost thou intend to live?

Where do I intend to live? Why at Pan Ivan's, (Note: Pan (Master) Ivan is supposed to be some kind of celestial being, sometimes mentioned in songs also as "Brother Ivanushko". In Ukrainian folklore, young Ivan is the son of the Sun and calls his sister "Bright Zorya".)
At Pan Ivan's in his Court,
In his Court, and in his dwelling,
And in his dwelling are two pleasures:
The first pleasure—to get his son married;
And second pleasure—to give his daughter in marriage

== Slovene tradition ==
In a Slovene folksong titled "Zorja prstan pogubila" (Zorja lost her ring), the singer asks for mother (majka), brother (bratec), sister (sestra) and darling (dragi) to look for it.

According to Monika Kropej, in Slovene mythopoetic tradition, the sun rises in the morning, accompanied by the morning dawn, named Sončica (from sonce 'sun'), and sets in the evening joined by an evening dawn named Zarika (from zarja 'dawn'). These female characters also appear in a Slovenian narrative folk song about their rivalry. Fanny Copeland also interpreted both characters as mythological Sun and Dawn, as well as mentioned another ballad, titled Ballad of Beautiful Zora. Slovene folklorist Jakob Kelemina (sl), in his book about Slovene myths and folk-tales, stated that a Zora appears as the daughter of the Snake Queen (possibly an incarnation of the night) in the so-called Kresnik Cycle.

== East Slavic tradition ==
According to professor Daiva Vaitkevičienė, the Virgin Mary most likely replaced deity Zaria in East Slavic charms. The Virgin Mary is also addressed as "Zaria" in Russian charms.

In a charm collected in Arkhangelsky and published in 1878 by historian Alexandra Efimenko, the announcer invokes зоря Мария and заря Маремъяния, translated as "Maria-the-Dawn" and "Maremiyaniya-the-Dawn".

In another charm, the "Evening Star Mariya" and "Morning Star Maremiyana" are invoked to take away sleeplessness.

== Slavic tradition ==
Goddess Zaria (alternatively, a trio of deities named Zori) is also invoked in charms against illness. According to professor Daiva Vaitkevičienė, this "is a very popular motif of the Slavic charms".

== Legacy ==
The word "Zorya" has become a loanword in Romanian as its word for "dawn" (zori) and as the name of a piece of music sung by colindători (zorile).

The Morning Star is also known as dennica, zornica or zarnica.

In Serbo-Croatian, the planet Venus is known as Zornjača, when it appears in the morning, and Večernjača when it appears at night.

In a folksong, the Dawn/Morning Star is depicted as the bride of a male Moon.

In some Croatian folk songs, collected and published in 1876 by Rikardo Ferdinand Plohl-Herdvigov, a "zorja" is used along with "Marja" in "Zorja Marja prsten toči"; and referred to as "Zorja, zorija" in "Marija sinku načinila košulju";

== Zorya in culture ==
- Popular folk song Zoryushka (Зорюшка) sung on a wedding day.
- In the 2001 novel American Gods, and its 2017 television adaptation, author Neil Gaiman depicts Zorya as a triple goddess: Zorya Utrennyaya (morning star), Zorya Polunochnaya (midnight star), and Zorya Vechernyaya (evening star).
- Zorya appears in The Iron Druid Chronicles by Kevin Hearne.
- One of the works by Australian composer Julian Cochran is named Zorya Vechernyaya.
- One of the albums by Czech composer Floex is called Zorya, and the last number on the album is called Zorya Polunochnaya.
- Zorya figures prominently in the game Eve Online as the leader of the invading precursor entity, the Triglavian Collective.

== See also ==
- Ēostre
- Uzume
- Dali
- Orvandil

== Bibliography ==
- Afanasyev, Alexander Nikolayevich (1865). Поэтические воззрения славян на природу: Опыт сравнительного изучения славянских преданий и верований в связи с мифическими сказаниями других родственных народов [Poetic views of the Slavs on nature: An experience of a comparative study of Slavic traditions and beliefs in connection with the mythical tales of other kindred peoples] (in Russian). Vol. 1. Moscow: Izd. K. Soldatenkova.
- Bartmiński, Jerzy (1996). Słownik stereotypów i symboli ludowych. Volume I: Kosmos. Part I: Niebo, światła niebieskie, ogień, kamienie (in Polish). Lublin: Wydawnictwo UMCS. ISBN 83-227-0901-3.
- Cochran, Julian (n.d.). "Sheet Music of Julian Cochran: Urtext Editions". juliancochran.org.
- Czernik, Stanisław (1985). Trzy zorze dziewicze: wśród zamawiań i zaklęć [Three Virgin Aurorae: Among Orders and Spells] (in Polish) (2nd ed.). Łódź: Wydawn. Łódzkie. ISBN 83-218-0422-5.
- Derksen, Rick (2008). Etymological dictionary of the Slavic inherited lexicon. Leiden: Brill. ISBN 978-90-474-2816-9.
- Eliade, Mircea (1980). "History of Religions and "Popular" Cultures". History of Religions. 20 (1–2): 1–26. doi:10.1086/462859. JSTOR 1062333. S2CID 162757197.
- Graves, Robert (1987). New Larousse Encyclopedia of Mythology: With an Introduction by Robert Graves. Gregory Alexinsky. New York: Crescent Books. ISBN 0-517-00404-6.
- Griffiths, Eleanor Bley (2017-08-13). "Who are the Zorya sisters in American Gods, and what myths did Neil Gaiman base them on? American Gods mythology explained. Amazon Prime, Starz". Radio Times.
- Grzegorzewic, Ziemisław (2016). O Bogach i ludziach. Praktyka i teoria Rodzimowierstwa Słowiańskiego [On Gods and People. The practice and theory of the Slavic native religion] (in Polish). Olsztyn. ISBN 978-83-940180-8-5.
- Sańko, Siarhei (2018). "Reflexes of Ancient Ideas about Divine Twins in the Images of Saints George and Nicholas in Belarusian Folklore". Folklore: Electronic Journal of Folklore. 72: 15–40. doi:10.7592/fejf2018.72.sanko.
- "The Scope - Triglavians Take Over Billboards", EVE Online, 15 March 2019, archived from the original on 2021-12-21 – via YouTube
- Shedden-Ralston, William Ralston (1872). The Songs of the Russian People: As Illustrative of Slavonic Mythology and Russian Social Life. Ellis & Green.
- Siewierski, Lechosław (2018-10-03). "[Muzyka] Sound of Triglav – Zoriuszka" (in Polish). Słowianie i Słowianowierstwo.
- Szyjewski, Andrzej (2003). Religia Słowian. Kraków: Wydawnictwo WAM. p. 71. ISBN 83-7318-205-5.
- Toporkov, Andrey (1995). "Zarya". Slavyanskaya Mifologiya: Entsiklopedicheskiy slovar (in Russian). Moscow. p. 189. ISBN 5-7195-0057-X.
- Váňa, Zdeněk (1990). Svět slovanských bohů a démonů [The world of Slavic gods and demons] (in Czech). Prague: Panorama. ISBN 80-7038-187-6.
- Vrtel-Wierczyński, Stefan (1923). Średniowieczna poezja polska świecka [Medieval Polish secular poetry] (in Polish). Kraków: Krakowska Spółka Wydawnicza.
- "Wisła. Miesięcznik Geograficzno-Etnograficzny. 1903 T.17 z.3 - Wielkopolska Biblioteka Cyfrowa" [Vistula. Geographical and Ethnographic monthly. 1903 Vol. 17 z.3 – Greater Poland Digital Library]. wbc.poznan.pl (in Polish). Vol. 17.
- Zarubin, L. A. (1971). "Сходные изображения солнца и зорь у индоарийцев и славян" [Similar images of the sun and dawns among the Indo-Aryans and Slavs]. Советское славяноведение [Soviet Slavic Studies] (in Russian). 6. Moscow: Наука: 70–76. Archived from the original on 2012-04-11.
- "Zorya by Floex". floex.cz. n.d.
