= American Gods =

2001 novel by Neil Gaiman

- Cover of first edition (hardcover)
- Author: Neil Gaiman
- Language: English
- Genre: Fantasy
- Publisher: William Morrow, Headline
- Publication date: 19 June 2001
- Publication place: United Kingdom
- Media type: Print (hardback & paperback)
- Pages: 465
- Awards: Hugo Award for Best Novel (2002), Locus Award for Best Fantasy Novel (2002), Nebula Award for Best Novel (2002)
- ISBN: 0-380-97365-0
- OCLC: 46393953
- Dewey Decimal: 813/.54 21
- LC Class: PR6057.A319 A84 2001
- Followed by: Anansi Boys

American Gods (2001) is a fantasy novel by British author Neil Gaiman. The novel is a blend of Americana, fantasy, and various strands of ancient and modern mythology, all centering on the mysterious and taciturn Shadow.

The book was published in 2001 by Headline in the United Kingdom and by William Morrow in the United States. It gained a positive critical response and won the 2002 Hugo and Nebula awards.

A special tenth anniversary edition, which includes the "author's preferred text" and 12,000 additional words, was published in June 2011 by William Morrow. Two audio versions of the book were produced and published by Harper Audio: an unabridged version of the original published edition, read by George Guidall, released in 2001; a full cast audiobook version of the tenth anniversary edition, released in 2011. In March 2017, The Folio Society published a special collector's edition of American Gods, with many corrections to the author's preferred text version.

In April 2017, Starz began airing a television adaptation of the novel. Bryan Fuller and Michael Green served as showrunners, and Gaiman is an executive producer. Fuller and Green departed the show after the first season.

== Plot summary ==
Shadow Moon is a convict scheduled for release from prison. Two days before his scheduled release, he learns that his wife, Laura, has been killed in a car accident, and he is released early. Shadow is devastated by her death and is distraught to learn that she died alongside his best friend Robbie, with whom she had been having an affair. As he was supposed to get a job from Robbie upon his release from prison, Shadow is out of luck and has to figure out what to do now. With nowhere to go, Shadow takes a job as a bodyguard for a mysterious con man, Mr. Wednesday, and travels with him across the United States. Shadow meets a leprechaun named Mad Sweeney, who gives Shadow a magical gold coin after Shadow beats him in a fight. Shadow later tosses the coin into Laura's grave at her funeral, inadvertently bringing her back from the dead as a revenant. Shadow meets Czernobog and the three Zorya Sisters. One of the sisters gives Shadow a silver coin, coming from the Moon, to protect him. Shadow learns that Wednesday is an incarnation of Odin the All-Father, and that he is recruiting American manifestations of the Old Gods, whose powers have waned as their believers have decreased in number, to participate in a battle against the New Gods – manifestations of what humanity now worships, such as technology, media, pop-culture, and modern means of transport. Shadow meets many of Wednesday's allies, including Mr. Nancy, Easter, Whiskey Jack, and John Chapman.

The New Gods' henchmen, the Spooks, abduct Shadow; Laura rescues him, killing several Spooks in the process. Wednesday tells Shadow to hide with Mr. Ibis and Mr. Jacquel (Thoth and Anubis, respectively), who run a funeral parlor in Cairo, Illinois. Sweeney appears and asks Shadow to give back the coin, which holds all of Sweeney's power. Shadow admits that he no longer has the coin, and Sweeney dies. His body is tended to by Ibis and Jacquel, who lament the loss of another Old God. On the way to the Wisconsin community of Lakeside, Shadow picks up the hitchhiker Samantha Black Crow and drops her off at her house. Once in Lakeside, Shadow hides under the alias "Mike Ainsel" and spends time with several Lakeside residents who all live simple but happy and prosperous lives. Wednesday periodically takes Shadow on jobs to meet other gods. They are pursued all the while by the Spooks, particularly Mr. Town, who blames Shadow for the death of his friends. When a teenager in Lakeside goes missing, Shadow helps the other residents search for her, to no avail. Shadow learns that children and teenagers often go missing from Lakeside. He is then arrested for breaking his parole, but escapes with help from Czernobog and Mr. Nancy.

The New Gods seek to parley with Wednesday, but murder him at the meeting. This act is witnessed by and galvanizes the Old Gods, and they rally to face their enemies in battle at Rock City. While retrieving Wednesday's body, Shadow is surprised to discover his old prison cellmate and mentor, Low Key Lyesmith, is working as a driver for the New Gods. Shadow is bound by his contract with Wednesday to hold his vigil by re-enacting Odin's time hanging from a "World Tree" while pierced by a spear for nine days. During these nine days, he is visited by Horus, who has become mad from living too long as a hawk. Shadow dies and visits the land of the dead, where he is judged by Anubis. Shadow learns that he is Wednesday's (Odin's) son, conceived as part of the deity's plans. During this time, Mr. Town arrives at the World Tree, ordered by Mr. World to cut a branch from it.

Horus finds Easter and convinces her to bring Shadow back to life. Shadow realizes Mr. World is actually Low Key (Loki) Lyesmith, and that Odin and Loki have been working a "two-man con". They orchestrated Shadow's birth, his meeting with Loki in disguise in prison, and Laura's death. Loki had arranged Odin's murder, thus making the battle between the New and Old Gods a sacrifice to Odin, restoring his power, while also allowing Loki to feed on the battle's chaos.

Laura chooses to hitchhike to Rock City and meets Mr. Town, who does not recognize her, and they agree to travel together. During their travels, Laura learns who Mr. Town is and, once they arrive at their destination, kills him and takes the branch he had taken from the World Tree. She meets with Loki and manages to stab him with the World Tree branch, which turns into a spear as she stabs.

Shadow arrives at Rock City and confronts Loki, now gravely wounded, and the ghost of Odin, who reveal their plans. Shadow travels to the site of the battle and explains that both sides have nothing to gain and everything to lose, with Odin and Loki as the only true winners. Shadow tells them the United States is a bad place for Gods, and he recommends they return to their original homelands. The gods depart, Loki dies, and Odin's ghost fades. Laura asks Shadow to take the coin from her, which he does, and she finally dies.

After resting with Mr. Nancy, Shadow remembers a dream where the Hindu god Ganesha told him to "look in the trunk". He returns to Lakeside and walks onto the thinning ice toward the car resting there. He picks the lock and opens the trunk to find the body of the missing teenager inside. He falls through the ice and, while trapped beneath, sees cars from past winters resting on the lake floor. Each one presumably has a child's body locked inside. Shadow is saved by Hinzelmann, who takes him to his house and treats him for hypothermia. Shadow realizes that Hinzelmann is a god and is also responsible for the children's kidnappings and deaths. Hinzelmann explains that he regretfully must take one child as a sacrifice each year in exchange for the town's prosperity. The townspeople are unaware of this and of Hinzelmann's control over the town, as he tries to sacrifice children who no one will greatly miss. Shadow thinks of killing Hinzelmann, but finds he cannot, as Hinzelmann saved his life. However, Chad Mulligan overhears the conversation and shoots Hinzelmann, killing him. Shadow and Chad drive away, with Chad guilt-ridden to the point of suicide. Shadow concludes that this is a fail-safe created by Hinzelmann so that whoever killed him would die soon after. Using magic, Shadow takes Chad's memory of overhearing Hinzelmann and the killing. He leaves Chad and Lakeside behind, understanding that the town's prosperity will likely wither away without Hinzelmann's protection.

In Iceland, Shadow meets another incarnation of Odin (created by the beliefs of Iceland's original settlers), who is much closer to the Odin of mythology than Wednesday. Shadow accuses Odin of Wednesday's actions, but Odin retorts: "He was me, yes. But I am not him." He indicates that Wednesday was the part of him that accompanied his followers when they traveled to the New World and became corrupted as he was gradually forgotten. Shadow gives Wednesday's glass eye to Odin, which Odin places in a leather bag as a keepsake. Shadow performs a simple sleight-of-hand coin trick, which delights Odin, who asks for a repeat performance. Shadow then performs a small piece of real magic, pulling a golden coin from nowhere like Mad Sweeney did when they first met. He then flips the coin up into the air and walks away, wondering if the coin will ever come back down.

== Characters ==
=== Mortals ===
- Shadow Moon – an ex-convict who becomes the reluctant bodyguard and errand boy of Mr. Wednesday (Odin).
- Laura Moon – Shadow's wife, who dies in a car crash at the beginning of the novel, a few days before Shadow is due to be released from prison.
- Samantha "Sam" Black Crow – a hitchhiking college student whom Shadow meets during his journey.
- Chad Mulligan – a kind-hearted chief of police in the town of Lakeside.
- The Black Hats – Mister Road, Mister Town, Mister Wood, and Mister Stone, stand in for the American obsession with conspiracy theories, operating as men in black. They work as spooks for the New Gods.

=== Old Gods ===
- Mr. Wednesday – an aspect of Odin, the Old Norse god of knowledge and wisdom.
- Low-Key Lyesmith – Loki, the Old Norse god of mischief and trickery. He was a close acquaintance of Shadow Moon whilst incarcerated.
- Czernobog – the Slavic god of darkness and twin brother to Belobog, the god of light.
- The Zorya Sisters – relatives of Czernobog, sisters who represent Dawn (Zorya Utrennyaya), Dusk (Zorya Vechernyaya), and the Midnight Star (Zorya Polunochnaya). In Slavic lore, they are servants of Dažbog who guard and watch over the doomsday hound, Simargl. Simargl is said to be chained to the star Polaris in the constellation Ursa Minor (the "Little Bear") and, according to legend, if the chain ever breaks the hound will devour the world.
- Mr. Nancy – Anansi, a trickster spider god from Ghanaian folklore. He often makes fun of people for their stupidity, a recurring aspect of his personality in his old stories.
- Mr. Ibis – Thoth, the Ancient Egyptian god of knowledge and writing. He runs a funeral parlor with Mr. Jacquel in Cairo, Illinois. He often writes short biographies of people who brought folkloric beings with them to the United States.
- Mr. Jacquel – Anubis, the Ancient Egyptian god of the dead and mummification. He is an expert at preparing bodies for the wake at funerals.
- Bast – Bastet, the Ancient Egyptian cat goddess. Often appears as a small house cat and heals Shadow's bruises and aches after he has been beaten.
- Horus – the Ancient Egyptian god of the sky.
- Easter – Ēostre, the Germanic goddess of the dawn.
- Mad Sweeney – Suibhne, a king from an old Irish story. Though not portrayed as such in his story, he calls himself a "Leprechaun" despite his description as being nearly 7-feet-tall. Sweeney is foul-mouthed and a frequent drinker.
- Whiskey Jack – Wisakedjak, a trickster figure of Algonquian mythology. He lives near a Lakota reservation in the badlands with John Chapman, where he is mistaken for Iktomi, a trickster of their culture.
- John Chapman – Johnny Appleseed, described as a "culture hero" rather than a god. He loathes Paul Bunyan (who he incorrectly describes as an advertising ploy) for diverting belief away from him.
- Elvis – Alvíss, a dwarf in Norse mythology. The King of the Dwarves, he is of average height for humans but has dwarfish proportions.
- Elegba and Great Mawu – The gods worshipped by those enslaved coming to America.
- Gwydion – Gwydion fab Dôn, a trickster god of Welsh mythology.
- Hinzelmann – Hinzelmann, a kobold who was formerly revered as a tribal god by ancient Germanic tribes. He protects the town of Lakeside in the guise of an old man.
- Bilquis – the ancient Queen of Sheba, who endures by absorbing her sexual partners, turning them into worshippers
- Mama-Ji – Kali, the Hindu goddess of time and destruction.
- The Jinn – an ifrit taxi-driver that swaps lives with an Omani businessman after a sexual encounter.
- The Land – a buffalo-headed man, the personification of the land as worshipped by Native Americans, who appears to Shadow in his dreams to give him guidance.
- Bearded man – A character similar to Jesus speaks to Shadow in a dream sequence while he is hanging from the world tree. Shadow states that, compared to the other old Gods, he still has a lot of influence. However, the bearded man worries that his teachings have been applied to everything, and as a result also apply to nothing. Gaiman has removed and replaced this section of the book numerous times.
- The Elephant God – Ganesha, the Hindu god of new beginnings; appears to Shadow during the world tree dream sequences. Shadow eventually realizes Ganesha's role is to remove obstacles, and that his cryptic message to 'look in the trunk' is in fact a clue to the location of Alison McGovern's body.
- The Forgettable God – An unknown god whom Mr. Wednesday meets in Las Vegas along with Shadow, whose name slipped from Shadow's mind whenever Mr. Wednesday said it. He has a liking for Soma, a Vedic ritual drink. Gaiman has never confirmed the identity of this god.

=== New Gods ===
- Technical Boy – New God of technology and the Internet, personified as an adult-sized fat child.
- Media – New Goddess of television and pop culture. She often communicates by hijacking whatever is showing on television, for example communicating with Shadow via Lucy Ricardo from I Love Lucy and the cast of Cheers.
- The Intangibles – New Gods of the modern stock market, they are a personification of the "Invisible hand of the market".
- Mr. World – leader of The Black Hats and the New God of globalization.
- Other New Gods mentioned include those of automobiles, locomotives, heavier-than-air flight, cosmetic surgery, and various drugs.

== Influences ==
The novel's dedication reads "for absent friends – Kathy Acker and Roger Zelazny and all points in between."

Gaiman has discussed the origin point for American Gods as a novel, citing his experience as an immigrant in America in 1992, where he began to form the vague idea of the book in his mind. Additionally, while experiencing a layover in an airport in Reykjavik in 1998, Gaiman states that he thought "I wonder if they brought their gods with them, when they went to America?"

The Discworld novel Small Gods explores a similar origin of deities (thoughtform). While Gaiman says that he did not read the book by Terry Pratchett, he thought they shared a worldview due to their same geographic origins and, more importantly, their daily phone conversations. He had also sought advice from Pratchett on resolving plot elements of American Gods.

According to Gaiman, American Gods is not based on Diana Wynne Jones's 1975 novel Eight Days of Luke, "although they bear an odd relationship, like second cousins once removed or something." When working on the structure of a story linking gods and days of the week, he realised that this idea had already been used in Eight Days of Luke. He abandoned the story, but later used the idea when writing American Gods to depict Wednesday and Shadow meeting on the god's namesake day.

Of John James' 1966 novel Votan, Gaiman stated: "I think probably the best book ever done about the Norse was a book that I couldn't allow myself to read between coming up with the idea of American Gods and finishing it. After it was published, I actually sat down and allowed myself to read it for the first time in 15 years, and discovered it was just as good as I thought it was."

In his introduction to Fritz Leiber's The Knight and Knave of Swords, Gaiman acknowledges Leiber's portrayal of Odin and Loki had "definitely smudged into" and informed his take on the characters.

== Writing and promotion ==
The fifteenth word of American Gods is "fuck", which is to help inform readers of a nervous disposition that they can stop reading there, or at least by the end of the extremely peculiar sex scene that closes Chapter 1.

— Neil Gaiman, writing on Tumblr

While Gaiman was writing American Gods, his publishers set up a promotional web site featuring a weblog in which Gaiman described the day-to-day process of writing, revising, publishing, and promoting the novel. After the novel was published, the website evolved into a more general Official Neil Gaiman Web Site. As of 2021, Gaiman sporadically adds to the weblog, describing the writing, revising, publishing, or promoting of his current projects; but tends to use social media like Tumblr or Twitter for more personal details or reader questions.

On 28 February 2008, Gaiman announced on his journal that for one month the complete text of American Gods would be available to the public on his publisher's website.

== Reception ==
The book won the 2002 Hugo, Nebula, Locus, SFX and Bram Stoker Awards, all for Best Novel, and likewise received nominations for the 2001 BSFA Award, as well as the 2002 World Fantasy, International Horror Guild and Mythopoeic, and British Fantasy awards. It won the 2003 Geffen Award.

In May 2010, American Gods was selected in an online poll to be the first "One Book One Twitter" book. In 2014, when the television show adaptation was announced, author Abraham Riesman criticized the move as being a "bad idea", highlighting the aspects of the book that did not age well or were offensive to some cultures. Beyond this, academics have claimed the work has ontological and epistemic implications, and, as part of the body of Gaiman's work, explored the appropriative style.

== Publishing history ==
The book was published in 2001 by Headline in the United Kingdom and by William Morrow in the United States.

A special tenth anniversary edition, which includes the "author's preferred text" and 12,000 additional words, was published in June 2011 by William Morrow. The tenth anniversary text is identical to the signed and numbered limited edition released in 2003 by Hill House Publishers, and to the edition from Headline, Gaiman's publisher in the UK since 2005. The tenth anniversary edition marked the first time the author's preferred text had been available in wide release outside the UK.

Two audio versions of the book were produced and published by Harper Audio. An unabridged version of the original published edition, read by George Guidall, was released in 2001.

A full cast audiobook version of the tenth anniversary edition, including the author's preferred text and 12,000 additional words, was released in 2011. The voice cast included more than a dozen actors, including:

- Fred Berman as Mr. Ibis, Iceman, Gwydoin and Salim
- Dennis Boutsikaris as the Narrator
- Anne Bobby as Audrey Burton, Zorya P., Essie Tregowan, Easter, and Vegas waitress
- Tim Cain as Mr. Nancy
- Richard Ferrone as Low Key Lyesmith, Hinzelmaan, Mr. Stone and Mr. World
- Adam Grupper as Chad Mulligan, Harry Bluejay, Mr. Wood, and Warden
- Sarah Jones as Laura, Bilquis, Mama Zou Zou, Widow Paris, Mama Ji, Diana and Zorya U.
- Pete Larkin as Czernobog, Jacquel, and Whiskey Jack
- Nikhil Maindiratta as Teenage Shadow
- Kathleen McInerney as Samantha Black Crow, Alison McGovern, Smallest Sister, and Squirrel
- Ron McLarty as Mr. Wednesday
- Prentice Onayemi as Sam Fetisher, Agasu, Black deputy and Baron Samedi
- Daniel Oreskes as Shadow
- Paula Parker as Elder Waitress and Shadow's Mother
- Nicole Quinn as Woman as passenger assistance desk and Woman at Amoco cash register
- Maggi-Meg Reed as Marguerite Olsen, bast, Mrs. McCabe (Laura's Mother)
- Yelena Scmulenson as Zorya V. Officer Liz Bute, San Francisco waitress, and Sophie
- Teddy Walsh as Leon
- Alan Winter as Prison guard, Cashier at library sale and Gas station manager
- Oliver Wyman as Mad Sweeney, Technical boy/Fat kid, John Chapman, and Mr. Town

A comic book series, American Gods: Shadows, was published by Dark Horse Comics starting in March 2017. A book of the same name, collecting issues 1 through 9 of the comic book series, was published by Dark Horse Books in February 2018.

In March 2017, The Folio Society published a special collector's edition of American Gods, with many corrections to the author's preferred text version. Gaiman described this edition as 'the cleanest text there has ever been' of the novel.

== In other media ==
=== Comics ===
Dark Horse Comics publishes a series of comic books based on the novel. The comic books were co written by Gaiman and P. Craig Russell. With art by Russell and Scott Hampton, among others.

=== Television ===
Starz developed a television series from the novel with Bryan Fuller and Michael Green. The series debuted in April 2017. At the end of season 1, Fuller stepped down as showrunner and was replaced by Jesse Alexander. The two had previously worked together on Star Trek: Discovery and Hannibal. While the show ended on season 3 without adapting the whole book, production company Fremantle expressed an interest in making a television film to conclude the story, and in 2024 Shadow Moon's actor Ricky Whittle stated he and Gaiman were seeking a streaming service to pull off these plans.

=== Music ===
The power metal band Blind Guardian wrote a song titled "Secrets of the American Gods" based on the novel, on their 2022 album The God Machine.

== Related works ==
Gaiman's next novel, Anansi Boys (2005), was conceived before American Gods and shares a character, Mr. Nancy (Anansi, the spider god of African legend).

In an interview with MTV News published on 22 June 2011, Gaiman said that he had plans for a direct sequel to American Gods. Gaiman had plans for a sequel even while writing the first book and has said that he is likely to focus on the New Gods in the sequel.

In addition to the planned sequel, Gaiman has written two short story sequels featuring Shadow Moon. "The Monarch of the Glen", a novella first published in the 2003 anthology Legends II, takes place in Scotland two years after American Gods. The second short story, "Black Dog", was collected in Gaiman's 2015 Trigger Warning. It takes place a year later in Derbyshire's Peak District. In the introduction for Trigger Warning Gaiman said that he had one final standalone story that would take Shadow to London before he returns to the US and the start of American Gods 2.

== Translations ==
- Amerikāņu dievi (Latvian), ISBN 978-9934-0-2282-1
- Ameerika jumalad (Estonian), ISBN 9985-62-181-6
- Amerykańscy bogowie (Polish), ISBN 83-89004-10-0
- Zei Americani (Romanian), ISBN 973-733-070-6
- אלים אמריקאים (Elim Amerikaim) (Hebrew)
- American Gods (Italian), ISBN 88-04-52083-3
- Deuses Americanos (Portuguese), ISBN 85-87193-59-7
- Američtí bohové (Czech), ISBN 80-85911-98-1
- Americkí bohovia (Slovak), ISBN 978-80-556-0754-2
- Unohdetut jumalat ("Forgotten Gods") (Finnish), ISBN 951-1-18055-X
- Amerikai istenek (Hungarian), ISBN 9786155049705
- American Gods (Spanish), ISBN 84-8431-627-0
- Američki Bogovi (Croatian), ISBN 953-220-126-2
- Ameriški bogovi (Slovenian), ISBN 978-961-274-129-7
- Aмерички Богови (Serbian), ISBN 86-7436-039-4
- Американские Боги (Russian), ISBN 5-17-019844-2
- Amerikos dievai (Lithuanian), ISBN 9986-97-101-2
- Amerikan Tanrıları (Turkish), ISBN 978-975-10-1904-2
- American Gods (German), ISBN 3-453-40037-2
- Amerikanska gudar (Swedish), ISBN 91-37-12227-4
- Amerikanske guder (Norwegian), ISBN 978-82-93059-50-9
- Amerikanske guder (Danish), ISBN 978-87-71375-44-2
- 美國眾神 (Traditional Chinese), ISBN 978-986-7399-84-7, ISBN 9789863593492
- 美国众神 (Simplified Chinese), ISBN 978-753-6459-50-2, ISBN 978-7-5502-9714-2
- Ο Πόλεμος των Θεών (O Polemos ton Theon, "The War of the Gods") (Greek)
- American Gods (French), ISBN 978-2-290-33041-8
- Американски богове (Bulgarian), ISBN 954-585-519-3
- 신들의 전쟁 (상), 신들의 전쟁(하) (Korean), ISBN 978-89-6017-268-5, ISBN 978-89-6017-269-2
- Amerikaanse Goden (Dutch), ISBN 90-245-4261-8, ISBN 978-90-245-4261-1
- ამერიკელი ღმერთები (Georgian) ISBN 978-9941236631
- アメリカン・ゴッズ (Japanese), ISBN 978-4047916081, ISBN 978-4047916098
- Американские боги (Russian), ISBN 978-5170454716, ISBN 978-5971354659
- Американські боги (Ukrainian), ISBN 978-617-7498-66-6
- อเมริกัน ก็อดส์ (Thailand), ISBN 978-616-9187-39-4
