= Bruce Langley =

British actor (born 1992)

- Born: Benjamin Bruce J. Langley; 3 April 1992 (age 34); Colchester, Essex, England
- Education: University of Kent
- Occupation: Actor
- Years active: 2015–present

Bruce Langley (born 3 April 1992) is a British actor. He is known for playing Technical Boy on American Gods.

== Early life ==
Langley graduated with a First class Masters in Physical Actor Training and Performance in 2014 from the University of Kent.

== Career ==
Langley has received positive critical reception for his portrayal of Technical Boy on American Gods. The character of Technical Boy has been updated for the social media era from his portrayal in the book.

== Filmography ==
=== Film ===
Year	Title	Role	Notes
2015	Deadly Waters	Jake	
2018	Your Move	Max	

=== Television ===
Year	Title	Role	Notes
2017–2021	American Gods	Technical Boy	26 episodes
2023	The Great	Adult Paul	Episode: "Sweden"
