= Jesse Alexander =

American TV writer and producer

Jesse Alexander is an American television writer and producer. He was a co-executive producer and writer on Heroes. Originally from Santa Barbara, California, Alexander attended Sarah Lawrence College and AFI Conservatory. At Sarah Lawrence, he befriended J. J. Abrams, his collaborator on a number of projects.

Alexander became showrunner for American Gods starting with the second season, replacing Bryan Fuller and Michael Green. This was also his only season, replaced with Charles Eglee for season three.

== Filmography ==
=== Producer ===
- Heroes (as co-executive producer)
- Alias (as executive producer)
- Animated Alias: Tribunal (as executive producer)
- Lost (as executive consultant, co-executive producer)

=== Writer ===
- Star Trek: Discovery (as staff writer)
- Hannibal (as staff writer)
- Heroes (as staff writer)
- Alias (as staff writer)
- Eight Legged Freaks (2002) (as screenplay)
- Sgt. Fury and his Howling Commandos: Shotgun Opera (2009) (comic)
