= Demore Barnes =

Canadian actor (born 1976)

- Born: November 26, 1976 (age 49); Toronto, Ontario, Canada
- Occupation: Actor
- Years active: 1998–present

Demore Barnes (born November 26, 1976) is a Canadian actor. Barnes is best known for his roles as Sergeant First Class Hector Williams in the CBS military action television series The Unit, the archangel Raphael in Supernatural and Deputy Chief Christian Garland in Law & Order: Special Victims Unit.

Originally from Toronto, Barnes began his career with an appearance on the sketch comedy series Squawk Box on YTV. From there he joined the cast of Street Cents.

== Filmography ==
=== Film ===
Year	Title	Roles	Notes
1998	White Lies	Activist	
1999	If You Believe	Mark	Television film
2000	Steal This Movie	Student Leader	
2001	Blackout	Guy in Line	
2002	Second String	Waiter	
2003	Jasper, Texas	Ricky Horn	Television film
2011	Awakening	Simon	
2011	A Day Without Rain	Terrance	Short
2012	The Barrens	Deputy Ranger	
2013	The Cycle of Broken Grace	Paramedic #1	Short
2016	Jean of the Joneses	Michael Harrison	
2020	The Clark Sisters: First Ladies of Gospel	Elbert Clark	
2024	Twin Lies	Petersen	

=== Television ===
Year	Title	Roles	Notes
2000	Relic Hunter	Mudo	Episode: "The Legend of the Lost"
2001	Doc	Edmund	Episode: "The Art of Medicine"
2001–2002	The Associates	Benjamin Hardaway	30 episodes
2005	The Save-Ums!	Sal (voice)	Episode: "Tony and Sal's Treasure Hunt!"
2006–2009	The Unit	Hector Williams	45 episodes
2010	Fringe	Agent Hubert	Episode: "What Lies Below"
2009–2011	Supernatural	Raphael / Donnie Finnerman	3 episodes
2011	Being Erica	Michel Streith	Episode: "Osso Barko"
2011	Against the Wall	Paul Cosetti	Episode: "Boys Are Back"
2012	Flashpoint	Fred Camp	Episode: "We Take Care of Our Own"
2012	XIII: The Series	Martin Reynolds	9 episodes
2012	Transporter: The Series	Leon	Episode: "Hot Ice"
2013	Hannibal	Tobias Budge	2 episodes
2013	The Listener	Ryan Turner	Episode: "The Illustrated Woman"
2013	Covert Affairs	ER Doctor	Episode: "Hang Wire"
2013	Cracked	Idaris John / Melugo	1 episode
2015	Open Heart	Dr. Dominic Karamichaelidis	12 episodes
2015	Defiance	Dos	3 episodes
2015	Saving Hope	Aaron Davis	Episode: "Shine a Light"
2013–2015	Hemlock Grove	Michael Chasseur	11 episodes
2015–2016	The Flash	Henry Hewitt / Tokamak	3 episodes
2016	Incorporated	Mason	1 episode
2017	Chicago Justice	Marshall Matthews	1 episode
2017	Chicago Med	Marshall Matthews	1 episode
2018	Waco	Wayne Martin	6 episodes
2018	Ransom	Todd Kendall	Episode: "Anatomy of a Lost Cause"
2015–2018	12 Monkeys	Whitley	24 episodes
2019	Suits	Lucas Hodges	Episode: "Special Master"
2019	Titans	William Wintergreen	5 episodes
2017–2021	American Gods	Mr. Ibis	17 episodes
2019–2022	Law & Order: Special Victims Unit	Christian Garland	Recurring (season 21), main (season 22–23), guest (season 23); 25 episodes
2021	Law & Order: Organized Crime	Christian Garland	Episode: "An Inferior Product"
2025–2026	Doc	Randy Coleman	4 episodes
2026	Boston Blue	Franklin Beaumont	1 episode
2026	Star Trek: Strange New Worlds	Kor	1 episode

=== Video games ===
Year	Title	Voice role	Notes
2013	Splinter Cell: Blacklist	English American Soldier 4	
2015	Tom Clancy's Rainbow Six Siege	Capitão	
2022	Tom Clancy's Rainbow Six Extraction	Capitão	
