= Omid Abtahi =

American actor

- امید ابطحی
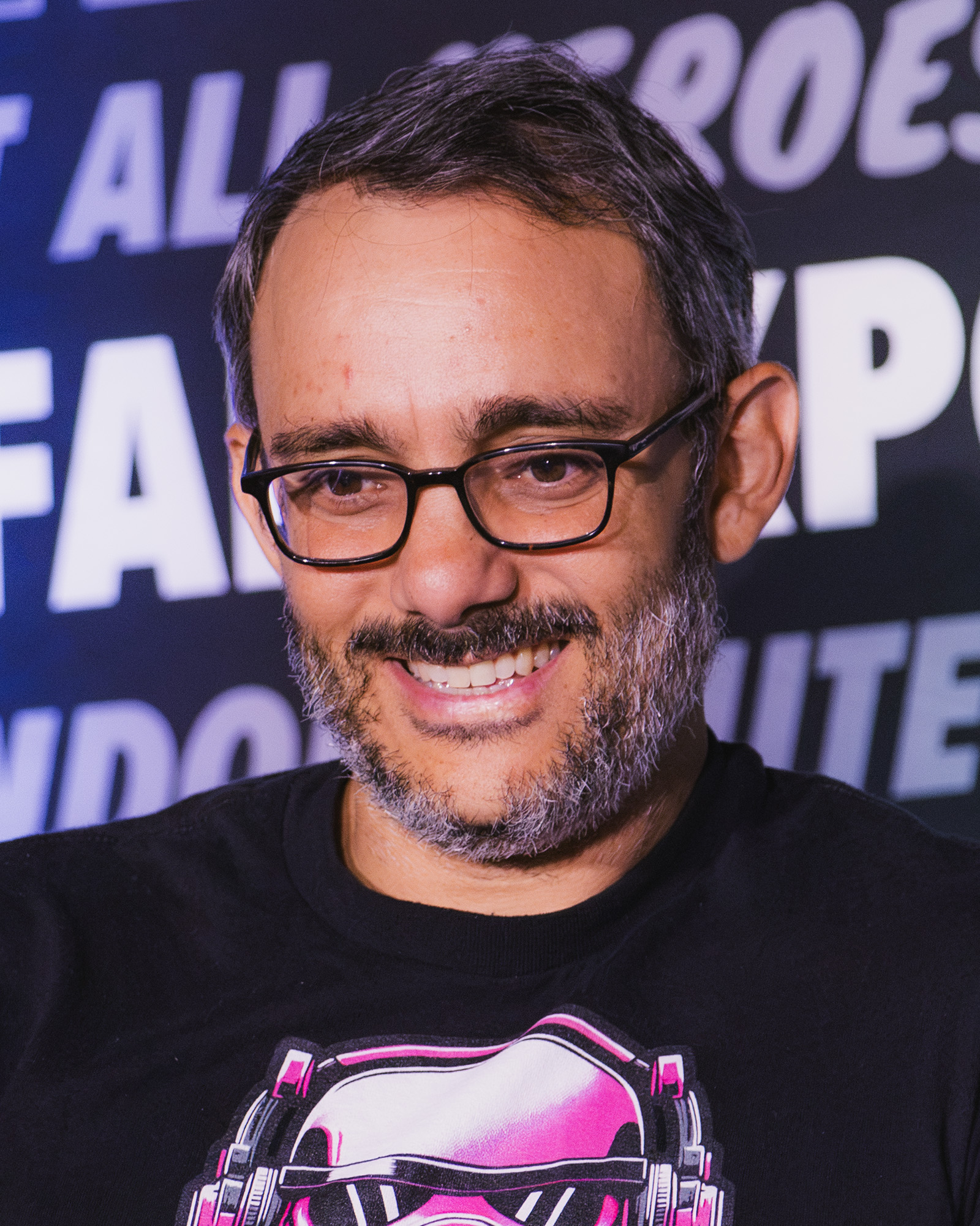
- Abtahi in 2026
- Born: July 12, 1979 (age 47); Tehran, Iran
- Education: California State University Fullerton
- Occupation: Actor
- Years active: 2005–present

Omid Abtahi (Persian: امید ابطحی; born July 12, 1979) is an Iranian-born American actor. He is best known for his roles as Salim in the Starz original American Gods, Penn Pershing in The Mandalorian, Saleem Ulman in NCIS, and Homes in The Hunger Games: Mockingjay – Part 2 (2015). He is also known for his performances as Justin Yates in Ghost Whisperer and as Detective Jerry Molbeck in the American TV adaptation of Those Who Kill.

== Early life and education ==
Omid Abtahi was born on July 12, 1979 in Tehran, Iran. At the age of five, he moved to Paris with his family, before again relocating to the United States, to Irvine, Orange County, California, when he was 10.

Abtahi graduated from University High School, Irvine, in 1997, and attended California State University, Fullerton. He began studying advertising, then picked up a second major in theater, graduating in 2002.

== Career ==
Prior to appearing on television, Abtahi performed with several theater companies, starring in a stage production of Arthur Schnitzler's Fräulein Else at the Berkeley Repertory, McCarter Theatre and Long Wharf Theatre; Adoration of the Old Woman at the Sundance Theatre Lab; and Your Everyday Typical Romantic Comedy at the Kennedy Center.

After arriving in Los Angeles, Abtahi was a series regular on FX's Over There and Showtime's Sleeper Cell, both premiering in 2005.

He has also guest-starred on the television series JAG, Judging Amy, and 24. He played Justin Yates in Ghost Whisperer.

Abtahi made his New York City stage debut in Urge for Going by Mona Mansour in January 2016.

He has also been a voice actor in video games, playing the role of Farid in Call of Duty: Black Ops II and Sergeant John Lugo in Spec Ops: The Line. He also voices Victor "Gator" Diallo in Call of Duty: Infinite Warfare.

== Filmography ==
=== Feature film ===
Year	Film	Role	Notes
2006	Running with Scissors	Restaurant Manager	
2008	The Mysteries of Pittsburgh	Mohammed	
2008	Ocean of Pearls	Amrit Singh	
2008	The Last Lullaby	Van	
2008	Space Chimps	Dr. Jagu (voice)	
2009	Brothers	Yusuf	
2010	Space Chimps 2: Zartog Strikes Back	Dr. Jagu / Reporter #2 (voice)	Direct-to-video
2012	Argo	Reza	
2014	Boys of Abu Ghraib	Ghazi Hammoud	
2015	The Hunger Games: Mockingjay – Part 2	Homes	
2016	Window Horses	Ramin (voice)	
2021	Justice Society: World War II	Hawkman (voice)	Direct-to-video

=== Short film ===
Year	Film	Role	Notes
2009	Not Necessary	Larry Dallas	
2009	Diplomacy	American Interpreter	
2009	Stars	The Pimp	
2010	An Idle Dream	Pascal	
2011	The Perfect Meal	Social Worker (voice)	
2018	Goliath 22	Omar	

=== Television ===
Key
†	Denotes television programs that have not yet aired.

Year	Film	Role	Notes
2005	JAG	Wahid	Episode: "Heart of Darkness"
2005	Judging Amy	Reza Ajami	Episode: "The New Normal"
2005	Over There	Pfc. Tariq Nassiri	12 episodes
2005–2009	24	Safa / Jibraan Al-Zarian	4 episodes
2006	Sleeper Cell	Salim	7 episodes
2007	CSI: Crime Scene Investigation	Chandru 'Dru' Kambhatla	Episode: "The Good, the Bad and the Dominatrix"
2007	The Unit	The Boss	Episode: "Play 16"
2007–2008	Ghost Whisperer	Justin Yates	3 episodes
2008	Terminator: The Sarah Connor Chronicles	Sumner	Episode: "Gnothi Seauton"
2008	Eli Stone	Amir Khan	Episode: "Should I Stay or Should I Go?"
2008	My Own Worst Enemy	Tony Nazari	9 episodes
2009	Can Openers	Ali	TV movie
2009	Bones	Hal Shirazi	Episode: "The Bones That Foam"
2009	NCIS	Saleem Ulman	2 episodes
2009–2010	FlashForward	Ed Fiore	2 episodes
2009–2010	Three Rivers	Dr. Yousef Khouri	2 episodes
2010	Pleading Guilty	Jonathan Ziven	TV movie
2010	The Event	William	2 episodes
2010	Nikita	Amir Komera	Episode: "Resistance"
2010	The Mentalist	Markham Shankar	Episode: "Red Hot"
2010	Grey's Anatomy	Aasif	Episode: "Something's Gotta Give"
2010–2013	Star Wars: The Clone Wars	Cadet Amis (voice)	2 episodes
2011	Fringe	Simon Phillips	Episode: "Concentrate and Ask Again"
2011	Homeland	Raqim Faisel	3 episodes
2011	Hide	Neil	TV movie
2012	The Good Wife	Samir	Episode: "Live from Damascus"
2012	Family Guy	Prince Faisal (voice)	Episode: "Leggo My Meg-O"
2012	Covert Affairs	Sayid al-Muqri	Episode: "Hello Stranger"
2012–2013	Last Resort	Nigel	5 episodes
2013	Family Guy	Mahmoud (voice)	Episode: "Turban Cowboy"
2013	Castle	Waqas Rasheed	Episode: "Dreamworld"
2013	NCIS: Los Angeles	Ari Sayed	2 episodes
2013	Revolution	Captain Riley	2 episodes
2014	Legends	Bashir Al-Kanazer	2 episodes
2014	Those Who Kill	Detective Jerry Molbeck	10 episodes
2015	Better Call Saul	Detective Abbasi	3 episodes
2016	Damien	Amani Golker	10 episodes
2017	Shameless	Sameer	Episode: "Frank's Northern Southern Express"
2017	Hawaii Five-0	Naser Salaam	Episode: "He ke'u na ka 'alae a Hina"
2017–2021	American Gods	Salim	21 episodes
2018	The Crossing	Jake	2 episodes
2018	We Bare Bears	Kale (voice)	Episode: "The Limo"
2019	Love, Death & Robots	Wes (voice)	Episode: "Sonnie's Edge"
2019	DuckTales	Faris D'jinn (voice)	2 episodes; replacing the late Richard Libertini
2019–2023	The Mandalorian	Penn Pershing	5 episodes
2021–2022	Fear the Walking Dead	Howard	8 episodes
2021	The Lost Symbol	Inmate	Episode: "As Above, So Below"
2022–2023	Kung Fu Panda: The Dragon Knight	Alfie (voice)	4 episodes
2023	Moon Girl and Devil Dinosaur	Ahmed (voice)	4 episodes
2023	City on Fire	Detective Ali Parsa	8 episodes
2024–2026	The Boys	Sameer Shah	5 episodes
2025	FBI	Faheem Ellahi	Episode: "Redoubt"
2027	One Piece	Toto	

=== Video games ===
Year	Film	Role	Notes
2012	Diablo III	Additional Voices	
2012	Unit 13	Informant 1	
2012	Spec Ops: The Line	Staff Sergeant John Lugo	
2012	Call of Duty: Black Ops II	Farid, Mujahideen Soldier	
2015	Call of Duty: Black Ops III	Additional Voices	
2016	Titanfall 2	Militia Captain	
2016	1979 Revolution: Black Friday	Babak Azadi	
2016	Mafia III	Additional Voices	
2016	Call of Duty: Infinite Warfare	Victor 'Gator' Diallo	
2018	Thief of Thieves	Corbin "Chip" Tavistock	
2019	Metro Exodus	Cannibal, Child of the Forest	
2019	Days Gone	Additional Voices	
2019	Rage 2	Miscellaneous Voices	
2019	Call of Duty: Modern Warfare	Additional Voice	
2020	Disintegration	Ox-eye, Outlaw, Redshirt	
2021	The Artful Escape	Talish, Hyperionite 3	
