= A Different World (2026 TV series) =

American sitcom

- Genre: Sitcom
- Created by: Felicia Pride
- Based on: A Different World by Bill Cosby
- Showrunner: Felicia Pride
- Starring: Maleah Joi Moon; Alijah Kai; Cornell Young IV; Jordan Aaron Hall; Kennedi Reece; Chibuikem Uche
- Opening theme: Performed by: Brandy Norwood
- Country of origin: United States
- Original language: English
- No. of seasons: 1
- No. of episodes: 10

Production
- Executive producers: Debbie Allen; Felicia Pride; Reggie Rock Bythewood; Gina Prince-Bythewood; Mandy Summers; Tom Werner
- Camera setup: Single-camera
- Production companies: Honey Chile Entertainment; Undisputed Cinema; The Carsey-Werner Company

Original release
- Network: Netflix
- Release: September 24, 2026 – present

Related
- The Cosby Show; A Different World

A Different World is an American comedy television series and a revival of the 1987–1993 NBC sitcom of the same title. The series stars Maleah Joi Moon, with Jasmine Guy and Kadeem Hardison reprising their roles from the original series billed as "special guest stars" alongside many other returning actors. It premiered on Netflix on September 24, 2026, exactly 39 years from the original series premiere date. It received positive reviews from critics. In October 2026, the series was renewed for a second season.

== Premise ==
When Dwayne Wayne and Whitley Gilbert-Wayne's free-spirited and kindhearted, yet rebellious youngest child Deborah enters her freshman year at Hillman College, she finds her parents' shadow difficult to escape as she aims to build her own legacy. She does that while also exploring new freedoms as a part of the new generation of Hillman's finest and brightest.

== Cast and characters ==
=== Main ===
- Maleah Joi Moon as Deborah Wayne
- Alijah Kai as Rashida Duvall
- Cornell Young IV as Shaquille Johnson
- Jordan Aaron Hall as Amir Rodale
- Kennedi Reece as Hazel Henry
- Chibuikem Uche as Kojo Achebe

=== Special guest ===
- Jasmine Guy as Whitley Gilbert-Wayne
- Kadeem Hardison as Dwayne Wayne
- Darryl M. Bell as Ron Johnson
- Cree Summer as Freddie Brooks

=== Recurring ===
- Ajai Sanders as Gina Deveaux
- Karen Malina White as Charmaine Brown
- Charnele Brown as Dr. Kimberly Reese Boyer
- Jenifer Lewis as Professor Davenport
- Dawnn Lewis as Jaleesa Vinson-Taylor
- Glynn Turman as Colonel Bradford Taylor
- Jada Pinkett Smith as Congresswoman Lena James
- Cliff "Method Man" Smith as Coach Coles
- Norman Nixon Jr. as Professor Baptiste
- Vincent Jamal Hooper as Ellington Kendall
- Elijah J. Roberts as Jalen
- Renee Harrison as Candace
- Famecia Ward as Nellie Gaines
- Dasan Frazier as Xavier
- Tichina Arnold as Darlene Duvall
- Joshua Suiter as Andre
- Raven Goodwin as Dr. Brooklyn Boyer
- Imani Guy Duckette as Teedra

== Episodes ==
No.	Title	Directed by	Written by	Original release date
1	"Irreconcilable Differences"	Debbie Allen	Felicia Pride	September 24, 2026
Deborah Wayne, the youngest daughter of Dwayne Wayne and Whitley Gilbert-Wayne, begins her freshman year at Hillman College, following in her parents' footsteps. She moves in with her new roommate and begins meeting the students who will become her core group of friends. Her attempt at starting fresh is complicated when she discovers that Shaquille, an old boyfriend, is also at Hillman. Deborah also quickly learns that being Dwayne and Whitley's daughter means people already have expectations of her before she's had a chance to establish herself.
2	"O Captain! My Captain!"	Tiffany Johnson	Des Moran	September 24, 2026
Deborah gets herself into trouble after openly expressing her opinion and finds herself being called out publicly on campus. Rashida, struggling financially, looks for ways to make extra money while keeping up with college. Meanwhile, Shaquille prepares for his first Hillman football game, but the game doesn't go the way he expected. The episode starts showing the different pressures facing the group: Deborah's reputation, Rashida's finances and Shaquille's athletic expectations.
3	"Center de Stage"	Angela Barnes	Lisa McQuillan	September 24, 2026
It's Homecoming weekend, bringing a number of Hillman alumni back to campus. Deborah becomes caught up in trying to secure a headlining performer for the Homecoming festivities. Dwayne and Whitley return to Hillman, but it becomes increasingly obvious that there are serious tensions in their marriage. Their problems begin affecting Deborah at the same time she's trying to manage her own increasingly complicated college life.
4	"Those Who Can...Cuff"	Angela Barnes	Howard Jordan Jr.	September 24, 2026
“Cuffing season” arrives at Hillman and the students' romantic relationships start becoming considerably messier. Dates and hookups intersect with academic pressure and financial problems. Deborah's romantic situation becomes increasingly complicated, while the relationships among the rest of the friend group begin shifting as well.
5	"Final Words"	Tiffany Johnson	Rashida Olayiwola	September 24, 2026
Final exams begin and Deborah and the entire group are overwhelmed by academic pressure. Different members of the group struggle with the expectations being placed on them and the possibility that they won't perform as well as they hoped. A more serious crisis then interrupts the finals panic and forces everyone to reconsider what they're worrying about and what actually matters.
6	"Insomnia and the Daydreamer"	Tiffany Johnson	Des Moran & Ashley Laverne Jackson	September 24, 2026
Deborah starts questioning whether the man she's been imagining as her ideal partner is actually right for her. Her unresolved feelings and romantic options become increasingly difficult to ignore. Meanwhile, the students go out for a night at a club, only for the evening to become chaotic when the aunties unexpectedly arrive. The resulting night mixes the younger characters' romantic drama with interference from the older generation.
7	"Sometimes You Get the Culture...Sometimes the Culture Gets You"	Nefertite Nguvu	Howard Jordan Jr., Tasha Armstead, Joel Armstead	September 24, 2026
Hillman holds its end-of-year talent show, where Deborah and Kojo set out to prove people who doubted them wrong. Kojo also finds himself caught up in arguments surrounding African/diaspora identity and culture. Hazel competes for Miss Gilbert Hall, giving her a chance to establish herself on campus. At the same time, the students deal with issues surrounding sexual health and relationships.
8	"I Choose Chaos"	Nefertite Nguvu	Felicia Pride & Des Moran	September 24, 2026
A tornado warning traps the students inside, meaning several people who have been avoiding difficult conversations can no longer get away from each other. Hazel and Amir are forced to confront their ongoing conflict. Deborah and Shaquille finally discuss their original breakup, revealing more about what went wrong between them before Hillman. Their conversation also makes it increasingly difficult for Deborah to pretend that her feelings for Shaquille are entirely in the past.
9	"Romancing the Unknown"	Bille Woodruff	Lisa McQuillan	September 24, 2026
The situation at Hillman becomes much more serious when the college's budget crisis erupts. Deborah and her friends decide they aren't simply going to sit back and watch what happens and begin taking action themselves. At the same time, the long-running problems between Dwayne and Whitley come to a head, putting Deborah in the middle of a major family conflict while she's also becoming involved in the fight over Hillman's future.
10	"A Gift & The Curse"	Bille Woodruff	Felicia Pride	September 24, 2026
The end-of-year gala brings the various storylines together as Hillman's financial problems, the students' relationships and Deborah's family situation reach their respective breaking points. The students' response to the Hillman crisis puts Deborah in an increasingly active role in campus affairs, while major decisions are made about the college's future. Relationships that have developed throughout the year are forced to either move forward or fall apart, and Deborah faces a major decision in her own love life. The finale also establishes a new chapter for Hillman and leaves several characters facing very different futures going into their next year.

== Production ==
=== Development ===
On August 23 and 24, 2012, Debbie Allen wrote on Twitter that she wanted to reboot the series. Over a million people on Facebook, Twitter, and blogs reacted to the tweet and approved of the potential reboot.

On August 7, 2024, Deadline reported that a sequel to the series was in the works at Netflix: a single-camera half-hour comedy focusing on original cast characters Whitley & Dwayne's daughter, who also attends Hillman College. Deadline indicated that the series would be written and produced by Felicia Pride, who has worked on Bel-Air and Grey's Anatomy, and that Debbie Allen would be an executive producer, along with Mandy Summers, Tom Werner, Gina Prince-Bythewood and Reggie Bythewood. On March 28, 2025, Netflix ordered a pilot of the sequel series. On October 2, 2026, Netflix renewed the show for a second season.

=== Filming ===
Production was delayed by the COVID-19 pandemic. Principal photography began in Atlanta in February 2026 and wrapped in May 2026.

== Music ==
Brandy performed the theme song.

== Release ==
The series premiered on Netflix on September 24, 2026.

The official trailer for the series premiered on August 17, 2026.

== Reception ==
The review aggregator website Rotten Tomatoes reported a 82% approval rating based on 22 critic reviews. The website's critics consensus reads, "This revived continuation of a beloved classic follows new characters through the lens of Gen-Z, crackling with energy, strutting with style, and written with full-hearted verve, proving that A Different World isn't such a bad thing after all." Metacritic, which uses a weighted average, assigned a score of 72 out of 100, based on 13 critics, indicating "generally favorable" reviews.
