= MDMA (disambiguation) =

MDMA is a psychoactive drug, commonly known as the recreational drug Ecstasy.

MDMA may also refer to:

- MDMA (film), an American crime drama film
- "MDMA", a 2021 song produced by Swedish musician AronChupa
- "MDMA", a song by Ken Carson from his 2022 album X
