= Try Me (Jasmine Guy song) =

Single by Jasmine Guy

from the album Jasmine Guy
- B-side: "Just Want to Hold You"
- Released: September 28, 1990
- Recorded: June 1990
- Genre: New jack swing
- Length: 4:56
- Label: Warner Bros.
- Songwriters: Curt Bedeau, Gerry Charles, Hugh L Clarke, Brian George, Lucien George, Paul George
- Producer: Full Force

Jasmine Guy singles chronology
"Try Me" (1990)	"Another Like My Lover" (1991)

"Try Me" is a song by American singer and actress Jasmine Guy, released on September 28, 1990. The song was written and produced by Full Force, and features background vocals by female group Ex Girlfriend. The song is the first single from her debut studio album, Jasmine Guy released on Warner Bros. Records. The song was a top 20 hit on the Billboard Hot R&B Singles chart in December 1990.

Guy performed the song on an episode of Soul Train which aired on November 17, 1990. The extended version is heard in the background of the party on the episode "Good Help is So Hard to Fire" of A Different World.

== Music video ==
To date, there are two versions known. One has a party scene where there is a dance-off between her and her rival over a guy at the party. The other version is a photo shoot scene, and a scene where Guy is dancing behind background dancers.

== Track listings and formats ==
- US 7" vinyl single

A. "Try Me" (Edit) – 3:58
B. "Just Want to Hold You" (Album Version) – 4:09

- US 12" vinyl single

A1. "Try Me" (Special Slammin' Remix) – 6:01
B1. "Try Me" (Special Slammin' Remix Edit) – 4:20
B2. "Try Me" (Extended Version) – 6:01

- US Cassette single

A. "Try Me" (Edit) – 3:59
B. "Try Me" (Album Version) – 4:56

- Japan CD mini single
1. "Try Me" – 4:56
2. "Another Like My Lover" – 4:24

== Credits ==
- Producer, Writer, Arrangement – Full Force
- Executive-Producer – Jasmine Guy, Leonard Richardson
- Vocals – Jasmine Guy
- Backing Vocals – Ex-Girlfriend
- Remix Additional Production – Full Force
- Engineer – Buzz Burrowes, Pete Diorio
- Mixed – Full Force, Peter Diorio
- Mastered – Eddy Schreyer

== Charts ==
Chart (1990)	Peak position
US Hot R&B/Hip-Hop Songs (Billboard)	14
