= Cal Harris Jr. =

American musician

- Genres: contemporary jazz, smooth jazz
- Instrument(s): keyboards, trumpet
- Labels: CHI International, Innervision Records

Cal Harris Jr. is an American contemporary jazz artist, producer, audio engineer, songwriter, and composer. In 2018 Cal Harris was ranked the #5 smooth jazz artist by Billboard. He has toured with Prince, Lenny Kravitz, Boyz II Men, Earth Wind and Fire, Pharrell Williams, Il Divo, Cirque du Soleil (Delirium), Whitney Houston, Babyface, and Kenny Loggins. Harris has worked as a recording engineer for Paula Abdul, Selena, Lenny Kravitz, as well as Earth Wind and Fire. He has also performed as a keyboard player for Con Funk Shun, Jonny Gill, and Lenny Kravitz. In 1990 Harris co-wrote the hit single "Just Want to Hold You" by Jasmine Guy. He also became one of the twenty finalists for American Idol's season 6 songwriter competition, beating out over 25,000 other submissions.

== Early life ==
At a young age Cal Harris Jr. was exposed to Motown legends since his father, Cal Harris Sr, worked as a recording engineer for Motown. He grew up seeing his father work with artists such as Marvin Gaye, Diana Ross, and the Jackson 5. He learned to play instruments and record music at a young age which inspired him to become a musician later in life.

== Discography ==
=== Solo albums ===
- Inside Out (2010)
- Shelter Island (2014)
- Soulful (2019)

=== Singles ===
- "Airborne" (2015)
- "Endless Summer" (2016)
- "Soulful" (2017)
- "Timeline" (2018)
- "The Touch" (2019)
- "Ordinary Days" (2021)
- "Bridges" (2021)

=== Audio engineer ===
- "It Will Never End" - Eternal (1995)
- "Make It Right" - Jordan Hill (1995)
- "If I were Your Girl" - Paula Abdul (1995)
- "I'm Getting Used to You" - Selena (1995)
- It Is Time For A Love Revolution - Lenny Kravitz (2008)

=== Writing ===
- "Just Want to Hold You" - Jasmine Guy (1990)

== Charts ==
List of charting singles, with Smooth Jazz Airplay chart positions and dates
Title	Details	Peak chart positions
Title	Details	US Jazz
"Smooth"	Released: April 6, 2013; Label: CHI International; Format: Digital download, CD	10
"By the Bay"	Released: July 29, 2013; Label: CHI International; Format: Digital download, CD	22
"Shelter Island"	Released: May 17, 2014; Label: CHI International; Format: Digital download, CD	11
"Wave Rider"	Released: January 17, 2015; Label: CHI International; Format: Digital download, CD	28
"Soulful"	Released: April 28, 2018; Label: Innervision; Format: Digital download, CD	3
"Timeline"	Released: November 3, 2018; Label: Innervision; Format: Digital download, CD	2
"The Neighborhood"	Released: October 19, 2019; Label: Innervision; Format: Digital download, CD	22
