= What We Found =

What We Found may refer to:

- What We Found (short story), a 2011 science fiction novelette by Geoff Ryman
- What We Found (film), a 2020 American thriller film
