= Another Like My Lover =

Single by Jasmine Guy

from the album Jasmine Guy
- Released: January 20, 1991
- Recorded: August 1990
- Genre: R&B, new jack swing
- Length: 4:10
- Label: Warner Bros.
- Songwriters: Timmy Gatling, Alton "Wokie" Stewart
- Producer: Timmy Gatling

Jasmine Guy singles chronology
"Try Me" (1990)	"Another Like My Lover" (1991)	"Just Want to Hold You" (1991)

"Another Like My Lover" is a song by American singer and actress Jasmine Guy, released on January 20, 1991 by Warner Bros. Records, as the second single from her only and self-titled debut album (1990). The song was a top-ten hit on the US Billboard Hot R&B Singles chart and peaked at numbers 66 and 81 on the Billboard Hot 100 and Cash Box Top 100 charts.

== Track listings and formats ==
- US 12" vinyl single

A1. "Another Like My Lover" (Hip Hop Club Mix) – 5:45
A2. "Another Like My Lover" (East Coast Boom Club Mix) – 5:45
A3. "Another Like My Lover" (Club Dub 1) – 5:26
A4. "Another Like My Lover" (Club Dub 2) – 5:22
B1. "Another Like My Lover" (Cold Weather Mix) – 4:28
B2. "Another Like My Lover" (Cold Weather Bonus Dub) – 6:58
B3. "Another Like My Lover" (Extended Mix) – 5:01
B4. "Another Like My Lover" (Percussapella) – 5:01

- US Cassette single

A. "Another Like My Lover" (Single version) – 4:24
B. "Another Like My Lover" (Instrumental) – 5:00

- US CD single
1. "Another Like My Lover" (Single version) – 4:02
2. "Another Like My Lover" (Alternate Version – 4:20
3. "Another Like My Lover" (Alternate Album Version) – 4:42
4. "Another Like My Lover" (Instrumental) – 5:00

== Credits ==
- Executive-Producer – Jasmine Guy, Leonard Richardson
- Vocals – Jasmine Guy
- Backing Vocals – Jasmine Guy, Timmy Gatling
- Writer – Alton 'Wokie' Stewart
- Producer, Keyboards, Writer – Timmy Gatling
- Remix Production, Mixed – Jon Gass (tracks: B3, B4)
- Remix Production, Engineer – Greg Royal (tracks: B1, B2)
- Engineer – Donnell Sullivan

== Charts ==
Chart (1991)	Peak position
US Billboard Hot 100	66
US Hot R&B/Hip-Hop Songs (Billboard)	9
US Cash Box Top 100	81
