= Jasmine Guy (album) =

Studio album by Jasmine Guy
- Released: October 16, 1990
- Recorded: 1990
- Studios: M'Bila Studios, Oliver Leiber's House, The Hit Factory, Paisley Park, Unique Recording, JHL Studios, Studio 56, Aire L.A. Studios, Science Lab, Alchemy Recording Studios, Wings West Recording
- Genres: R&B; pop; new jack swing
- Length: 45:32
- Label: Warner Bros.
- Producers: Full Force; Timmy Gatling; Oliver Leiber; Rex Salas; Donald Robinson; Mic Murphy; Raymond C. Jones; D.J. Eddie F.; Nevelle Hodge

Singles from Jasmine Guy
- 1. "Try Me" Released: September 28, 1990; 2. "Another Like My Lover" Released: January 20, 1991; 3. "Just Want to Hold You" Released: May 2, 1991

Jasmine Guy is the only studio album by American actress-singer Jasmine Guy, released in October 1990 on Warner Bros. Records. The album peaked at No. 143 on the Billboard 200 and 38 on Top R&B Albums chart.

The singles, "Another Like My Lover", "Try Me" and "Just Want to Hold You", were top 40 hits on Billboard's Hot R&B Singles chart. Although the album was an overall success, plans for a follow-up release were terminated when Guy and Warner Bros. Records ended their three-year relationship in 1993.

== Track listing ==
No.	Title	Writer(s)	{{{extra_column}}}	Length
1.	"Try Me"	Full Force	Writer(s)	4:56
2.	"Another Like My Lover"	Alton Stewart; Timmy Gatling		4:10
3.	"Don't Want Money"	Oliver Leiber; St. Paul		4:03
4.	"Johnny Come Lately"	Amir Bayan; James Woodley		4:48
5.	"More Love"	Peter Brown; Rodney Saulsberry; Steve Lane		4:50
6.	"Tuff Boy"	Leiber		4:27
7.	"Everybody Knows My Name"	Cree Summer; Jasmine Guy; Nevelle Hodge		5:00
8.	"Just Want to Hold You" (featuring James Ingram)	Cal Harris Jr.; Melanie Andrews; Tony Andrews		4:10
9.	"I Don't Have To Justify"	Keith Eaddy; Mic Murphy		4:23
10.	"I Wish You Well"	Raymond Jones		4:45

== Personnel and Production ==
- Tracks 1 and 4 written, arranged and produced by Full Force. Track 1 recorded by Buzz Burrowes and Pete Diorio; mixed by Full Force and Pete Diorio. Track 3 recorded by Paul Logus and Tony Maserati. All instruments and programming by Full Force; backing vocals on track 1 by Ex-Girlfriend; backing vocals on track 3 by Cheryl Riley, Full Force and Jimmy Damski.
- Track 2 arranged and produced by Timmy Gatling. Recorded and mixed by Mitch Gibson. All instruments by Scott Weatherspoon, with additional keyboards and backing vocals by Timmy Gatling. Backing vocals and backing vocal arrangements by Jasmine Guy.
- Tracks 3 and 6 arranged and produced by Oliver Leiber. Track 3 engineered by Chopper Bock, Peter Martinsen, Tom Garneau and Tom Tucker, with assistance by John Chamberlin; mixed by Alan Meyerson. Track 6 engineered by David Gamson, Jeff Lorber and Peter Martinsen; mixed by Alan Meyerson. Oliver Leiber: Guitars, keyboards and drum programming on both tracks, with track 3 rap by Derrick "Delite" Steven.
- Track 5 arranged and produced by Donald Robinson. Engineered and mixed by Al Alberts and David Amlin, with recording assistance by Carl Angstadt. David Robinson: Keyboards; Saxophone: Branford Marsalis; Bass: Marcus Miller; Jim Salamone: Drums and drum programming.
- Track 7 arranged and produced by DJ Eddie F., Nevelle and The Untouchables. Engineered and mixed by Booker T. Jones III and Mark Paris.
- Track 8 arranged and produced by Rex Salas; engineered by Dave Koenig and Rob Seifert. Mixed by Dave Koenig. Rex Salas, Chuckii Booker: Keyboards; Thomas Organ: Guitars; Darron Williams: Synthesized Bass; Derek Organ: Drum overdubs; Fred White, Jasmine Guy, Phillip Ingram and Valerie Pinkston: Backing Vocals
- Track 9 arranged and produced by Mic Murphy. Engineered by Stephen Seltzer, with assistance by Julian Briottet; vocals recorded by John K. Hegedes. Mixed by Dennis Mitchell, with assistance by Leroy Quintyn. Mic Murphy: Keyboards and drum programming
- Track 10 arranged and produced by Raymond Jones. Recorded and mixed by Booker T. Jones III, Khaliq Glover and Raymond Jones, with assistance by Jack Curtis Dubowski and Linda Morse. Raymond Jones: Keyboards, drum programming, backing vocals; Randy Hall: Guitars, backing vocals; Cornelius Mims: Bass; Cree Summer, Jasmine Guy, Jeffrey Osborne, Kenny Harris, Kenny Jones and Kenny Jones.

== Charts ==
Chart (1990)	Peak position
US Billboard 200	143
US Top R&B/Hip-Hop Albums (Billboard)	38
US Heatseekers Albums (Billboard)	32

=== Singles ===
Year	Title	Peak position	
Year	Title	U.S. Pop	U.S. R&B
1990	"Try Me"	—	14
1991	"Another Like My Lover"	66	6
1991	"Just Want to Hold You" (with James Ingram)	34	27
1991	"Don't Want Money"	—	—
