= Cornell Young IV =

American actor (born 2000)

- Born: February 14, 2000 (age 26); Kirkwood, Missouri, U.S
- Occupation: Actor
- Years active: 2025–present

Cornell Young IV (born February 14, 2000) is an American actor. He gained recognition for portraying Shaquille Johnson in A Different World (2026).

== Early life ==
Young IV was born to Shonte (née Harmon) and Cornell Young III on February 14, 2000, in Kirkwood, Missouri, United States. He was raised in St. Louis as one of seven children. Young IV has a twin brother, David Vann, who is not his identical twin, and four sisters. He is African American with reported Native American ancestry.

Young IV attended Kirkwood High School, where he played American football as a running back, cornerback and wide receiver, and was part of the team that won the Missouri state championship in Class 6A. He continued his football career in college, first at Westminster College and later at McKendree University, where he played as a wide receiver wearing number 14. While at McKendree, he studied marketing and became involved in university theatre.

== Career ==
Young IV made his television debut when he appeared as Jameel in one episode of Mind Your Business, as Todd in two episodes of Forever, and as Photographer in two episodes of Beyond the Gates.

In 2026, Young IV appeared as Darius in one episode of Dream House, as Maurice 'Mac Machine Mo' Jackson in two episodes of D.O.P.E. Unit, and Shaquille Johnson in 10 episodes of A Different World. He appeared as Donovan in the Tyler Perry drama film Doing Life.

== Filmography ==
=== Film ===
Key
†	Denotes productions that have not yet been released

List of Cornell Young IV film credits
Year	Title	Role	Notes
2026	Doing Life	Donovan	
TBA	The Conversion †	Israel Coleman	Short; post-production

=== Television ===
List of Cornell Young IV television credits
Year	Title	Role	Notes
2025	Mind Your Business	Jameel	1 episode
2025	Forever	Todd	2 episodes
2025	Beyond the Gates	Photographer	2 episodes
2026	Dream House	Darius	1 episode
2026	D.O.P.E. Unit	Maurice 'Mac Machine Mo' Jackson	2 episodes
2026	A Different World	Shaquille Johnson	10 episodes
