= Kadeem Hardison =

American actor (born 1965)

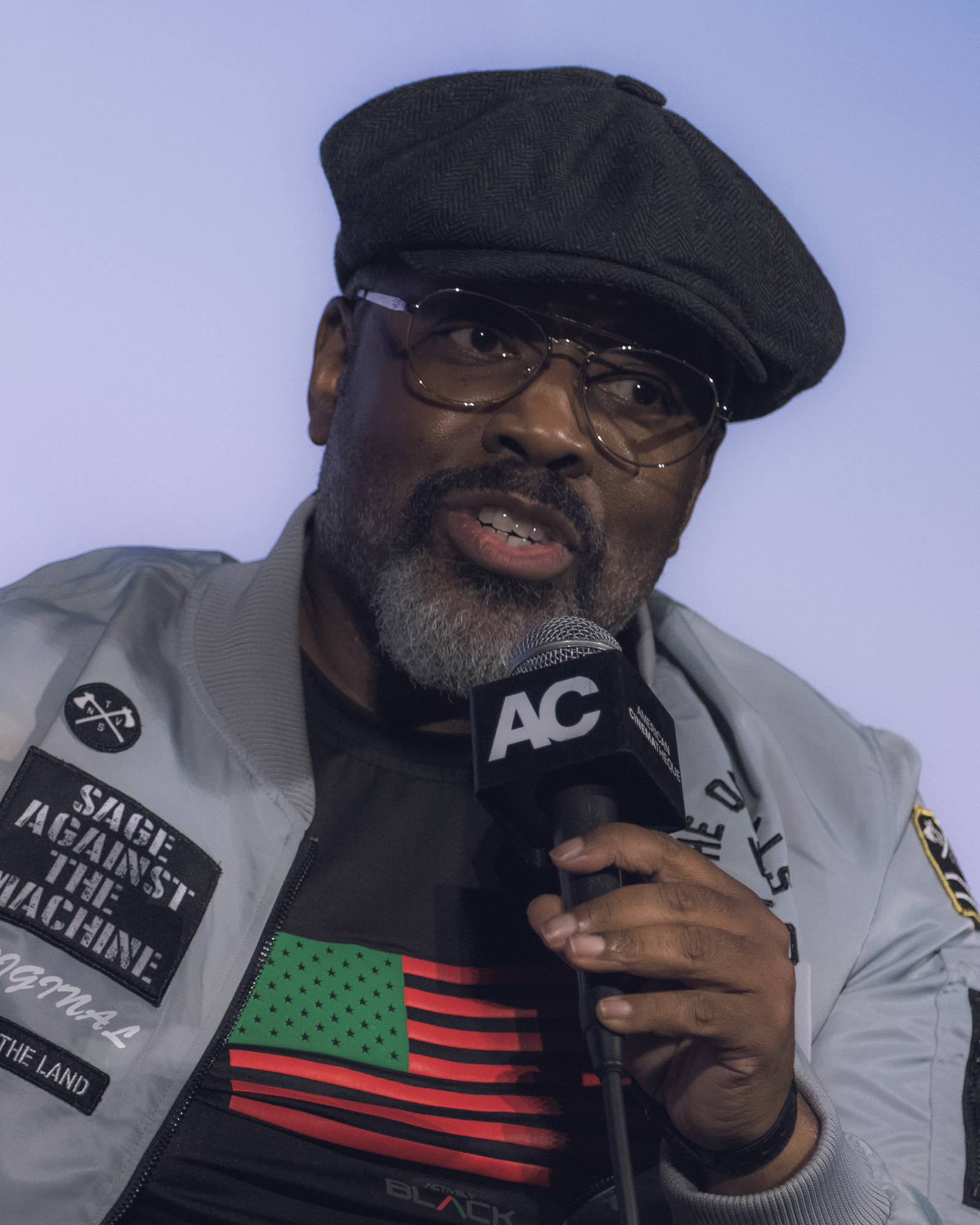
- Hardison in 2025
- Born: July 24, 1965 (age 61); Brooklyn, New York City, U.S.
- Occupation: Actor
- Years active: 1981–present
- Known for: A Different World, The Cosby Show & K.C. Undercover
- Spouse: Chanté Moore (m. 1997; div. 2000)
- Children: 1

Kadeem Hardison (born July 24, 1965) is an American actor. The son of fashion model Bethann Hardison, he rose to prominence after landing the role of Dwayne Wayne on the television series A Different World, a spin-off of the NBC sitcom The Cosby Show. He reprised this role in the 2026 Netflix remake by the same name. Hardison is also known for playing Craig Cooper in the Disney Channel series K.C. Undercover, his portrayal of Bowser in the comedy drama series Teenage Bounty Hunters, and for appearing in the first season of the Showtime comedy Black Monday.

== Early life ==
Hardison was born in Bedford–Stuyvesant, Brooklyn, New York, the only child of Donald McFadden, an antique and fine art collector, and Bethann Hardison, a pioneering African-American runway model and advocate for diversity in the fashion industry.

== Career ==
Hardison was a starring cast member on the sitcom A Different World as Dwayne Wayne, and a regular cast member of K.C. Undercover and the short-lived sitcoms Abby and Between Brothers. His career was managed predominantly by his mother, Bethann Hardison. He has also guest starred on several other sitcoms, including Living Single, Girlfriends, Under One Roof, The Boondocks (as himself), Greek, Parenthood, and on Everybody Hates Chris as the judge. His films include Escapee, Rappin', School Daze, Def by Temptation, Vampire in Brooklyn, 30 Years to Life, Made of Honor, The 6th Man, Drive, Renaissance Man, Panther, The Fantasia Barrino Story: Life Is Not a Fairy Tale, Bratz, Biker Boyz, Who's Your Daddy?, The Crow: Stairway to Heaven, I'm Gonna Git You Sucka, Blind Faith, Showtime, White Men Can't Jump, and B.C. Butcher. He appears in the 2013 PlayStation 3 video game Beyond: Two Souls as Cole Freeman, a doctor at the United States Department of Paranormal Activity. He appears as Edward "Big Eddy" Wallace on Season 3 of Euphoria.

== Personal life ==
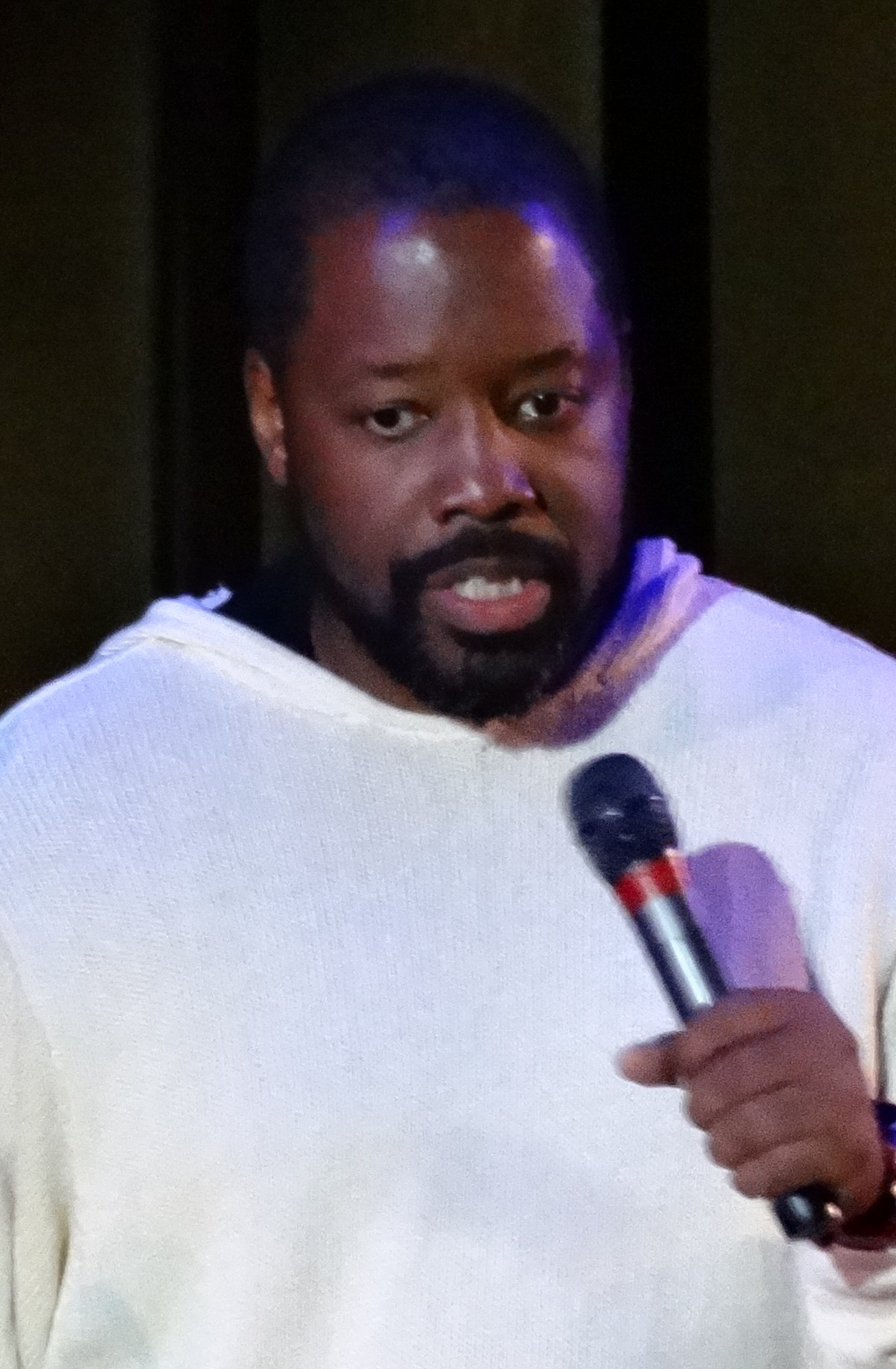
Hardison at the premiere of Beyond: Two Souls in 2013

Hardison was married to American singer Chanté Moore from 1997 until 2000; they have a daughter. Hardison remains a close friend of actor Darryl Bell, who played his best friend Ron Johnson on A Different World; he made an appearance alongside Bell on FOX's Househusbands of Hollywood.

== Filmography ==
=== Film ===
Year	Title	Role	Notes
1984	Beat Street	High School Student	
1984	Go Tell It on the Mountain	Royal	
1985	Rappin'	Moon	
1987	Enemy Territory	A-Train	
1988	School Daze	Edge	
1988	I'm Gonna Git You Sucka	Willie	
1990	Def by Temptation	K	
1992	White Men Can't Jump	Junior	
1994	Gunmen	Izzy	
1994	Renaissance Man	Pvt. Jamaal Montgomery	
1995	Panther	Judge	
1995	Vampire in Brooklyn	Julius Jones	
1997	The 6th Man	Antoine Tyler	
1997	Drive	Malik Brody	
1998	Blind Faith	Eddie Williams	
2000	Dancing in September	Winston	
2001	30 Years to Life	Bruce	
2001	Instinct to Kill	Lance Difford	
2001	Thank Heaven	Billy Ferrell	
2002	Showtime	Kyle	
2002	Who's Your Daddy?	Andy Brookes	Video
2003	Biker Boyz	T.J.	
2003	Dunsmore	Walter Taylor	
2004	Face of Terror	Jefferson	
2006	The Cassidy Kids	Dennis Peabody	
2006	Love Hollywood Style	Ice Pop	
2007	Bratz	Sasha's Dad	
2008	Made of Honour	Felix	
2008	The Sweep	Tyrone	
2010	Ashes	Matthew	
2011	Escapee	Detective Pars	
2011	The Hop Off	Charles Lee	Short
2013	The Dark Party	Jeff	
2013	Zerosome	Cyrus Wainwright	
2014	Android Cop	Sgt. Jones	
2015	Sister Switch	Gregory Cole	
2016	B.C. Butcher	Narrator	
2016	Queen of Hearts	Book	Short
2019	Paddleton	David	
2020	Playing with Beethoven	Ted	
2024	ClearMind	Tom	

=== Television ===
Year	Title	Role	Notes
1981	ABC Afterschool Specials	-	Episode: "The Colour of Friendship"
1984	The Cosby Show	Phillip Washington	Episode: "A Shirt Story"
1984	The House of Dies Drear	Mac Darrow	Television film
1985	American Playhouse	Royal	Episode: "Go Tell It on the Mountain"
1987	Spenser: For Hire	Bobby Waters	Episode: "My Enemy, My Friend"
1987–93	A Different World	Dwayne Cleofis Wayne	Main cast
1988	TV's Bloopers & Practical Jokes	Himself	Episode: "Corbin Bernsen/Kadeem Hardison/Morton Downey Jr."
1989	Dream Date	Jim Parker	Television film
1990	Saturday Morning Videos	Himself/Host	Main host
1990	The Fresh Prince of Bel-Air	Himself	Episode: "Someday Your Prince Will Be in Effect: Part 2"
1991	Sesame Street	Himself	Episode #22.42
1992	CBS Schoolbreak Special	Henry Brooks	Episode: "Words Up!"
1992	Out All Night	Dean	Episode: "Smooth Operator"
1992	Roc	Rev. Adams	Episode: "Dear Landlord"
1994	Captain Planet and the Planeteers	Goki (voice)	Episode: "Gorillas Will Be Missed"
1995	Living Single	Marcus Hughes	Episode: "Who's Scooping Who?"
1997	Touched by an Angel	Marc Hamilton	Episode: "Smokescreen"
1997–99	Between Brothers	Charles Winston	Main cast
1998	Love Boat: The Next Wave	Perry	Episode: "Smooth Sailing"
1998	Linc's	-	Episode: "Gangsta Rap"
1998	Fantasy Island	Michael Wilkinson	Episode: "Wishboned"
1998–99	The Crow: Stairway to Heaven	Skull Cowboy	Recurring cast
2000	Just Shoot Me!	Tad Gallow	Episode: "Blackjack"
2000	Happily Ever After: Fairy Tales for Every Child	Clown (voice)	Episode: "The Steadfast Tin Soldier"
2001	Intimate Portrait	Himself	Episode: "Jasmine Guy"
2001	What About Joan?	Ben	Episode: "Joan Sets Up Alice"
2001	Fire & Ice	Michael Williams	Television film
2002	Red Skies	Riley	Television film
2002–03	Livin' Large	Himself/Host	Main host
2003	Abby	Will Jefferies	Main cast
2000–04	Static Shock	Adam Evans/Rubberband Man (voice)	Recurring cast (seasons 1–2 & 4)
2005	One on One	Director	Episode: "Venice Boulevard of Broken Dreams"
2006	Just for Kicks	Charles Atwood	Recurring cast
2006	My Name is Earl	Owner	Episode: "Born a Gamblin Man"
2006	Life Is Not a Fairytale: The Fantasia Barrino Story	Joseph Barrino	Television film
2006–07	House	Lawyer Howard Gemeiner	Recurring cast (season 3)
2007	Girlfriends	Eldon Parks	Recurring cast (season 7)
2007–09	Everybody Hates Chris	Judge Harry Watkins	Guest cast (season 3–4)
2008	Under One Roof	Jamal	Episode: "Cell Out"
2009	Greek	Brian Howard	Episode: "Our Fathers"
2009	Cold Case	Andrew 'Huxtable' Garrett '09	Episode: "Read Between the Lines"
2010	Ghost Whisperer	Dean Olson	Episode: "Dead Air"
2010	The Boondocks	Himself/Bald Actor (voice)	Episode: "Pause"
2011	Ricochet	Bob Worley	Television film
2012	Parenthood	Richard Gilchrist	Episode: "Remember Me, I'm the One Who Loves You"
2012	Family Guy	NBA Player (voice)	Episode: "Ratings Guy"
2013	Cult	Paz	Recurring cast
2014	Rescuing Madison	Steven	Television film
2015	Unsung Hollywood	Himself	Episode: "A Different World"
2015–18	K.C. Undercover	Craig Cooper	Main cast
2016	Unsung Hollywood	Himself	Episode: "Jasmine Guy"
2016	Supernatural	Russell Lemmons	Episode: "Rock Never Dies"
2017	9JKL	Terrance	Episode: "The Key to Life"
2017	K.9. Undercover	Craig Cooper (voice)	Episode: "Infinite Loop"
2018	Love Is	Norman	Recurring cast
2018	The Christmas Pact	Sadie's Dad	Television film
2019	Black Monday	Spencer	Recurring cast (season 1)
2020	Teenage Bounty Hunters	Bowser Jenkins	Main cast
2020	Psych 2: Lassie Come Home	Wilkerson	Television film
2021	Reunion Road Trip	Himself	Episode: "It's a Different World"
2022	The Lincoln Lawyer	Detective Kinder	Recurring cast (season 1)
2022	Moonhaven	Arlo	Main cast
2022–24	Grown-ish	Carnegie P. Miller	Guest (seasons 4–5), recurring cast (season 6)
2023–25	The Chi	Professor Gardner	Recurring cast (season 6–7)
2024	That 90's Show	Marcus	Episode: "I Can See Clearly Now"
2026	Euphoria	Big Eddy	Recurring cast (season 3)
2026	A Different World	Dwayne Cleofis Wayne	Main cast
TBA	Criminal	Gnarley	Main cast

=== Music videos ===
Year	Song	Artist
1991	"Monster in the Mirror"	Sesame Street
1995	"Just tah Let U Know"	Eazy-E
2001	"Careful (Click, Click)"	Wu-Tang Clan

=== Video games ===
Year	Title	Role	Notes
2013	Beyond: Two Souls	Cole Freeman	Voice acting and motion capture

== Cultural influence ==
- Linda Rosenkrantz and Pamela Redmond Satran credit Hardison for making the name "Kadeem" familiar.
- Hardison is the model for the title character Michael "The Cool" Young History in the inserts of the album The Cool by Lupe Fiasco.
- Hardison was the subject of then-wife Chanté Moore's 1999 single "Chanté's Got a Man".
- In a press conference following Game 4 of the 2012 NBA Finals, Dwyane Wade wore flip-up sunglasses and said he was, "paying a little homage to Dwayne Wayne tonight", referencing Hardison's popular character from A Different World.
- In Season 2, Episode 7 of Psych ("If You're So Smart, Then Why Are You Dead"), Gus references utilizing the "Kadeem Hardison method" to kiss a girl.
- Hardison appears as the narrator on Add-2's 2019 album, Jim Crow: The Musical.
