= Kevin Wilson Jr. =

American filmmaker

- Education: Tisch School of the Arts (MFA); North Carolina A&T State University (BS)
- Occupations: Director, producer and writer
- Years active: 2010–present
- Website: www.directedbykevin.com

Kevin Wilson Jr. is an American filmmaker, best known for his film, My Nephew Emmett for which he received critical acclaim and was winner at Student Academy Award, and received an Academy Award nomination for Academy Award for Best Live Action Short Film.

== Filmography ==
Wilson directed, produced and wrote following films:

- 2024: Chef's Table: Vol. 7 Ep. 2
- 2022: Untold: The Rise & Fall of And1
- 2018: Little Red Riding Hood (Short) (completed)
- 2017: My Nephew Emmett (Short)
- 2017: The Dreamer (Short) (assistant director)
- 2012: The Unattainable Piece (Short)

== Awards and nominations ==
For My Nephew Emmett, Wilson received following accolades:

- Nominated: Academy Award for Best Live Action Short Film
- Winner: (Gold Plaque) Student Academy Award for Best Domestic Film School - Narrative
- Winner: Woodstock Film Festival - Best Student Short
- Winner: HollyShorts Film Festival - Best Director
