= Abby (TV series) =

American sitcom

- Genre: Sitcom
- Created by: Mitchel Katlin; Nat Bernstein
- Starring: Sydney Tamiia Poitier; Kadeem Hardison; Randy J. Goodwin; Tangie Ambrose; Sean O'Bryan
- Composer: Rick Marotta
- Country of origin: United States
- Original language: English
- No. of seasons: 1
- No. of episodes: 10 (1 unaired)

Production
- Executive producers: Nat Bernstein; Mitchel Katlin; Jacque Edmonds
- Production locations: Los Angeles, California
- Camera setup: Multi-camera
- Running time: 30 minutes
- Production companies: Katlin/Bernstein Productions; CBS Productions

Original release
- Network: UPN
- Release: January 6 – March 4, 2003

Abby is an American sitcom created by Nat Bernstein and Mitchel Katlin that aired for one season on UPN from January 6 to March 4, 2003. The show revolves around television producer Abigail "Abby" Walker (Sydney Tamiia Poitier) and her relationship with her ex-boyfriend Will Jeffries (Kadeem Hardison). After they break up in the pilot episode, they agree to live together as friends in their rent-controlled San Francisco apartment.

Bernstein and Katlin had intended to feature Abby and Will as an interracial couple and had cast Sean O'Bryan, a white actor, as Will. After a negative response from test audiences, they gave the role to Hardison and recast O'Bryan as a supporting character, along with Randy J. Goodwin and Tangie Ambrose.

Critics classified Abby as a sex comedy and romantic comedy. Despite UPN's heavy promotion, it attracted a weekly average of 1.7 million viewers, making it the lowest-performing show tracked by Nielsen Holdings. Critical responses were primarily negative; commentators praised Poitier's acting but criticized the show's reliance on sexual humor.

== Premise and characters ==
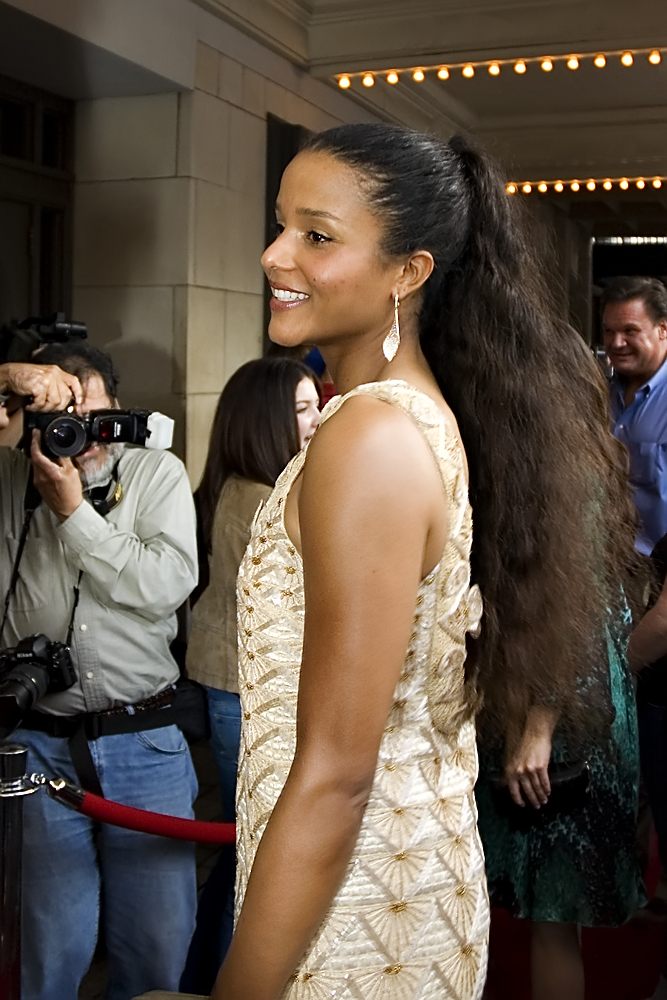
Sydney Tamiia Poitier plays the lead character of Abby.

Set in San Francisco, the series follows its titular character Abigail "Abby" Walker (Sydney Tamiia Poitier), one of the few women working for the fictional television sports program West Coast Sports Report. Although Abby becomes the producer of West Coast Sports Report, according to Bernadette Adams Davis of PopMatters, the character does not display a particular interest in any sport. Poitier characterized Abby as a woman who "doesn't design herself to fit other people's perceptions and wants". Episodes include storylines where Abby imagines being someone else, and overshares details about her love life with her best friend, Max Ellis (Randy J. Goodwin), who is also the program's anchorman.

In the pilot, Abby breaks up with her boyfriend, Will Jeffries (Kadeem Hardison), but they argue over their rent-controlled apartment and decide to share it as platonic roommates. A writer for Jet called their relationship "antagonistic and supportive". Will, a professional photographer, still harbors feelings for Abby and attempts to rekindle their romance. He is portrayed as selfish with no interest in her professional life. Incidents showing his negative behavior include his purchase of an expensive watch for himself for their second anniversary, and his marriage proposal to Abby saying "there is no more perfect gift" than himself. Abby's concept and tone received comparisons to the sitcoms Three's Company and Will & Grace. Rob Owen referred to the series as a sex comedy, though other critics felt it was a romantic comedy.

Abby's sister, Joanne "Jo" Walker (Tangie Ambrose), and Max each support Abby. Jo encourages her to move on from her relationship with Will, while Max harbors an unrequited crush on Abby over the course of the series. Abby frequently clashes with her chauvinistic boss, Roger Tomkins (Sean O'Bryan), who is also close friends with Will. Roger frequently attends the gentlemen's club "The Booty Barn" with Will, and advises him to reconcile with Abby. The Sun-Sentinel's Tom Jicha described Roger as the series' "token white" character. Abby's mother and father, played by Michelle Phillips and Charlie Robinson, appear as recurring characters.

== Production ==
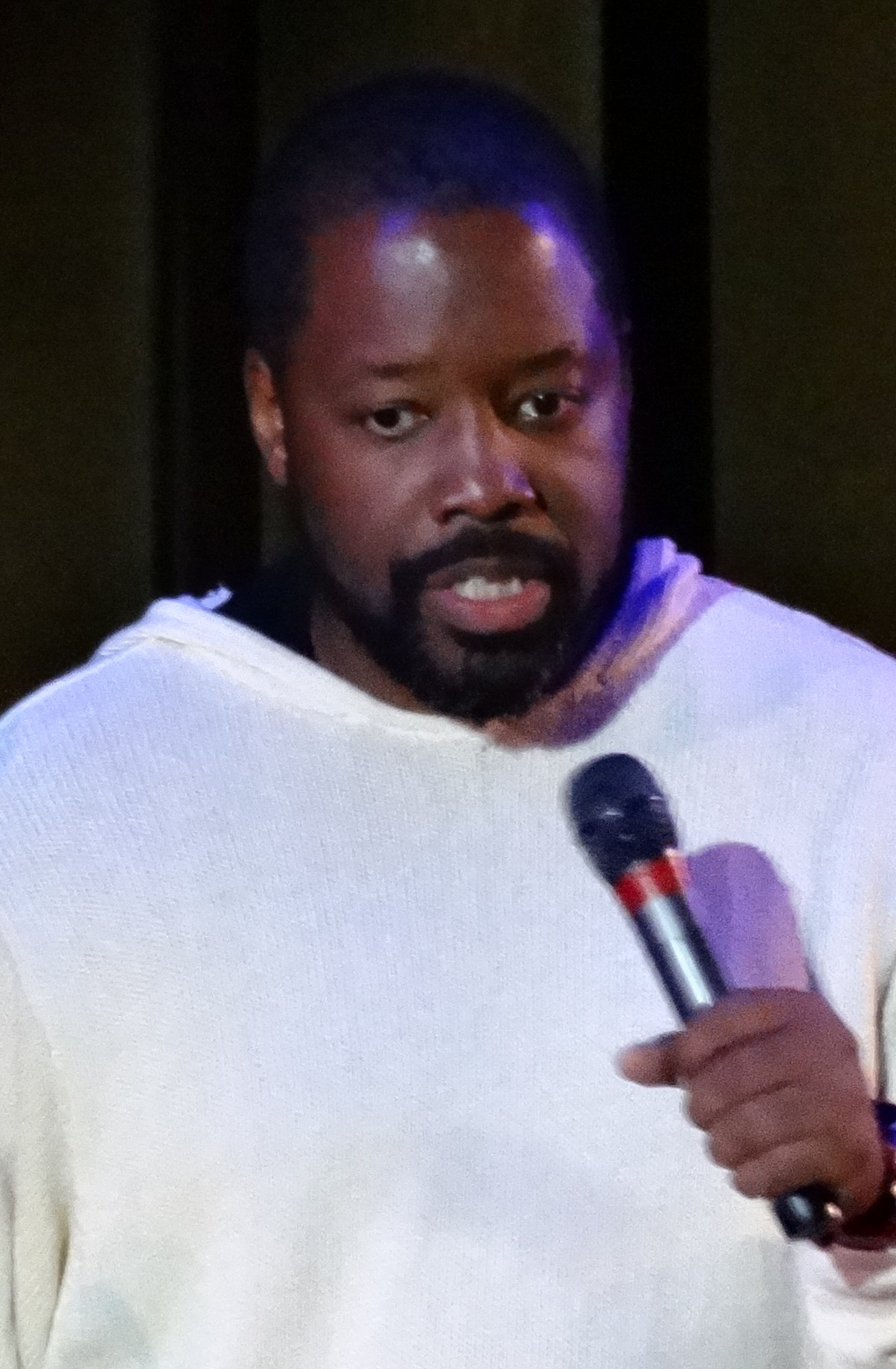
Kadeem Hardison, who replaced Sean O'Bryan as Will Jeffries following preview audiences' response to the pilot episode

Developed under the working title Abby Newton, Abby was executively produced by Nat Bernstein, Mitchel Katlin, and Jacque Edmonds. Bernstein and Katlin further contributed to the series as display artists and writers. The show was handled by CBS Productions and Katlin/Bernstein Productions. Leonard R. Garner Jr. directed the pilot, which was filmed in Los Angeles along with the rest of the series. Rick Marotta composed the soundtrack.

In 2002, United Paramount Network (UPN) announced that Poitier and O'Bryan would play the lead characters. Abby was Poitier's first starring role in a television series, and her sitcom debut. Describing the show's main concept as "fertile ground for a lot of humor", Poitier was also drawn to its multicultural casting. Producers initially imagined Will as a white character; Katlin said: "We had wanted to have an interracial relationship, but not make the show about an interracial relationship." Producers gave the role to Hardison instead of O'Bryan due to a negative response from test audiences. Criticizing the pilot episode for not explicitly addressing Will and Abby's interracial relationship, the previewers frequently asked: "Why aren't you dealing with it?"

Addressing the change in casting, Poitier clarified that the series would preserve a "spirit of multiculturalism" through Will and Abby's dating life. She referred to Abby as one of the few television shows to represent interracial couples. As part of a discussion on UPN's 2002–2003 television season, The Baltimore Sun's Greg Braxton cited Abby as an example of the network adding more white actors to its programming; Braxton pointed to the show's focus on a biracial woman and her dates with white men. CBS television executive Leslie Moonves explained that UPN wanted to attract a wider audience.

== Episodes ==
No.	Title	Directed by	Written by	Original release date	US viewers (millions)
1	"The Breakup"	Leonard R. Garner Jr.	Nat Bernstein & Mitchel Katlin	January 6, 2003	4.10
After they break up, Abby and Will decide to share their rent-controlled San Francisco apartment as neither of them wants to move out. Roger pushes for the pair to reconcile, while Jo encourages Abby to move on.
2	"Moving On"	Mary Lou Belli	Nat Bernstein & Mitchel Katlin	January 7, 2003	2.61
Roger gives Abby tickets to a Kenny Lattimore concert, but she discovers he has a hidden agenda after seeing Will at the same event.
3	"Abby's First Date"	Leonard R. Garner Jr.	Jacque Edmonds	January 14, 2003	2.12
Abby goes on an unsuccessful first date. Though she found him extremely boring, she obsesses over why he does not contact her for a second date.
4	"Ted & Carol & Will & Abby"	Mark Cendrowski	Eric Abrams & Matthew Berry	January 21, 2003	1.02
Abby fears that her close friends Ted and Carol may choose to remain close with Will instead of her.
5	"Abby Gets Her Groove Back"	Henry Chan	Jacque Edmonds	February 4, 2003	2.19
Abby becomes attracted to a man she meets at the gym.
6	"The Mama and the Papa"	Leslie Kolins-Samll	Nat Bernstein & Mitchel Katlin	February 11, 2003	2.01
Abby invites Will to her parents' 30th anniversary party, even though her mother had disliked him in the past.
7	"Leggo My Ego"	Andrew Tsao	Bob Myer	February 18, 2003	1.54
Abby has trouble firing a former sports star Roger had assigned to the evening sports report. Will's friends hold a bachelor party for him as they believe the couple are engaged.
8	"Bare Naked Lady"	Andrew Tsao	Lori Lakin	February 25, 2003	1.78
Will holds an exhibition at an art gallery that includes nude images of Abby.
9	"Kiss My Ex"	Andrew Tsao	Lori Lakin	March 4, 2003	1.67
Will turns to Abby for advice on how to best handle his love interest, Cassandra.
10	"Abby Wallows, Max Follows"	N/A	N/A	Unaired	N/A

== Broadcast history ==
Following a Monday night preview, Abby was a mid-season replacement after the paranormal drama Haunted was canceled. UPN aired the series to Tuesday nights at 9:00 pm EST, after the supernatural drama Buffy the Vampire Slayer The first non-genre show placed in the time slot in two years, Abby aired against established programs Frasier, 24, The Guardian, and Smallville during a "competitive" time.

UPN promoted the series as part of "an aggressive rollout strategy", targeting a primarily African-American audience. The Deseret News' Scott D. Pierce wrote that the network was "pinning its hopes on the new sitcom" along with the drama Platinum. UPN branded its Tuesday programming as a "comedy night" and "Girls Night", though Poitier was uncertain of the audience's possible response to the mixture of sitcoms and dramas. She explained that the network wanted Abby to attract the same audience as its Monday comedies.

Commercially unsuccessful, Abby ranked last on the list of 146 shows tracked by the Nielsen Holdings; it attracted an average of 1.7 million viewers per week. Canceled after a nine-episode season, the series had its final episode air on March 4, 2003. From July 2003 to August 2003, reruns aired on Tuesday nights at 8:30 pm EST. Overall, Abby was broadcast for a total of 270 minutes.

== Critical reception ==
Abby received negative critical feedback, primarily for its sexual humor. Calling the series "pleasant but not funny", USA Today's Robert Bianco criticized its humor as an example of UPN's reliance on sexual comedy. Michael Speier of Variety panned the show for its "booty humor" and frequent scenes "about hot sex, about messy sex and about dirty sex". Deriding the premise for its "strained humor", Bernadette Adams Davis questioned the effectiveness of the focus on Abby's on-again, off-again relationship with Will. A contributor for People summed up Abby as "plain dumb".

While the Chicago Tribune's Allan Johnson criticized Poitier's performance, writing that she was "not appealing enough to lift what becomes a very uncomfortable premise", some commentators praised her acting. Highlighting Poitier's use of physical comedy, Speier wrote that Poitier responded to the male characters with "proper nuance and appropriate tones". Davis praised the use of Abby's professional life for episodes, writing that ensemble shows (Girlfriends, The Parkers, and Living Single) frequently relegate a woman's career to the background. Davis hoped that the sitcom would focus more on Abby, particularly a "single, career-minded" version of the character. Despite being critical of the series' premise, Diane Werts of Newsday felt "the execution makes it fly".
