= Jordan Aaron Hall =

American actor (born 2002)

- Born: December 2, 2002 (age 23); Harlem, New York City, U.S
- Occupations: Actor; director
- Years active: 2020–present

Jordan Aaron Hall (born December 2, 2002) is an American actor and director. He is known for What We Found (2020) as Marcus Jackson, The Idea of You (2024) as Zeke Randall and A Different World (2026) as Amir Rodale.

== Career ==
Jordan Aaron Hall began his performing career as a child actor, appearing in stage productions and touring productions. His early theatre credits included playing Young Simba in The Lion King, Young Michael Jackson in Motown: The Musical, and Tommy in Matilda the Musical.

Hall made his screen debut in the 2020 independent film What We Found, in which he played Marcus Jackson. He subsequently appeared as Young Pray in the television series Pose in 2021 and as Nasir in an episode of The Equalizer in 2022. In 2023, he appeared in the biographical film Rustin as a Teen Boy Singing. The following year, he played Zeke in the romantic comedy-drama film The Idea of You.

In 2025, Hall wrote, directed and starred in the short film Graduation Day, playing Cheech. The film marked his work as a filmmaker in addition to his acting career. In 2026, he joined the cast of the television series A Different World, a sequel series to the original sitcom, playing Amir Rodale. The series marks Hall’s first leading television role.

== Filmography ==
=== Film ===
List of Jordan Aaron Hall film credits
| Year | Title | Role | Notes |
|---|---|---|---|
| 2020 | What We Found | Marcus Jackson | Credited as Jordan Hall |
| 2023 | Rustin | Teen Boy Singing | |
| 2024 | The Idea of You | Zeke Randall | |
| 2025 | Graduation Day | Cheech | Also writer and director; short film |

=== Television ===
List of Cornell Young IV film credits
| Year | Title | Role | Notes |
|---|---|---|---|
| 2021 | Pose | Young Pray Tell | 1 episode |
| 2022 | The Equalizer | Nasir | 1 episode |
| 2026 | A Different World | Amir Rodale | 10 episodes |
