= Yetide Badaki =

Nigerian actress (born 1981)

Yetide
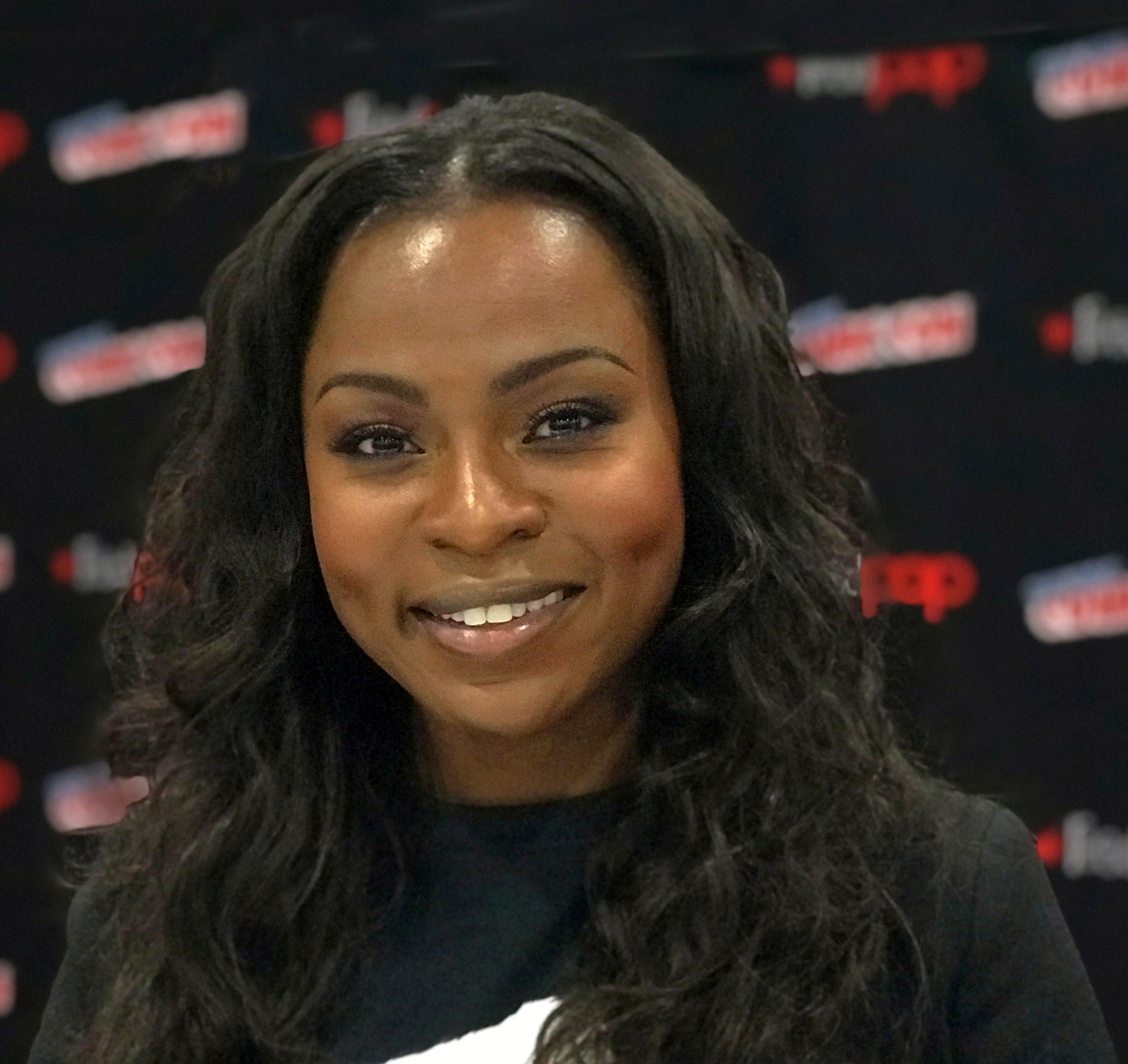
- Yetide at the 2017 New York Comic Con
- Born: 24 September 1981 (age 45); Ibadan, Nigeria
- Education: McGill University (BA); Illinois State University (MFA)
- Occupation: Actress
- Years active: 2003–present

Yetide Badaki (born 24 September) is a Nigerian actress. She is best known for playing Bilquis on the Starz series American Gods.

== Early life ==
Yetide was born in Ibadan, Nigeria. Before moving to England, Yetide lived in Nigeria for three years. At the age of 6, she returned to Nigeria. Finally, she settled in America at age twelve. She is a graduate of McGill University with a major in English Literature (Theater) and a minor in Environmental Science. Yetide also has a Master of Fine Arts in Theatre from Illinois State University.

== Career ==
Yetide received a 2006 Jeff Award nomination for Best Actress in a Principal Role (Play) for I Have Before Me a Remarkable Document Given to Me by a Young Lady from Rwanda. She has received positive reviews for her portrayal of Bilquis on American Gods. For the television series, the character of Bilquis was expanded from the novel. In 2018, Yetide played the recurring character Chi Chi on This Is Us.

Yetide has written a short film called In Hollywoodland, which she funded with IndieGoGo. Yetide and Karen David produced and starred in the short film while Jessica Sherif directed it. In Hollywoodland is a re-imagining of Alice in Wonderland set in present-day Los Angeles. In Hollywoodland premiered in August 2020 at the Bentonville Film Festival.

Yetide played the mother of Giannis Antetokounmpo in the 2022 biographical movie Rise for Disney Plus.

In 2023, Deadline announced that Yetide was developing a Nigerian vampire series titled Naija Vamp with Prentice Penny and Sebastian A. Jones, as both a comics series and a TV series.

Yetide has also played the notable role of an Illyrian attorney, Neera Ketoul in 2023 in Star Trek: Strange New Worlds wherein she saved fellow Illyrian, Una Chin-Riley from dishonorable discharge and 20 years in a Federation penal colony for lying about the genetic engineering that she received, going against the Federation’s codes.

== Personal life ==
She became a United States citizen in 2014. In 2021, Yetide revealed that she is bisexual.

== Filmography ==
=== Film ===
Year	Title	Role	Notes
2003	Expiration	Naomi	
2017	Cardinal X	Anita	
2019	The Buried Girl	Alex	
2019	Precipice	Morena	Short
2019	The Long Shadow	Sissy Leblanc	
2020	What We Found	Alex	
2020	Chasing the Rain	The Woman	
2022	Rise	Veronica Antetokounmpo	

=== Television ===
Year	Title	Role	Notes
2008	Lost	Narjiss	Episode: "The Shape of Things to Come"
2012	Touch	Grace	Episode: "Safety in Numbers"
2012	The Failing Man	Sanjana	4 episodes
2013	Criminal Minds	Maya Carcani	Episode: "Final Shot"
2014	Sequestered	Keira	7 episodes
2014	Masters of Sex	Nurse Williams	Episode: "Blackbird"
2015	NCIS: New Orleans	Felicia Patrice	Episode: "Le Carnaval de la Mort"
2015	Aquarius	Rita Carter	Episode: "Your Mother Should Know"
2016	K.C. Undercover	Penelope	Episode: "Coopers Reactivated!"
2017–2021	American Gods	Bilquis	26 episodes
2018–2019	This Is Us	Chi Chi	4 episodes
2020	The Magicians	Zoe Marcus	Episode: "The Mountain of Ghosts"
2023	Star Trek: Strange New Worlds	Neera Ketoul	Episode: "Ad Astra Per Aspera"
2024	Twilight of the Gods	Dahl	3 episodes
2025	Tomb Raider: The Legend of Lara Croft	Yemọja (voice)	
TBA	Army of the Dead: Lost Vegas	Queen Meeru (voice)	
TBA	Queen Nzinga	Nzinga of Ndongo and Matamba	Main cast
TBA	Naija Vamp	Bisi	

=== Video games ===
Year	Title	Role	Notes
2016	Call of Duty: Infinite Warfare	Ebele Yetide	Voice

== See also ==
- List of Yoruba people
- List of Nigerian actresses
