= My Nephew Emmett =

- Poster
- Directed by: Kevin Wilson Jr.
- Written by: Kevin Wilson Jr.
- Produced by: Lauren L. Owen; Kevin Wilson Jr.
- Starring: Jasmine Guy; Dane Rhodes; L.B. Williams
- Cinematography: Laura Valladao
- Edited by: Alex DeMille
- Music by: Gavin Brivik
- Release date: May 7, 2017 (NYU Tisch)
- Running time: 20 minutes
- Country: United States
- Language: English

My Nephew Emmett is an American live-action short film directed by Kevin Wilson Jr. It was nominated for an Academy Award for Best Live Action Short Film at the 90th Academy Awards in 2018. Wilson won the Student Academy Award for Best Narrative, producing it while a graduate student at New York University.

== Plot ==
The murder of 14-year-old Emmett Till in 1955 Mississippi is experienced from his uncle's perspective.

== Cast ==
- Jasmine Guy as Elizabeth Wright
- Dane Rhodes as J.W. Milam
- L.B. Williams as Mose Wright
- Joshua Wright as Emmett Till

== Reception ==
=== Critical response ===
My Nephew Emmett has an approval rating of 91% on review aggregator website Rotten Tomatoes, based on 11 reviews, and an average rating of 8.83/10.

=== Awards and nominations ===
At the 90th Annual Academy Awards ceremony in 2018, the film was nominated for the Academy Award for Best Live Action Short Film.

== See also ==
- Civil rights movement in popular culture
