= Rise (2022 American film) =

- Release poster
- Directed by: Akin Omotoso
- Written by: Arash Amel
- Produced by: Bernie Goldmann
- Starring: Uche Agada; Ral Agada; Jaden Osimuwa; Elijah Shomanke; Yetide Badaki; Dayo Okeniyi
- Cinematography: Kabelo Thathe
- Edited by: Vuyani Sondlo
- Music by: Ré Olunuga
- Production companies: Walt Disney Pictures; Faliro House Productions
- Distributed by: Disney+
- Release date: June 24, 2022
- Running time: 111 minutes
- Countries: United States; Greece
- Languages: English; Greek

Rise is a 2022 biographical sports drama film directed by Akin Omotoso, from a script written by Arash Amel. Based on the true story of three young Nigerian-Greek brothers, Giannis, Thanasis and Kostas Antetokounmpo, who emigrate to the United States and rise to fame and success within the National Basketball Association. The film stars newcomers Uche Agada, Ral Agada, and Jaden Osimuwa in the three primary roles; with Elijah Shomanke, Yetide Badaki, and Dayo Okeniyi in supporting family roles.

Rise was produced by Walt Disney Pictures and released as a Disney+ original film on June 24, 2022. It received generally positive reviews from critics.

== Plot ==
In 1990, Charles and Veronica "Vera" Antetokounmpo are forced to leave their eldest son Francis in Nigeria while they travel to Greece for a better life. They are unable to get visas due to the political climate and thus have no identification and must remain in hiding. By 2004, they are settled and have four more sons, Thanasis, Giannis, Kostas and Alexandros. Despite being born in Greece, they are not granted legal citizenship due to jus sanguinis nationality laws; putting their family at risk of deportation and separation. Their Yoruba surname is hellenized to Antetokounmpo amidst immigration processing after the family escapes refugee round-ups in Turkey. Charles tries to get documentation, but the double standard, in that he needs a visa for work, but he cannot get a job necessary to get a visa, frustrates the whole family.

Thanasis and Giannis begin playing basketball in the park. While Thanasis shows natural skill, Giannis has difficulty learning the game, but displays potential. They are invited to go to Filathlitikos to use the gym for free where they meet the coach Takis Zivas who sees promise in the two. By 2007, Thanasis is a star player and Giannis has improved significantly. The Antetokounmpos continue to face adversity when Thanasis is offered a check by a promising college team, only for it to get denied when his family history is looked into. Charles buys a car for the family, but are nearly kicked out of their apartment despite having the money for the next two weeks.

While playing a match, Giannis and Thanasis are scouted by drafters, particularly a young one named Haris Eleftheriou who is trying to convince the scout manager Paco to recruit the brothers. During the game Thanasis injures his leg; leaving Giannis to finish the game. Paco is unwilling to commit to them due to their status and Haris convinces Giannis to sign with him. True to their fears, none of the major teams are willing to sign Giannis; forcing him to have to play for recruitment. A Spanish league is willing to sign to him and will even grant Giannis citizenship, but he asks that his family also get recognized as well. Paco attempts to usurp Haris by offering them money, citizenship and immediate acceptance, but Haris will be dropped. Not willing to let go the person who fought for them, the Antetokounmpos turn down his offer.

Haris reveals that the Spanish team will not sign him to them, but they will grant him eligibility to try out for the 2013 NBA draft. If he succeeds his whole family will be relocated to America. Giannis asks that Thanasis come with him as they and Haris arrive in New York City to meet with American agent Kevin Stefanides. Haris and Kevin continue to try and pitch Giannis to various recruiters and manage to speak with John Hammond who appears apprehensive, though they do manage to intrigue a representative from Nike. Giannis is nervous after hearing that he might not be good enough, but Thanasis supports him. At the draft, Giannis is thrilled to hear that the Milwaukee Bucks chose him as their fifteenth pick; securing his family's future.

== Cast ==
- Dayo Okeniyi as Charles Antetokounmpo
- Yetide Badaki as Veronica "Vera" Antetokounmpo
- Uche Agada as Giannis Antetokounmpo
  - McColm Cephas Jr. as Young Giannis
- Ral Agada as Athanasios "Thanasis" Antetokounmpo
  - Chinua Baraka Payne as Young Thanasis
  - Daniel Agammegwa as Toddler Thanasis
- Elijah Shomanke as Alexandros "Alex" Antetokounmpo
  - Jahleel Kamara as Young Alexandros
- Jaden Osimuwa as Konstantinos "Kostas" Antetokounmpo
  - Aaron Kingsley Adetola as Young Kostas
- Efthimis Chalkidis as Haris Eleftheriou
- Panos Koronis as Takis Zivas
- Manish Dayal as Kevin Stefanides: the talent agent of Giannis Antetokounmpo
- Christos Loulis as Paco
- Akin Omotoso as Bamidele
- Anthony Abiola as Francis Antetokounmpo
- Taylor Nichols as John Hammond: the General Manager of Milwaukee Bucks
- Joke Silva as Cecelia
- Kemi Lala Akindoju as Joy
- Stamatina Gaj as Ms. Pandazis
- Maximiliano Hernández as Oklahoma City Thunder Rep

== Production ==
=== Development ===
In October 2020, a biographical film centered around Giannis Antetokounmpo and his family was announced to be in development from The Walt Disney Studios. Developed under the working title of "Greek Freak" (a basketball nickname for Giannis), with Akin Omotoso serving as director from a script written by Arash Amel, the project was stated to show "through faith, determination, and their unbreakable bond, [the Antetokounmpo family] unite[s] to lift themselves out of a life of poverty as undocumented immigrants living in Greece." Bernie Goldmann was announced to serve as producer, while Giannis serves as executive producer. Production was tentatively scheduled to commence some time in 2021, in Greece and the United States.

=== Casting ===
In March 2021, newcomer Uche Agada was cast to play Giannis Antetokounmpo after seeing a social media post from the NBA star regarding an open casting call for the role. Yetide Badaki and Dayo Okeniyi were cast in supporting roles as the parents of Giannis, Veronica and Charles Antetokounmpo. In October of the same year, the official title of the film was revealed to be Rise. The rest of the cast was announced with Ral Agada as Thanasis Antetokounmpo, Jaden Osimuwa as Kostas Antetokounmpo, and Elijah Shomanke as Alex Antetokounmpo. Manish Dayal and Taylor Nichols were revealed in supporting roles as Giannis's talent agent Alex Saratsis named Kevin, and the General Manager of the Milwaukee Bucks named John Hammond. Maximiliano Hernández, Pilar Holland, and McColm Kona Cephas Jr. also joined the cast.

Giannis Antetokounmpo made the official statement in his role as executive producer: "I am thrilled and honored that Disney+ is bringing my family's story to people all over the world. My hope is that it will inspire those in similar circumstances to keep the faith, stay true to their goals and not to give up on striving for a better life."

=== Filming ===
Principal photography was revealed to have already commenced in October 2021, with official production photos released by Disney. Rise was filmed in Athens, Greece making it the first Disney production filmed entirely in Europe.

== Release ==
Rise was released exclusively through streaming on Disney+, on June 24, 2022.

== Reception ==
=== Critical response ===
On the review aggregator website Rotten Tomatoes, 95% of 21 critics' reviews are positive, with an average rating of 7.10/10. On Metacritic, the film has a weighted average score of 74 out of 100 based on reviews from 5 critics, indicating "generally favorable reviews".

Calum Marsh of The New York Times found Akin Omotoso's direction to be sincere and convincing, praised the performances of the cast members, and stated the film succeeds to narrate the life of the Antetokounmpo family across the obstacles they encountered. Gary Goldstein of Los Angeles Times found Rise to be an inspirational and emotional sport movie, praised Omotoso's direction and Arash Amel's script, and applauded the performances of the cast. Pete Hammond of Deadline Hollywood called the performances of the actors excellent, stating Okeniyi and Badaki could not manage to be better across the film, found Omotoso to be skillful across his direction, and stated Amel provides an outstanding true-life story. Sourav Chakraborty of Sportskeeda found Rise to be an inspiring sports movie, stated Omotoso provides an atmosphere of tension across his direction, and praised the performances of the cast members.

Aramide Tinubu of RogerEbert.com gave Rise 3.5 out of 4 stars, praised the performances of the actors, called the dialogue of the film moving, and claimed Omotoso manages to capture the tension felt by the Antetokounmpo family across the barriers they faced. Jennifer Green of Common Sense Media rated the film 3 out of 5 stars, praised the depiction of positive messages and the presence of role models, citing hard work and perseverance, and complimented the diverse representations across the characters and their origins.

=== Accolades ===
Ré Olunuga was nominated for Best Original Score - Streamed Live Action Film (No Theatrical Release) at the 2022 Hollywood Music in Media Awards.

== See also ==
- List of basketball films
