= Dwayne Cleofis Wayne =

Fictional character

Dwayne Wayne
- A Different World character
- First appearance: Reconcilable Differences
- Last appearance: When One Door Closes...: Part 2
- Created by: Bill Cosby
- Portrayed by: Kadeem Hardison

In-universe information
- Full name: Dwayne Cleophus Wayne
- Gender: Male
- Occupation: Student
- Family: Adele Wayne (mother); Woodson Wayne (father); Deborah Wayne (daughter)
- Spouse: Whitley Marion Gilbert-Wayne
- Nationality: American

Dwayne Wayne is a fictional character who appears in the American sitcom A Different World, portrayed by actor Kadeem Hardison.

He is known for his trademark flip up eyeglasses/shades and making unsuccessful advances on numerous women throughout his freshman year.

Maggie Lauten, portrayed by actress Marisa Tomei who left the show after one season, was to have an interracial relationship with Dwayne.

Dwayne Wayne has an on again off again relationship with Whitley Gilbert-Wayne. They eventually get married and visit Los Angeles, which coincided with the 1992 riots following the verdict in the Rodney King trial.

== Character history ==
A native of Brooklyn, New York, Dwayne was known for his characteristic flip-up glasses and for his habit of flirting with girls on the college campus. He was a student, tutor, and teacher all through the series of A Different World. He majored in mathematics and engineering. In the first season, he was in love with sophomore Denise Huxtable, who was portrayed by Lisa Bonet. By the second season, he wanted to enter a serious relationship with Suzanne, the daughter of Col. Taylor (Glynn Turman). Suzanne ended the relationship because she was not ready for a serious commitment. Then Dwayne started to fall for Whitley, but stopped pursuing her after the third season when she seemed uninterested. By the fourth season, Dwayne had found an interest in Kinu Owens, portrayed by Alisa Gyse Dickens. The relationship ended when Kinu realized that Dwayne was still in love with Whitley Gilbert. He eventually proposed to Whitley. In the beginning of the fifth season, Dwayne became a calculus teacher, but the students put a mutiny out on him because of his strict rules. Whitley was beginning to put too much pressure on Dwayne. Dwayne decided to have a coffee date with Lisa Westin (Debbi Morgan). His honesty made him confess the truth to Whitley. Whitley was heartbroken and broke off the engagement. By the end of this season, Whitley had fallen in love with Byron Douglass, portrayed by Joe Morton. Dwayne became jealous of their whirlwind romance, and spent the night with Whitley. When Byron proposed to Whitley, who still was in love with Dwayne secretly; Dwayne was heartbroken. At the wedding, Dwayne and Whitley could not hold the pressure anymore and pushed Byron out of the picture and got married. In the sixth season, Dwayne and Whitley told of their horrifying honeymoon, experiencing the 1992 Los Angeles riots in Los Angeles. At the end of the series, Dwayne got a new job in Tokyo, and decided to move with a now-pregnant Whitley.

== Reception ==
The character was praised as a positive portrayal of an African-American male college student and as an engineer and mathematician.
