= Whitley Gilbert-Wayne =

- A Different World character
- First appearance: Reconcilable Differences
- Last appearance: When One Door Closes...: Part 2
- Created by: Bill Cosby
- Portrayed by: Jasmine Guy

In-universe information
- Full name: Whitley Marion Gilbert (later Whitley Marion Gilbert-Wayne)
- Gender: Female
- Occupation: Assistant Art Buyer; Teacher
- Family: Mercer Gilbert (father); Marion Height Gilbert (mother); Deborah Wayne (youngest daughter)
- Spouse: Dwayne Cleofis Wayne
- Nationality: American

Whitley Marion Gilbert-Wayne is a fictional character who appears in the American sitcom A Different World, portrayed by actress Jasmine Guy. Warming up to whiz student Dwayne Wayne, the two have an on/off flirtation with each other until their eventual marriage near the end of the series.

== Conception ==
Whitley Gilbert was based on head writer Susan Fales-Hill. When Jasmine Guy auditioned for the role of Whitley Gilbert, she originally considered using her own Northern accent, but instead used an exaggerated Southern accent, believing it would be more comedic. The inspiration for Whitley's accent was Miss Pinkard, Guy's third-grade teacher and her first teacher in the Atlanta Public Schools system after her family moved to Atlanta from Boston.

== Character history ==
In the beginning of the series, Whitley Gilbert was the spoiled Southern belle of Gilbert Hall (which was named after her family), but viewers watched Whitley evolve over the seasons. Denise Huxtable and Whitley shared a room briefly before Denise went back to Jaleesa. Later in the 1st season, Whitley befriended Millie. At the end of the season, Whitley loaned Dwayne Wayne money so that he could go on his date with Denise.

When Denise left the show, Whitley and Dwayne became friends and ultimately each other's love interest; their attraction developed through the next 2 seasons of the show. Despite this, Whitley dated Julian Day during Season 3. The relationship ended when Julian took Whitley out to a fancy dinner to ask Whitley to move in with him instead of proposing as she'd expected. At the end of the third season, Whitley decided to stay in school for another year to get the degree she really wanted.

At the start of the fourth season, Whitley became interested in Dwayne to such a degree that she schemed how Kinu, Dwayne's girlfriend at the time, might break up with him. She even went on a date with his best friend, Ron.

During her continued studies, Whitley became the dorm director of Height Hall.

Dwayne ultimately realized his true feelings for Whitley and eventually proposed (she accepted). Whitley began to put a lot of pressure on Dwayne which led to him going out with another woman for coffee. When he told her, Whitley broke off the engagement. Dwayne and Whitley became mean to each other.

Whitley got her dream job buying corporate art. She was very good at it, but after she was sexually harassed by her boss, she decided to file a complaint against him, but was unable to prove it. Later, Whitley started going out with Byron Douglas, who was running for senator. Dwayne became very jealous. Whitley decided to clear the air with Dwayne and finally put their relationship in the past. The conversation turned into a fight, and they ended up sleeping together. Whitley confessed what happened with Dwayne to Byron, and she and Byron decided it was time to become an official couple. After winning the election, Byron proposed to Whitley. At the wedding, Dwayne showed Whitley he still loved her and asked her to marry him with the now famous plea “Baby, please, please!” Whitley agreed and they got married right away. During their honeymoon, they were in Los Angeles and were caught in the middle of the riots.

During the final season of the show, they found a nice house to live in, which they rented from a French professor at Hillman. Whitley was laid off from her job as an art buyer, which led to a series of episodes forcing her to deal with the ups and downs of real life (unemployment and job searches). She eventually took a job as a teacher in the inner city. This led to her developing a relationship tutoring one of her young students struggling with learning through the use of conventional methods. The student, a female, shows an interest in sports which inspires Dwayne (with the original idea for the game coming from his best friend Ron Johnson) to develop an educational video game (Grammar Boy). He decides to pitch the game to Kinishewa which landed him a job paying $80,000 a year (in Japan). The final episode follows Whitley and Dwayne as they announce the news that they are expecting their first child and moving to Japan.

== Reception ==
The character gained a mostly positive reception from critics.
