= MDMA (film) =

2017 American crime drama film

- Theatrical release poster
- Directed by: Angie Wang
- Written by: Angie Wang
- Produced by: Angie Wang; Richard J. Bosner
- Starring: Annie Q.; Francesca Eastwood; Pierson Fodé; Scott Keiji Takeda; Aalyrah Caldwell; Yetide Badaki; Noah Segan; Elisa Donovan; Ron Yuan
- Cinematography: Brett Pawlak
- Edited by: Robert Schafer; Jeff Castelluccio
- Music by: Pei Pei Chung
- Production companies: Fire Horse Film Productions LLC; Blue Creek Pictures
- Distributed by: Shout! Factory
- Release dates: March 10, 2017 (CAAMFest); September 14, 2018 (United States)
- Country: United States
- Language: English

MDMA (also known as Cardinal X or Angie X) is a 2017 American crime drama film written and directed by Angie Wang, and produced by Wang and Fire Horse Film Productions LLC in association with Blue Creek Pictures. The film is about a young woman, Angie Wang (played by Annie Q.), who becomes the biggest supplier of MDMA on the West Coast of the United States in the mid-1980s. According to the film's official website, it is "inspired by true events" from Wang's own life.

The film had its world premiere at CAAMFest on March 10, 2017. It was released in the United States in select theaters and through digital and on demand services on September 14, 2018, by Shout! Factory.

== Plot ==
Angie is in college, but finding that money is hard for her family. Her father tells her to change colleges to save money, and she decides to earn some money herself. While partying with friends, she is introduced to MDMA.

She realizes that MDMA is unregulated, and so neither legal nor illegal. After researching the papers published by the developing teams, she formulates her own method and starts production. She works hard both in and after school, and parties, where she also sells her own product, all while keeping the supply anonymous.

== Cast ==
- Annie Q. as Angie
- Francesca Eastwood as Jeanine
- Pierson Fodé as Alex
- Elisa Donovan as Mary
- Ron Yuan as Michael
- Yetide Badaki as Anita
- Aalyrah Caldwell as Bree
- Scott Keiji Takeda as Tommy
- Henry Zaga as Donnie

== Production ==
The film is based on Wang's personal life and experiences as it was, according to the Blue Creek Pictures website, "inspired by true events of Wang's gritty past as one of the major players in the party-drug business."

== Reception ==
On Rotten Tomatoes, the film has an approval rating of 53% based on 17 reviews, with an average rating of 6.12/10.

Sheri Linden of the "Hollywood Reporter" wrote: "It's Wang's eye for social realities, brought to life by her cast, that gives her film its edge." Film Threat gave it a rave, Bradley Gibson stating "This is a fantastic film. Imagine any John Hughes film as a drug-fueled drama." Kimber Myers of the Los Angeles Times said that the film "falls short of feeling ecstatic", and that "Wang could have used some distance from the material." She also felt the film fell short of its potential, with Wang being too involved as "the film’s sole director, writer and subject", and that she used unnecessary sub-plot to "cast her on-screen counterpart in a better light".
