= Jasmine Guy =

American actress (born 1962)

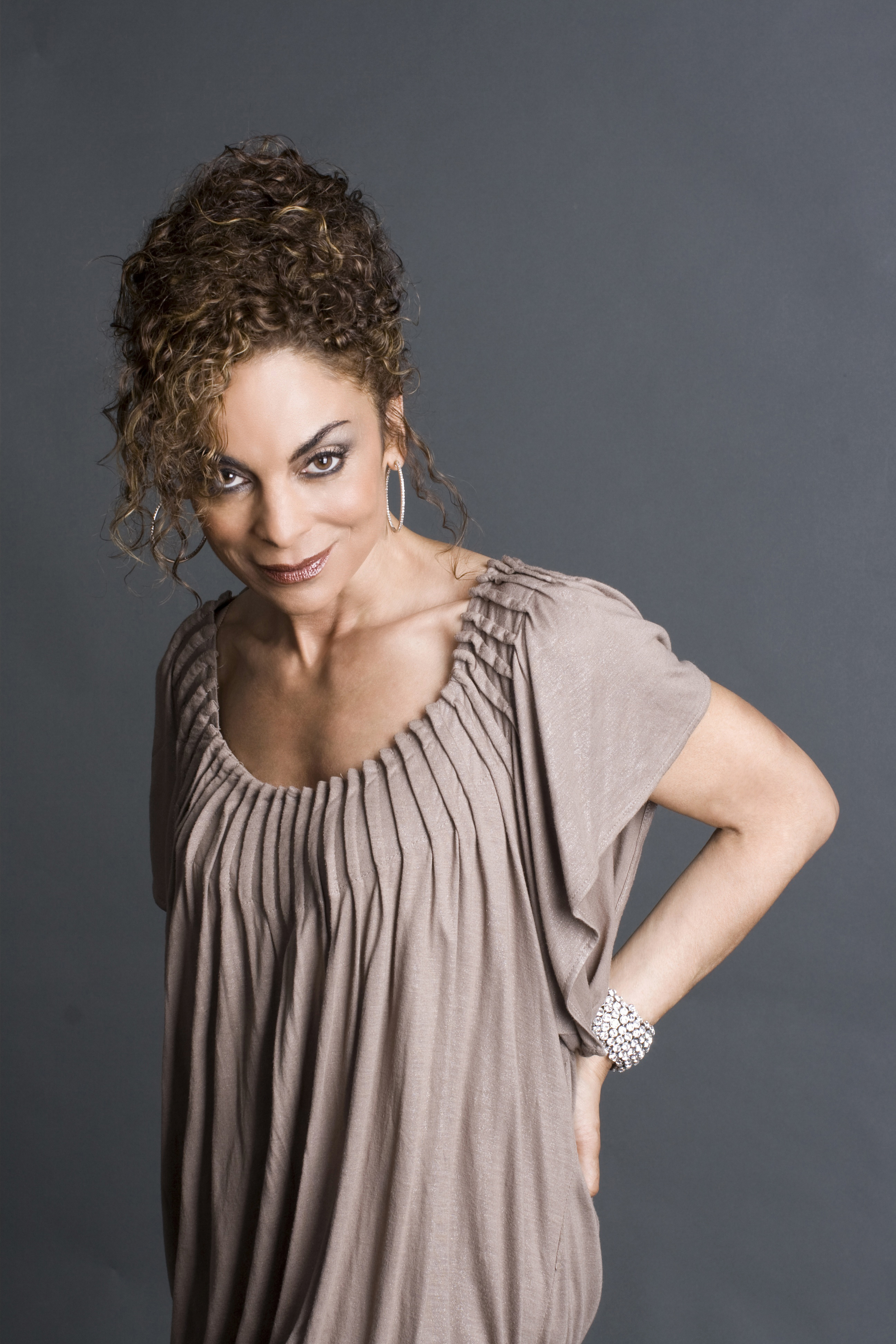
- Guy in 2010
- Born: Jasmine Chanel Guy; March 10, 1962 (age 64); Boston, Massachusetts, U.S.
- Occupations: Actress; singer; dancer
- Years active: 1982–present
- Known for: Whitley Gilbert-Wayne – A Different World; Roxy Harvey – Dead Like Me; Sawyer - Cats Don't Dance
- Spouse: Terrence Duckett (m. 1998; div. 2008)
- Children: 1
- Awards: NAACP Image Award – (1989, 1991–1993) Outstanding Lead Actress in a Comedy Series (A Different World); Primetime Emmy Award – (2023) Outstanding Actress in a Short Form Comedy or Drama Series (Chronicles of Jessica Wu)
- Musical career
- Origin: Atlanta, Georgia, U.S.
- Genres: R&B; pop; new jack swing; country
- Label: Warner Bros.

Jasmine Chanel Guy (born March 10, 1962) is an American actress and singer. She portrayed Dina in the 1988 film School Daze and Whitley Gilbert-Wayne on the NBC The Cosby Show spin-off A Different World, which originally ran from 1987 to 1993. Guy won four consecutive NAACP Image Awards from 1990 through 1993 for Outstanding Lead Actress in a Comedy Series for her role on the show. She played Roxy Harvey on Dead Like Me and as Sheila "Grams" Bennett on The Vampire Diaries. She also played the role of Gemma on Grey's Anatomy.

== Early life ==
Born in Boston, Massachusetts, to Jaye (née Resendes) and William Vincent Guy, she was raised in the affluent historic Collier Heights neighborhood of Atlanta, Georgia, where she attended Northside Performing Arts High School. Her mother, a Portuguese American, was a former high-school teacher, and her father, who was Black American, was pastor of the historic Friendship Baptist Church of Atlanta, which served as an early home to Spelman College; he was also a college instructor in philosophy and religion. At the age of 17, she moved to New York City to study dance at the Alvin Ailey American Dance Center.

== Acting career ==
=== Television roles ===
Guy began her television career with a non-speaking role as a dancer in seven episodes of the 1982 television series Fame under the direction of choreographer Debbie Allen.

Guy today remains best known for her starring role as Whitley Gilbert in the television sitcom A Different World. A spin-off of The Cosby Show and created by Bill Cosby himself, the show aired from 1987 to 1993 on NBC. Guy wrote three episodes of the show and directed one, in addition to appearing in every episode: she started as a co-star, but ended up replacing the show's original star Lisa Bonet, who left the series. Guy was nominated for and won six consecutive NAACP Image Awards for Outstanding Lead Actress in a Comedy Series.

In addition to her defining role on A Different World, she appeared in a 1991 episode of The Fresh Prince of Bel-Air as Kayla, one of Will Smith's girlfriends. In 1992, Guy appeared in CBS's Stompin' at the Savoy alongside Vanessa Williams, again under the direction of Debbie Allen, and in 1993, she played the mother of Halle Berry's character in the CBS TV mini-series Queen. This was based on Alex Haley's book Queen: The Story of an American Family, a companion volume to his earlier Roots: The Saga of an American Family, which itself had been converted to a television mini-series. In 1995, Guy appeared as Peter Burns' love interest, Caitlin Mills, on two episodes of Melrose Place, and in 1996, she appeared on Living Single, playing a psychologist treating main character Khadijah for anxiety. She also played the recurring role of Kathleen, a fallen angel, in the CBS Network drama Touched by an Angel from 1995 to 1997. In 2001 Guy contributed her considerable talents to the film version of Anne Rice’s “The Feast of All Saints”, a movie about the Free People of Color in pre Civil War New Orleans as the Creole Mambo Juliet Mercier. In 2002, Guy lent her voice to the PBS math-based animated series Cyberchase, playing Ava, the queen of the cybersite Symmetria, and made a cameo appearance on the Moesha spin-off The Parkers. In 2003, Guy played Mary Estes Peters in the HBO documentary, Unchained Memories: Readings from the Slave Narrative, a documentary which premiered during Black History Month. The slave narratives were based on the WPA slave interviews conducted during the 1930s with over 2,000 formerly enslaved people.

Guy starred alongside Ellen Muth and Mandy Patinkin in the series Dead Like Me, created by Bryan Fuller. The show ran 29 episodes over two seasons, in 2003 and 2004, on Showtime. Guy played Roxy Harvey, a meter maid turned police officer and one of the core group of grim reapers around which the series was based. Guy was nominated for the 2005 NAACP Image Award for Outstanding Supporting Actress in a Drama Series for the role. She later starred in the feature-length series sequel Dead Like Me: Life After Death, which was released on video in 2009 before being shown on the Syfy channel. In 2009, Guy performed in The People Speak, a documentary that used dramatic and musical performances of the letters, diaries, and speeches of everyday Americans, based on historian Howard Zinn's A People's History of the United States. A broad look at civil rights issues in America, The People Speak was executive produced by and seen on The History Channel. In 2010, she was seen in the second season of the Lifetime comedy series Drop Dead Diva as a judge in the episode titled "Last Year's Model," and from 2009 to 2017, Guy had a recurring role in The CW's series The Vampire Diaries. In that program, Guy played Sheila "Grams" Bennett, the grandmother of Bonnie (Katerina Graham), who proved to be a descendant of Salem Witches. Both shows were filmed in the Atlanta area. In late 2017, she appeared in the Lifetime Christmas movie Secret Santa. In the early 2020s, she appeared on the Amazon Prime series Harlem as the mother of one of the protagonists.

=== Film roles ===
Guy made her film debut in 1988 in Spike Lee's musical-drama film School Daze. She played the role of Dina, a member of the light-skinned, straight-haired Black American women of Gamma Ray, a women's auxiliary to the Gamma Phi Gamma fraternity. Filming on School Daze was completed before she joined the cast of A Different World. During the following year, she appeared as Dominique La Rue in Harlem Nights starring Eddie Murphy (who also directed), Richard Pryor, and Redd Foxx. In 1997, she provided the speaking voice of Sawyer in the Warner Bros. animated film Cats Don't Dance. In 2011, she appeared in the film October Baby. In 2015, she appeared in the film Big Stone Gap with Ashley Judd, Patrick Wilson, Jenna Elfman, Anthony LaPaglia, Jane Krakowski, and Whoopi Goldberg. She starred in the short film My Nephew Emmett, which won the Student Academy Award and was nominated for the Academy Award for Best Live Action Short Film in 2018.

=== Stage ===
In 1987, Guy had a starring role in the off-Broadway hit musical Beehive, before traveling to France to appear in a similar musical review. Guy has performed in several Broadway productions and national tours, including as Crow in The Wiz, Mickey in Leader of the Pack, Betty Rizzo in Grease, and as Velma Kelly in Chicago. On April 6, 2009, Playbill reported on Guy's return to the stage, starring in the True Colors Theatre Company production of Pearl Cleage's Blues for an Alabama Sky. Directed by Andrea Frye, the show was a last minute addition to the company's season and opened May 4 in Atlanta. Blues came on the heels of Guy's held-over run in True Colors' Miss Evers' Boys, which co-starred TC Carson of Living Single.

Guy directed the world premiere of I Dream in July 2010 on the Alliance Stage of the Woodruff Arts Centre in Atlanta. Also in 2010, Guy was a member of the cast of the Alabama Shakespeare Festival and the Alliance Theatre Company co-production of Pearl Cleage's The Nacirema Society Requests the Honor of Your Presence at a Celebration of Their First One-Hundred Years. The production ran September 24 through October 3 at the Festival in Montgomery, Alabama, before moving to Atlanta's Alliance Theatre for performances October 20 through November 14. In early 2011, Guy directed George C. Wolfe's The Colored Museum for True Colors, and in June 2011, Guy costarred with Kenny Leon in their production of Sam Shepard's play Fool For Love at The Balzer Theater at Herren's in Atlanta, Georgia. In August 2010, Guy had joined Kenny Leon's True Colors Theatre Company in an off stage role as the company's Producing Director. In announcing the hire, True Colors said Guy's full-time position would be both administrative and artistic, and both local and national. Guy continues to contribute to the company on stage as well.

== Music career ==
During the run of A Different World, Guy released her self-titled debut album in 1990. The album peaked at No. 143 on the US Top 200 Album Chart and spawned three hit singles: "Try Me" (US R&B No. 14); "Another Like My Lover" (US No. 66, US R&B No. 9); and "Just Want to Hold You" (US No. 34, US R&B No. 27), with the last single cracking the main US Top 40 singles chart.

== Personal life ==
Guy had a close friendship with rapper Tupac Shakur. They met through a mutual friend, actress Jada Pinkett, during his guest appearance on the sitcom A Different World in 1993. Shakur recuperated at Guy's home after he was shot in 1994. Guy also appeared in his 1995 music video "Temptations" and later wrote his mother's biography, Afeni Shakur: Evolution of a Revolutionary.

Guy married Terrence Duckett in August 1998, and the couple had one child, a daughter named Imani. On April 8, 2008, People reported that Guy and Duckett were divorcing after ten years of marriage due to irreconcilable differences. Guy and her daughter then moved to Guy's childhood hometown of Atlanta.

== Filmography ==
=== Film ===
Year	Title	Role	Notes
1988	School Daze	Dina	
1989	Runaway	Charlene 'Charlie'	TV movie
1989	Harlem Nights	Dominique La Rue	
1990	A Killer Among Us	Theresa Hopkins	TV movie
1992	Stompin' at the Savoy	Alice	TV movie
1993	Boy Meets Girl	Lena	TV movie
1995	Klash	Blossom	
1997	Cats Don't Dance	Sawyer (voice)	
1997	Perfect Crime	Captain Darnell Russell	TV movie
1998	Madeline	Narrator (voice)	
1999	Guinevere	Linda	
1999	Lillie	Sylvia	
2000	The Law of Enclosures	Tina	
2000	Diamond Men	Tina	
2001	Feast of All Saints	Juliet Mercier	TV movie
2001	Dying on the Edge	Micki	
2002	Carrie	Claire Murphy	TV movie
2006	The Heart Specialist	Aunt Burnetta	
2007	Rwanda Rising	Ephigenie Mukanyandwi (voice)	
2008	Tru Loved	Cynthia	
2009	Dead Like Me: Life After Death	Roxy Harvey	Video
2010	Stomp the Yard: Homecoming	Janice	
2010	Change in the Wind	Bessie Jordan (voice)	
2011	Blossoms for Clara	Clara Dukes	Short
2011	October Baby	Nurse Mary	
2012	Kasha and the Zulu King	Ngazi	TV movie
2012	What About Us?	Arlene Gomes	Short
2013	Scary Movie 5	Mrs. Brooks	
2014	My Other Mother	Evelyn	TV movie
2014	Big Stone Gap	Leah Grimes	
2014	Ir/Reconcilable	Robye	Short
2015	Sick People	Beatrice	
2016	Chasing Waterfalls	Salma	TV movie
2016	The Substitute Spy	G11	
2017	My Nephew Emmett	Elizabeth Wright	Short
2017	Wrapped Up In Christmas	Elise Nash	TV movie
2018	The Christmas Pact	Nadia	TV movie
2019	Illegal Rose	Rose	Short
2020	Open	Betty	TV movie
2021	Liam White: The Forgettable Life of Liam White	Rene White	
2022	Vanished: Searching for My Sister	Detective Hill	TV movie
2022	A Wesley Christmas	Sylvia Wesley	
2022	The Lady Makers	Emma	
2023	A Wesley Christmas Wedding	Sylvia Wesley	TV movie
2024	Not Another Church Movie	Miss Mildew	
2025	Noah's Arc: The Movie	Nana Ladonya	
2026	Thou Shalt Not Commit Adultery	Anita Pierce	TV movie

=== Television ===
Year	Title	Role	Notes
1982	Fame	Fame Dancer (uncredited)	Recurring Cast: Season 1
1986	The Equalizer	Gloria	Episode: "Out of the Past"
1987	At Mother's Request	Bank Teller	Episode: "Part 1 & 2"
1987-1993	A Different World	Whitley Gilbert-Wayne	Main Cast
1990	Soul Train	Herself	Episode: "Snap/E.U./Jasmine Guy"
1991	The Fresh Prince of Bel-Air	Kayla Samuels	Episode: "Love at First Fight"
1993	Alex Haley's Queen	Easter	Episode: "Part 1-3"
1994	A Century of Women	Family Member	Episode: "Part 1 & 2"
1995	Melrose Place	Caitlin Mills	Recurring Cast: Season 3
1995	NYPD Blue	LaVonna Runnels	Episode: "Heavin' Can Wait"
1995	Happily Ever After: Fairy Tales for Every Child	Jonae (voice)	Episode: "Rumpelstiltskin"
1995-1997	Touched by an Angel	Kathleen	Recurring Cast: Season 2-3
1996	Living Single	Dr. Jessica Bryce	Episode: "Shrink to Fit"
1996	America's Dream	Elna Du Vaul	Episode: "The Boy Who Painted Christ Black"
1996	The Outer Limits	Captain Teri Washington	Episode: "The Heist"
1996	Lois & Clark: The New Adventures of Superman	Angela Winters	Episode: "The People vs. Lois Lane"
1996-2003	Intimate Portrait	Herself	Recurring Guest
1997	Malcolm & Eddie	Paige	Episode: "Two Men and a Baby"
1998	Celebrity Profile	Herself	Episode: "Diahann Carroll"
1998-2000	Linc's	Courtney Goode	Guest: Season 1, Recurring Cast: Season 2
1999	Any Day Now	Aunt Kiki	Episode: "Blue"
1999	Ladies Man	Allegra	Recurring Cast: Season 1
1999	Partners	Amanda	Episode: "A Beautiful Day"
2000	Happily Ever After: Fairy Tales for Every Child	Frog Princess Lylah (voice)	Episode: "The Frog Princess"
2001	Journeys in Black	Herself	Episode: "Patti LaBelle"
2001	Between the Lions	Herself	Episode: "Humph! Humph! Humph!"
2002	Inside TV Land	Herself	Episode: "Inside TV Land: Taboo TV"
2002	The Parkers	Delilah	Episode: "Lights, Camera, Action"
2002-2004	Cyberchase	Various Voices (voice)	Guest Cast: Season: 1-3
2003-2004	Dead Like Me	Roxy Harvey	Main Cast
2005	Between the Lions	Herself	Episode: "Pigs, Pigs, Pigs/The Three Little Pigs"
2006	That's So Raven	Pistáche	Episode: "Checkin' Out"
2009	My Parents, My Sister & Me	Keela Goldman	Episode: "Starting Over"
2009-2017	The Vampire Diaries	Sheila Bennett	Recurring Cast: Season: 1 & 4–5 & 8, Guest: Season: 3
2010	Andrew Young Presents	Bessie Jordan (voice)	Episode: "Change in the Wind"
2010	Drop Dead Diva	Judge Nona Daniels	Episode: "Last Year's Model"
2012	Let's Stay Together	Herself	Episode: "Dancing with the Stars"
2014	Oprah: Where Are They Now?	Herself	Episode: "A Different World Cast Reunion"
2014-2015	If Loving You Is Wrong	Mattaline	Recurring Cast: Season 1
2015-2016	Unsung Hollywood	Herself	Recurring Guest
2016	Being	Herself	Episode: "Jasmine Guy"
2016	Zoe Ever After	Barbara Jean Johnson	Episode: "2 Weddings and an Ass Whooping"
2016-2017	K.C. Undercover	Erica	Recurring Cast: Season 2
2017	Who Killed Tupac?	Herself	Episode: "Devil in a Red Suit"
2017-2018	Superstition	Aunt Nancy	Recurring Cast
2017-2018	The Quad	Ella Grace Caldwell	Recurring Cast
2019	Grey's Anatomy	Gemma Larson	Guest: Season 15, Recurring Cast: Season 16
2021	Reunion Road Trip	Herself	Episode: "It's a Different World"
2021	History of the Sitcom	Herself	Episode: "Facing Race" & "Freaks, Geeks & Outsiders"
2021-2025	Harlem	Patricia Joseph	Recurring Cast: Season 1-2, Guest: Season 3
2022	Tales	Ms. Gloria	Episode: "Hot In Here"
2023	Chronicles of Jessica Wu	Barbara Baldwin	Main Cast: Season 3
2025	Grosse Pointe Garden Society	Catherine's Mom	Recurring Cast
2025	Poker Face	Norma Kazinsky	Episode: “The Game is a Foot”
2026	A Different World	Whitley Gilbert-Wayne	Main Cast

=== Music videos ===
Year	Song title	Artist
1986	"Someone like You"	Sylvester
1989	"Liberian Girl"	Michael Jackson
1990	"Lift Every Voice and Sing"	Melba Moore
1995	"Temptations"	2Pac

== Discography ==
=== Albums ===
- Jasmine Guy (1990)

=== Singles ===
- "Try Me" (1990)
- "Another Like My Lover" (1991)
- "Just Want to Hold You" (1991)
- "Don't Want Money" (1991)
