= What We Found (film) =

- Film poster
- Directed by: Ben Hickernell
- Written by: Ben Hickernell
- Produced by: Ben Hickernell; Atit Shah; Stephen Gifford; Rick Sebeck
- Starring: Jordan Hall; Elizabeth Mitchell; James Ransone; Brandon Larracuente; Oona Laurence; Yetide Badaki
- Cinematography: Steve Buckwalter
- Distributed by: Freestyle Digital Media
- Release date: August 4, 2020
- Country: United States
- Language: English

What We Found is a 2020 American thriller film written and directed by Ben Hickernell and starring Elizabeth Mitchell, James Ransone, Brandon Larracuente, Oona Laurence, Jordan Hall and Yetide Badaki.

== Cast ==
- Jordan Hall as Marcus Jackson
- Oona Laurence as Holly
- Julian Shatkin as Grant
- Giorgia Whigham as Cassie
- Yetide Badaki as Alex
- Brandon Larracuente as Clay Howard
- Elizabeth Mitchell as Katherine Hillman
- James Ransone as Steve Mohler
- Casey Hartnett as Emily

== Release ==
The film was released on DVD and VOD on August 4, 2020.

== Reception ==
Barbara Shulgasser-Parker of Common Sense Media awarded the film three stars out of five.
