= Just Want to Hold You =

Single by Jasmine Guy featuring James Ingram

from the album Jasmine Guy
- B-side: "I Don't Have to Justify"
- Released: 1991
- Recorded: 1990
- Genre: R&B
- Length: 4:10
- Label: Warner Bros.
- Songwriters: Melanie Andrews; Tony Andrews, Cal Harris Jr.
- Producer: Rex Salas

Jasmine Guy featuring James Ingram singles chronology
| "Another Like My Lover" (1991) | "Just Want to Hold You" (1991) | "Don't Want Money" (1991) |

"Just Want to Hold You" is a song by American singer and actress Jasmine Guy, released in 1991 by Warner Bros. Records, as the third single from her only and self-titled debut album (1990). The song was a top-thirty hit on the US Billboard Hot R&B Singles chart and peaked at numbers 34 and 43 on the Billboard Hot 100 and Cash Box Top 100 charts.

== Track listings and formats ==
- US 7" vinyl single

A. "Just Want to Hold You" – 4:10
B. "I Don't Have to Justify" – 4:23

- US CD single
1. "Just Want to Hold You" (Album Version) – 4:10
- US Cassette single

A. "Just Want to Hold You" – 4:10
B. "I Don't Have to Justify" – 4:23

== Credits ==
- Vocals – Jasmine Guy
- Backing Vocals – Fred White,Jasmine Guy, Philip Ingram, Valerie Pinkston Mayo
- Vocals [Guest Vocalist] – James Ingram
- Executive-Producer – Jasmine Guy, Leonard Richardson
- Bass [Synth Bass] – Darron Williams
- Drums – Derek Organ
- Producer, Keyboards – Rex Salas
- Keyboards – Chuckii Booker
- Writer – Cal Harris, Jr., Melanie Andrews, Tony Andrews
- Guitar – Thomas Organ
- Engineer – Dave Koenig, Rob Seifert
- Mixed – Dave Koenig

== Charts ==
=== Weekly charts ===
| Chart (1991) | Peak position |
|---|---|
| US Billboard Hot 100 | 34 |
| US Hot R&B/Hip-Hop Songs (Billboard) | 27 |
| US Cash Box Top 100 | 43 |
