= Craig Kirkwood =

American lawyer and former actor (born 1974)

- Born: August 10, 1974 (age 52); Los Angeles, California, U.S.
- Occupations: Actor; attorney
- Years active: Acting (1993–2006); Law (2008–present)
- Spouse: Shaunte Caraballo (married 2023-present) Katie Kimberling (married 2005-2018)

Craig Kirkwood (born August 10, 1974) is an American lawyer and former actor. He is best known for his role as Jerry "Rev" Harris in the 2000 film Remember the Titans.

== Career ==
Kirkwood was born in Los Angeles, California. He made his acting debut in a Levi's commercial after being hired by his aunt who is a casting director, Amy Sobo. After enrolling in high-school drama classes, in 1993 he was cast in the NBC Saturday morning sitcom Running the Halls, which ran for one season. He went on to guest star on My So-Called Life, Family Matters, The Parent 'Hood, The Fresh Prince of Bel-Air, Sister, Sister, The Burning Zone, The Steve Harvey Show, Beyond Belief: Fact or Fiction, Mercy Point, Nikki, JAG, It's All Relative and Courting Alex.

In 1997, Kirkwood co-starred in the TV series Deepwater Black, which ended after one season.

Kirkwood's most notable role to date was as Jerry "Rev" Harris in the 2000 Disney film Remember the Titans. Kirkwood co-starred in Why Do Fools Fall in Love and the Disney Channel Original Movie Hounded with Tahj Mowry (Nominated for an Emmy Award for Best Supporting Actor - Comedy or Musical). He appeared in the films Slash, Dead Above Ground, Cats and Mice, Rain and Calendar Girls. He has performed in theater for plays including Little Shop of Horrors, Grease and Big River.

Kirkwood graduated from Loyola Law School in 2008 and is now a Los Angeles County counsel.

== Filmography ==
=== Film ===
Year	Title	Role	Notes
1998	Why Do Fools Fall in Love	Eddie Williams	
2000	Remember the Titans	Jerry "Rev." Harris	
2002	Slash	Keith	
2002	Dead Above Ground	Jason Johnson	
2003	Cats and Mice	Buddy	
2003	Rain	Private Jordan	
2003	Calendar Girls	Bellboy	

=== Television ===
Year	Title	Role	Notes
1993	Running the Halls	Miles Taylor	Main role, 13 episodes
1994	Cosmic Slop	Lenny	Television film; segment: "Space Traders"
1994	My So-Called Life	Sam	Episode: "The Substitute"
1994	My So-Called Life	Troy	Episode: "Self-Esteem"
1995	Family Matters	Gary Menteer	Episode: "Cheers Looking at You, Kid"
1995	The Parent 'Hood	Daryl Cooper	Episode: "Nice Guys Finish Last" (S1:E11)
1996	CBS Schoolbreak Special		Episode: "Crosstown"
1996	The Fresh Prince of Bel-Air	Frederick	Episode: "The Butler's Son Did It"
1996	Sister, Sister	Michael	Episode: "Big Twin On Campus"
1996	The Burning Zone	Daryl Luge	Episode: "Arms of Fire" (S1:E4)
1997	Mission Genesis	Zak	Main role, 13 episodes
1998	The Steve Harvey Show	Sylvester	Episode: "Breakfast with Tiffany"
1998	Beyond Belief: Fact or Fiction	James	Episode: "A Joyful Noise"
1998	Mercy Point	N/A	Episodes: "Opposing Views", "Last Resort"
2001	Hounded	Mike Martin	Television movie (Disney Channel)
2001	Nikki	Charlie	Episode: "Vaya Con Nikki"
2002	JAG	Corporal Sean Stiles	Episodes: "Family Business", "Offensive Action", "Ready or Not"
2004	It's All Relative	Matt	Episode: "Philip in a China Shop"
2006	Courting Alex	Matt	Episode: "Everything I Know About Men" (unaired pilot)
