= Mother and Child Reunion (disambiguation) =

"Mother and Child Reunion" is a 1972 song by Paul Simon.

Mother and Child Reunion may also refer to:

== Television ==
- "Mother and Child Reunion" (Degrassi: The Next Generation), two-part episode of Degrassi: The Next Generation, season 1
- "Mother and Child Reunion" (The Simpsons), season 32 The Simpsons episode
- "Mother and Child Reunion", episode of The Steve Harvey Show
- "Mother and Child Reunion" season 8 Happy Days episode

== Other ==
- An occasional name for restaurant dishes that include both a chicken and egg, including oyakodon
