= Senta Moses =

American actress (born 1973)

- Born: Senta Michelle Moses; August 8, 1973 (age 53); Elmhurst, Illinois, U.S.
- Occupation: Actress
- Years active: 1974–present
- Spouse: Joseph Mikan (m. 2015)

Senta Michelle Moses (born August 8, 1973) is an American actress. She is most well known for her co-starring role as Phoebe, the lab assistant/co-host in the children's series Beakman's World (1996–1997), she also portrayed Winnifred Leeds in General Hospital (2009), Lizzie in Greek (2008–2009), and Tracy McCallister in Home Alone (1990) and Home Alone 2: Lost in New York (1992).

== Early life ==
Moses was born on August 8, 1973, in Elmhurst, Illinois. She is of Italian and Lebanese descent.

== Career ==
She has been in show business since she was six months old appearing in a diaper commercial—which she refers to as "embarrassing". She has since appeared in more than 100 national commercials—including ones for Teleflora, Wendy's and Toyota.

At age seven, she landed the role of Molly in the National Touring Company of Annie, appearing in 487 performances. While pursuing her high school diploma at the Chicago Academy for the Arts, Moses co-starred in the 1990 feature film Home Alone and Home Alone 2: Lost in New York (1992), as one of the older cousins of Kevin McCallister (Macaulay Culkin). After graduation at age 16, Moses moved to California to attend University of Southern California's School of Theatre.

Moses has appeared in the feature films Choose Connor, Can't Hardly Wait, D.C. Cab, Scream Queen, The Kiss, and Tequila Body Shots. Her television credits include Strong Medicine, The Education of Max Bickford, Everybody Loves Raymond, The Division, Touched by an Angel, and Party of Five has had recurring roles on My So-Called Life, Sister Sister, Greek and General Hospital. In 1993, Moses was a series regular on the NBC Saturday morning sitcom Running the Halls, the series lasted one season.

Moses was also in an improv troupe "Danger Danger".

== Personal life ==
Moses married television editor Joseph Mikan on July 19, 2015, in Burbank, California. She currently lives in Los Angeles.

== Filmography ==
Film
Year	Title	Role	Notes
1980	The Blues Brothers	Dancer outside Ray's	Uncredited
1982	Things Are Tough All Over	Kid in Laundromat	
1983	D.C. Cab	Ambassador's Daughter	
1990	Home Alone	Tracy McCallister	
1992	Home Alone 2: Lost in New York	Tracy McCallister	Nominated – Young Artist Award for Best Youth Actress Leading Role in a Motion Picture Comedy (1994)
1996	Life After Tomorrow (documentary)	Herself	
1999	Tequila Body Shots	Linda	
2001	Dodgeball	Rose	Short film
2001	Best Friends	Tara	Short film
2003	Scream Queen	Missy	Direct-to-video
2003	The Kiss	Julianna	Direct-to-video
2007	Choose Connor	Stacy	also known as The Politician
2008	Boiler Maker	Willow	
2010	10 Years Later	Becky Clark	
2011	Love, Gloria	Bonnie	
2013	Slightly Single in L.A.	Vanessa	

Television
Year	Title	Role	Notes
1984	Lottery!		Season 1, episode 14 – "Miami: Sharing"
1986	ABC Weekend Special	Rebecca	"The Day the Kids Took Over"
1991	Who's the Boss?	Taylor	Season 8, episode 10 – "Field of Screams"
1992	Baby Talk		Season 2, episode 14 – "Requiem for a Lightweight"
1993	Running the Halls	Nikki Watson	13 episodes
1994	California Dreams	Rosie Melcher	Season 3, episode 5 – "Yoko, Oh No!"
1994–95	My So-Called Life	Delia Fisher	3 episodes; recurring role
1995	Party of Five	Madeline	Season 1, episode 21 – "All-Nighters"
1995	Step by Step	Lauren	Season 5, episode 9 – "The Wall"
1996	Kirk	Tina Balducci	Season 1, episode 13 – "The Spare"
1996	CBS Schoolbreak Special		Season 13, episode 3 – "Crosstown"
1996	Maybe This Time	Felice	Season 1, episode 16 – "Stand Up Your Man"
1997	Born Into Exile	Lauren	Film
1996–97	Beakman's World	Phoebe	26 episodes
1997–98	Sister Sister	Dot	6 episodes; recurring role
1998	Touched by an Angel	Katy	Season 4, episode 25 – "Last Dance"
1998	Perfect Prey	Lady #3	Film
1998	Everybody Loves Raymond	Lisa	Season 3, episode 3 – "The Sitter"
1998	One World	Natalie Zuckerman	Season 1, episode 8 – "Crushes, Lies & Zuckerman"
1999	Sorority	Megan	Pilot
1999	Vengeance Unlimited	Gina	Season 1, episode 14 – "Critical"
2000	Opposite Sex	Petra	Season 1, episode 8 – "The Car Episode"
2000	Bull	Cookie Rutigliano	4 episodes; recurring role
2001	The Education of Max Bickford	Ms. Pratt	season 1, episode 1 – "Pilot"
2003	The Division	Lauren	Season 3, episode 5 – "Testimonial"
2005	Strong Medicine	Delia Pryor	Season 6, episode 1 – "New Blood"
2007	Ghost Whisperer	Alyssa Adams	Season 2, episode 17 – "The Walk-In"
2007	The Kidnapping	Karen	Film; also known as Black Friday
2008	Bones	April Presa	Season 3, episode 10 – "The Man in the Mud"
2009	General Hospital	Winifred Leeds	42 episodes
2008–09	Greek	Lizzi	5 episodes; recurring role
2009	The Wishing Well	Michelle	Film
2010	Castle	Michele Langford	Season 2, episode 14 – "The Third Man"
2011	Working Class	Megan	Season 1, episode 11 – "Short, Then Sweet"
2012	The Mentalist	Tiffany Stark	Season 5, episode 9 – "Black Cherry"
2012	Rizzoli & Isles	Ruby Burke	Season 3, episode 13 – "Virtual Love"
2015	Girl Meets World	Alterna-Cory	Season 2, episode 1 – "Girl Meets Gravity"
2014–16	Faking It	Principal Penelope	Recurring role
2015–16	Bella and the Bulldogs	Mrs. Silverstein	Recurring role
2018	Badge of a Quitter	Meg	6 episodes
2020	Little Fires Everywhere	Ms. Devore	Season 1, Episode 2 – "Seeds and All" Also creator and writer
