= Netfa Perry =

American actress

- Born: Netfa Ifeyinwa Perry; Manhattan, New York, U.S.
- Occupation: Actress
- Website: http://www.netfaperry.com/

Netfa Perry (born Netfa Ifeyinwa Perry) is an American actress. She starred as Sara on The WB comedy television series The Steve Harvey Show. She has also guest starred on various television shows.

== Filmography ==
- The Steve Harvey Show as Sara
- Free of Eden, Showtime movie
