= Running the Halls =

American television sitcom series

- Created by: Steve Slavkin
- Written by: Steve Slavkin
- Directed by: Randall Miller; Troy Miller
- Starring: Lackey Bevis; Laurie Fortier; Richard Hayes; Craig Kirkwood; Trevor Lissauer; Senta Moses; Richard Speight Jr. Pamela Bowen
- Country of origin: United States
- Original language: English
- No. of seasons: 1
- No. of episodes: 13

Production
- Production companies: Steve Slavkin Productions; NBC Productions

Original release
- Network: NBC
- Release: September 11 – December 4, 1993

Running the Halls is an American television sitcom that aired on NBC's TNBC Saturday morning lineup. The series was created by Steve Slavkin. The show consisted of 13 episodes, which aired from September 11 to December 4, 1993, and aired immediately following Saved by the Bell: The New Class during the latter show's first season.

== Premise ==
The show followed the exploits of a group of teens attending Middlefield Academy, an East Coast boarding school, and the ongoing hijinks that occur as they experience life away from home. Los Angeles Times reviewer Lynne Heffley described the show as "buoyant" and "fun".

== Cast ==
- Lackey Bevis as Molloy Simpson
- Laurie Fortier as Holiday Friedman
- Richard Hayes as Andy McBain
- Craig Kirkwood as Miles Taylor
- Trevor Lissauer as David Reese
- Senta Moses as Nikki Watson
- Richard Speight Jr. as Mark G. 'The Shark' Stark
- Pamela Bowen as Headmistress Karen Gilman

== Episodes ==
No.	Title	Directed by	Written by	Original release date	Prod. code
1	"The Arrival"	Unknown	Unknown	September 11, 1993	6302
2	"The First Mixer"	Unknown	Unknown	September 18, 1993	6301
3	"Dance Squad"	Unknown	Unknown	September 25, 1993	6303
4	"The Rowing Competition"	Unknown	Unknown	October 2, 1993	6305
5	"Taylor Grades McBain"	Mike Finney	Alan Silberberg	October 9, 1993	6304
6	"The Big Kiss"	Unknown	Unknown	October 16, 1993	6308
7	"The Term Paper"	Unknown	Unknown	October 23, 1993	6307
8	"Shark Moves In"	Unknown	Unknown	October 30, 1993	6309
9	"McBain Chokes"	Unknown	Unknown	November 6, 1993	6310
10	"The Conductor"	Unknown	Unknown	November 13, 1993	6311
11	"The Watch"	Unknown	Unknown	November 20, 1993	6306
12	"The Break Up"	Unknown	Unknown	November 27, 1993	6312
13	"Rock Reunion"	Unknown	Unknown	December 4, 1993	6313
