= Hounded (2001 film) =

2001 American film

- VHS cover
- Genre: Adventure; Comedy
- Written by: Don Calame; Chris Conroy
- Directed by: Neal Israel
- Starring: Tahj Mowry; Shia LaBeouf; Craig Kirkwood; Steven Bendik; Sara Paxton; Rachelle Carson; Ed Begley Jr.
- Music by: David Kitay
- Country of origin: United States
- Original language: English

Production
- Producer: Don Schain
- Cinematography: Robert Seaman
- Editor: Lee Haxall
- Running time: 92 minutes
- Production company: Gaylord Films

Original release
- Network: Disney Channel
- Release: April 13, 2001

Hounded is a 2001 American comedy film released as a Disney Channel Original Movie and starring Tahj Mowry, Craig Kirkwood, Sara Paxton, Shia LaBeouf and Ed Begley, Jr. The film premiered on Disney Channel on April 13, 2001. It was filmed in Salt Lake City, Utah at the Madeleine Choir School campus.

== Plot ==
Jay Martin is a 13-year-old student at Columbus Hall competing for a scholarship to the prestigious Donald Peterson Academy with rival classmate and bully Ronny Van Dusen. The scholarship is the only one of its kind available, and if Jay doesn't obtain it, he will be sent to the all-boys Starkwell Military Academy his older brother, Mike, attends upstate, where their late father was a former student and teacher. Jay plans to study art at Peterson and he's prepared a presentation that he hopes will earn him the scholarship. The headmaster of Columbus and Ronny's father, Ward Van Dusen, confiscates Jay's presentation notecards because they contained drawings depicting him as a wolf in disguise. After Ward leaves the notecards lying around his office, Ronny copies the presentation and wins the scholarship by using it in the contest. When Jay brings this up with Ward, he expresses intentions to look into it, only for Jay to later overhear Ward instructing his son to get rid of any evidence he plagiarized the speech.

Jay breaks into Ronny's pool house while the Van Dusen family is at the award ceremony in order to take his presentation back and prove to the judges it was stolen. However, Ward's wife, Eliza's show dog, Camille, discovers Jay and follows him home after she nearly gets him caught by their maid. When the Van Dusens return home, they find their maid shaken up and Camille missing, and based on the maid's recount of seeing a disguised Jay leave the pool house, they believe she has been dognapped. Camille goes crazy and wrecks the Martin's home when she goes too long without her anti-anxiety medication. After Jay spends hours trying to comfort the dog, Camille withstands no more and explodes.

Mike comes home from school while the boys' mother is away taking care of their injured aunt and finds the house a mess and Camille with a nervous breakdown. After Jay confesses what happened with the speech and the dog, the two try to buy time to get her back home. After Ward disavows any knowledge of Ronny's theft and plagiarism to Mike during a phone call, Mike reveals to Jay that Ward has had a long history of nepotism ever since he was named headmaster; during Mike's time at Columbus, Ward cut him from the baseball team to make room for his nephew, who had never even played the sport in his life. Knowing how hard Jay worked to try to obtain the Peterson scholarship, the two brothers seek to avenge their family's honor. Ward is then visited by his father-in-law, the former headmaster of Columbus Hall, Armand Columbus, who orders him to get his daughter's dog back or Ward will lose his job. Ward is hesitant, at first, having hated Camille to begin with due to his allergies, but agrees to numerous bizarre acts requested by Jay and Mike just to get Camille home and Armand off his back. Over time, Camille calms down and accepts Jay as a friend.

Reaching his limit, Ward finally calls the police to tap into the calls he usually received from the two boys (who used a voice disguiser). Jay and Mike come up with a plan and frame Ronny for the dog's absence. The plan works thanks to a strategy where the Van Dusens and the police find Camille in Ronny's pool house, as well as the voice changer they used for further incrimination. When Ward confronts Ronny over Camille's kidnapping, assuming that he did it because Ward refused to buy him a brand-new BMX bike and Ronny planned to use the ransom money to get it himself, Armand sees through the whole story, prompting him to say "the apple doesn't fall very far from the tree" in realization of Ward's nepotism during his tenure as headmaster and that he has passed his corrupt behavior on to Ronny as a result.

In the end, after investigating further and uncovering the full truth about Ronny and Ward's misdeeds, Armand comes out of retirement and retakes his old position as headmaster of the school while demoting Ward to secretary. The scholarship competition is reopened and Jay is rightfully awarded the Peterson scholarship, while Ronny is sent to Starkwell as punishment for plagiarizing his speech and "kidnapping" Camille, and Camille is revealed to be expecting puppies, with Eliza offering Jay one of them. Because Eliza plans to keep most of the puppies, Ward is forced to move into the pool house due to his allergies while Ronny is away at school. While Ronny is doing drills at Starkwell, he is surprised to find his instructor is Mike, who plans to discipline him harder than the other cadets.

== Cast ==
- Tahj Mowry as Jason "Jay" Martin, a 13-year-old student attending Columbus Hall, a private middle school and wanting to study art at the Peterson Academy.
- Craig Kirkwood as Michael "Mike" Martin, Jay's older brother, a former student at Columbus Hall and a drill sergeant at Starkwell Military Academy.
- Shia LaBeouf as Ronald "Ronny" Van Dusen, Jay's rival classmate and a bully.
- Sara Paxton as Tracy Richburg, a wheelchair user and Jay's best friend.
- Steven Bendik as Bill Lipka, Jay's best friend.
- Rachelle Carson as Eliza Van Dusen (née Columbus), Ronny Van Dusen's mother.
- Ed Begley, Jr. as Ward Van Dusen, Ronny Van Dusen's father and headmaster of Columbus Hall.
- Tony Larimer as Armand Columbus, Eliza Van Dusen's father, Ronny's maternal grandfather and the original headmaster of Columbus Hall.
- Melinda Haynes as Mrs. Martin, Jay and Mike's widowed mother.
- Irene Santiago as Adele, the Van Dusens' maid.
- Scott Wilkinsen as Colonel Douglas, Mike's commanding officer at Starkwell.

== Release ==
=== Critical reception ===
On Rotten Tomatoes, the film has an approval rating of 47% based on 538 reviews. It has only 2 comments and Conner R calls the film "Just an incredibly weird and campy movie about dog stealing. About the only noteworthy aspect is the fact that Shia Labeouf plays a hilariously evil rich kid."

=== Home media ===
A VHS was released by Walt Disney Video on March 5, 2002.
