= The Steve Harvey Show =

American television sitcom (1996–2002)

- Official series logo, that was used on Sony Pictures' website in 2006, Tubi and Throwback TV YouTube channel.
- Also known as: Steve Harvey
- Genre: Sitcom
- Created by: Winifred Hervey
- Directed by: Stan Lathan
- Starring: Steve Harvey; Cedric the Entertainer; Merlin Santana; Tracy Vilar; William Lee Scott; Netfa Perry; Wendy Raquel Robinson; Terri J. Vaughn; Ariyan A. Johnson; Lori Beth Denberg
- Music by: Patrice Rushen
- Country of origin: United States
- Original language: English
- No. of seasons: 6
- No. of episodes: 122 (list of episodes)

Production
- Executive producers: Brad Grey; Bernie Brillstein; Winifred Hervey; Stan Lathan; Jeffrey Duteil (season 2); Walter Allen Bennett Jr. (seasons 3–4)
- Camera setup: Videotape; Multi-camera
- Running time: 22–24 minutes
- Production companies: Winifred Hervey Productions; Stan Lathan Television; Brad Grey Television (Note: Credited as Brillstein-Grey Communications (seasons 1–2) and Brillstein-Grey Entertainment (seasons 3–4).); Universal Studios Network Programming (seasons 4–6); Columbia TriStar Television Distribution (Note: Credited as Columbia Pictures Television (season 1).)

Original release
- Network: The WB
- Release: August 25, 1996 – February 17, 2002

The Steve Harvey Show is an American television sitcom created by Winifred Hervey and directed by Stan Lathan that aired on The WB from August 25, 1996, to February 17, 2002, with a total of 122 half-hour episodes spanning six seasons.

== Synopsis ==
Steve Hightower (Steve Harvey) is a 1970s funk legend and a very successful music star with his musical group who is now a music teacher/vice principal at Booker T. Washington High School on Chicago's West Side. Budget cutbacks meant Steve also had to teach drama and art, much to his surprise. Cedric Robinson (Cedric the Entertainer) is a coach at the high school, and Steve's longtime best friend. The principal of Booker T. Washington High is Steve's former classmate, Regina Grier (Wendy Raquel Robinson), whom Steve affectionately calls "Piggy", because she was overweight in childhood.

Steve forms a strong bond with two of his students: Romeo Santana (Merlin Santana), a stylish, self-absorbed ladies' man, and the equally vacuous Stanley Kuznocki, nicknamed Bullethead (William Lee Scott) – acting as their mentor, and gradually, accepts them as friends.

In season 2, the show introduced a new character, a secretary named Lovita Jenkins (Terri J. Vaughn), a woman who is fundamentally in the good mood, but nonetheless, considerably unrefined in terms of disposition. Cedric and Lovita begin dating, and eventually marry and gave birth to a child. The show also featured a succession of young actresses who served as female foils to Romeo and Bullethead; the longest-lasting of these was Lori Beth Denberg as the overachieving, socially inept Lydia Gutman. Rapper The Lady of Rage also had a recurring role as Coretta "The Ox" Cox, a physically massive, brutish teenage girl in romantic pursuit of Romeo. Coretta would call Bullethead a "broke Brad Pitt" whenever he annoyed her, but would usually refer to Lydia as "Linda", "Lisa", or "Lucy" (correctly calling her "Lydia" only once).

Steve was part of a fictional music group called "Steve Hightower and the High Tops," who would temporarily reunite to perform on occasion. The members consisted of Steve, T-Bone (played by T. K. Carter, later by Don 'D.C.' Curry), Pretty Tony (played by Ronald Isley of the Isley Brothers), and Clyde (played by Jonathan Slocumb). Two of their signature songs (performed several times on the show) were "When the Funk Hits the Fan" (and later on Harvey's eponymous talk show), and "Break Me Off a Piece of That Funk." Though Cedric was not an original member of the group, he usually sang with them on several events.

Minor recurring characters throughout the series included Cedric's grandmother named "Grandma Puddin'" (played by Cedric the Entertainer) and Regina's boyfriend, former NFL star Warrington Steele (played by Dorien Wilson). Kenan Thompson and Kel Mitchell appeared in several episodes as "Junior" and "Vincent" (which Nickelodeon's All That cast member Lori Beth Denberg starred in). Wayne Wilderson played Byron, a "bougie" type character who was a television producer and a member of the Onyx Club (a professional men's group that Steve and Cedric tried to join). Dwayne Adway played Jordan Maddox, a professional basketball player who was briefly married to Regina before dying during their honeymoon. Ernest Lee Thomas made a few appearances as the Reverend who eulogized Maddox, and who married Cedric and Lovita.

== Episodes ==
Season	Episodes	Originally released	
Season	Episodes	First released	Last released
1	21	August 25, 1996	May 18, 1997
2	22	September 10, 1997	May 13, 1998
3	22	September 17, 1998	May 20, 1999
4	22	September 24, 1999	May 19, 2000
5	22	October 8, 2000	May 20, 2001
6	13	October 14, 2001	February 17, 2002

== Cast ==
=== Main ===
- Steve Harvey as Steven "Steve" Hightower (Also colloquially known in the show as "Big Daddy.")
- Cedric the Entertainer as Cedric Jackie Robinson
- Merlin Santana as Romeo Miguel Jesus Pele Santana
- William Lee Scott as Stanley "Bullethead" Kuznocki
- Wendy Raquel Robinson as Principal Regina "Piggy" Grier-Maddox
- Tracy Vilar as Sophia Ortiz (season 1)
- Netfa Perry as Sara (season 1)
- Terri J. Vaughn as Lovita Alizay Jenkins-Robinson (seasons 2–6)
- Ariyan A. Johnson as Aisha (season 2)
- Lori Beth Denberg as Lydia Liza Guttman (seasons 4–6; recurring season 3)

=== Recurring ===
- Kel Mitchell as Vincent (1996–1998)
- Kenan Thompson as Junior (1996–1998)
- T. K. Carter as T-Bone (1996–1998)
  - Don "D.C." Curry as T-Bone (2001)
- Ronald Isley as Pretty Tony (1996–2001)
- Jonathan Slocumb as Clyde (1996–2001)
- The Lady of Rage as Coretta "The Ox" Cox (1997–2000; credited during season 4 episodes as "Robin Yvette")
- Wayne Wilderson as Byron (1998–2001)
- Dorien Wilson as Warrington Steele (1997–1998)
- Samm Levine as Arthur Rabinowitz (2001)
- Dwayne Adway as Jordan Maddox (2000)

=== Special guest appearances ===
- Marissa Jaret Winokur
- Teena Marie
- Meagan Good
- Jerry Springer
- Bow Wow
- Jermaine Dupri
- Teddy Riley
- Snoop Dogg
- Sean Combs
- Kim Fields
- Isabel Sanford
- Judge Greg Mathis
- Antonio Fargas
- Busta Rhymes
- Brian McKnight
- Nikki Cox
- Boris Kodjoe
- Gabrielle Union
- Bumper Robinson
- Adrian Zmed
- Jennifer Lyons
- Ja'net Dubois
- Megalyn Echikunwoke
- Dawnn Lewis

== Seasonal ratings in the United States ==
Season	Network	Season premiere	Season finale	Rank	Viewers (in millions)
1	The WB	August 25, 1996	May 18, 1997	#147	2.7 household rating
2	The WB	September 10, 1997	May 13, 1998	#144	3.4 household rating
3	The WB	September 18, 1998	May 20, 1999	#125	4.1
4	The WB	September 24, 1999	May 19, 2000	#146	2.2
5	The WB	October 8, 2000	May 20, 2001	#138	2.1
6	The WB	October 14, 2001	February 17, 2002	#141	3.0

== Series end ==
In 2001, Harvey decided to pursue other projects. He wished to end the show after the fifth season, but at the insistence of the WB network, filmed a 13-episode sixth season.

The series ended with Regina mulling over a job offer to be a principal at a private school in California. Steve, who refused to go with Regina, acts supportive despite his feelings. Regina ends up taking the job; with encouragement from Lydia, Bullethead, and Romeo, Steve decides to go after her to reveal his true feelings. Lydia, Romeo, and Bullethead have all graduated by the series finale. Meanwhile, Cedric and Lovita win the lottery and Lovita goes into labor (Terri J. Vaughn's real-life pregnancy was written into the show that season).

== Syndication ==
The series was first distributed to syndication to The WB, Fox, UPN, and independent affiliates in the United States by Columbia TriStar Television Distribution in September 2001, and remained airing in broadcast syndication in some American markets on various local stations (such as WCIU and MeTV in Chicago) as late as 2008. From 2001 to 2005, reruns aired on NYC-based UPN station, WWOR-TV. From 2014 to June 2016, after Bill Cosby's sexual harassment allegations, The Cosby Show reruns were replaced on The WB's New York flagship station, WPIX by reruns of The Steve Harvey Show. The show began airing again in syndication as of 2015.

The series aired on BET until March 2009, also on Centric (now BET Her) until 2018 and was on TBS in the United States until September 24, 2011, and aired on the UK channel Trouble. It was broadcast on Ion Television until March 16, 2009.

From 2019 to 2021, reruns of the show were seen on getTV and as of 2023, it currently airs on Aspire TV. On December 1, 2025, the show would debut on Cozi TV.

As of 2022, the series was available for streaming online on Pluto TV and Tubi along with Amazon Prime Video in the United States and the CTV Television Network's streaming service, CTV Throwback in Canada.

In 2022, Sony Pictures' channel Throw Back TV on YouTube posted several clips and episodes from the series for streaming purposes, led to the show's distributor Sony Pictures Television launched the channel dedicated to the series on August 24, 2022.

In November 2023, all six seasons of the series were made available for streaming online on Hulu.

== Home media ==
In 2003, Columbia TriStar Home Entertainment released The Best of the Steve Harvey Show, Vol. 1, on Region 1 DVD. The disc features five episodes of the series.

== Awards and nominations ==
Year	Award	Result	Category	Recipient
1996	NCLR Bravo Awards	Nominated	Outstanding Individual Performance in a Comedy Series	Tracy Vilar
1996	NCLR Bravo Awards	Nominated	Outstanding Individual Performance in a Comedy Series	Merlin Santana
1998	ALMA Award	Nominated	Outstanding Comedy Series	-
1998	ALMA Award	Nominated	Outstanding Actress in a Comedy Series	Tracy Vilar
1998	ALMA Award	Nominated	Outstanding Actor in a Comedy Series	Merlin Santana
1999	ALMA Award	Nominated	Outstanding Actor in a Comedy Series	Merlin Santana
1998	NAACP Image Awards	Nominated	Outstanding Lead Actor in a Comedy Series	Steve Harvey
1998	NAACP Image Awards	Nominated	Outstanding Comedy Series	-
1999	NAACP Image Awards	Nominated	Outstanding Comedy Series	-
1999	NAACP Image Awards	Won	Outstanding Supporting Actor in a Comedy Series	Cedric the Entertainer
1999	NAACP Image Awards	Won	Outstanding Lead Actor in a Comedy Series	Steve Harvey
2000	NAACP Image Awards	Nominated	Outstanding Supporting Actress in a Comedy Series	Terri J. Vaughn
2000	NAACP Image Awards	Nominated	Outstanding Supporting Actress in a Comedy Series	Wendy Raquel Robinson
2000	NAACP Image Awards	Won	Outstanding Supporting Actor in a Comedy Series	Cedric the Entertainer
2000	NAACP Image Awards	Won	Outstanding Comedy Series	-
2000	NAACP Image Awards	Won	Outstanding Actor in a Comedy Series	Steve Harvey
2001	NAACP Image Awards	Nominated	Outstanding Supporting Actor in a Comedy Series	William Lee Scott
2001	NAACP Image Awards	Nominated	Outstanding Supporting Actor in a Comedy Series	Merlin Santana
2001	NAACP Image Awards	Nominated	Outstanding Actress in a Comedy Series	Wendy Raquel Robinson
2001	NAACP Image Awards	Won	Outstanding Supporting Actress in a Comedy Series	Terri J. Vaughn
2001	NAACP Image Awards	Won	Outstanding Supporting Actor in a Comedy Series	Cedric the Entertainer
2001	NAACP Image Awards	Won	Outstanding Comedy Series	-
2001	NAACP Image Awards	Won	Outstanding Actor in a Comedy Series	Steve Harvey
2002	NAACP Image Awards	Nominated	Outstanding Supporting Actor in a Comedy Series	Merlin Santana
2002	NAACP Image Awards	Nominated	Outstanding Actress in a Comedy Series	Wendy Raquel Robinson
2002	NAACP Image Awards	Won	Outstanding Supporting Actress in a Comedy Series	Terri J. Vaughn
2002	NAACP Image Awards	Won	Outstanding Supporting Actor in a Comedy Series	Cedric the Entertainer
2002	NAACP Image Awards	Won	Outstanding Comedy Series	-
2002	NAACP Image Awards	Won	Outstanding Actor in a Comedy Series	Steve Harvey
2003	NAACP Image Awards	Won	Outstanding Supporting Actress in a Comedy Series	Terri J. Vaughn

== See also ==
- Steve Harvey
- List of The Steve Harvey Show episodes
- List of Award Nominations received by The Steve Harvey Show
- The Steve Harvey Morning Show
