= List of The Steve Harvey Show episodes =

The following is an episode list for the American sitcom The Steve Harvey Show. The series ran on The WB from August 25, 1996, to February 17, 2002, with a total of 122 episodes produced, spanning six seasons.

== Series overview ==
Season	Episodes	Originally released	
Season	Episodes	First released	Last released
1	21	August 25, 1996	May 18, 1997
2	22	September 10, 1997	May 13, 1998
3	22	September 17, 1998	May 20, 1999
4	22	September 24, 1999	May 19, 2000
5	22	October 8, 2000	May 20, 2001
6	13	October 14, 2001	February 17, 2002

== Episodes ==
=== Season 1 (1996–97) ===
No. overall	No. in season	Title	Directed by	Written by	Original release date	Prod. code	Viewers (millions)
1	1	"Back to School"	Stan Lathan	Winifred Hervey	August 25, 1996	101	4.7
A very successful musician Steve Hightower who had a successful music group and becomes an inner-city music teacher, and soon discovers someone from his past is also at the school.
2	2	"Dead Dog Walking"	Stan Lathan	Walter Allen Bennett	September 15, 1996	102	4.2
Bullethead is at the end of his rope when his dog gets impounded and he doesn't have the cash to bail him out. Meanwhile, Cedric gets the boot from his mama's apartment and looks to Steve for a place to live.
3	3	"Mr. Hightower's Opus"	Stan Lathan	Manny Basanese	September 22, 1996	103	4.6
As he and Cedric struggle to work out their differences as roommates, Steve bets Regina he can put together a school band in fewer than five days.
4	4	"The Rock"	Stan Lathan	Michael Rowe	September 29, 1996	104	4.2
Rumors of an on-going affair sweep the school when Sara and Romeo are caught hiding in a closet while trying to avoid Principal Grier. Meanwhile, Cedric goes way overboard vying for "Teacher of the Month" honors.
5	5	"Brush with Greatness"	Stan Lathan	Lawrence Holmes	October 6, 1996	105	4.5
Romeo paints himself into a corner by falsely taking credit for the winning entry in a poster contest, for artwork that was actually done by Sophia. Meanwhile, Cedric receives a platinum card and goes on a spending spree and is happy... until he gets his bill.
6	6	"Loose Lips Sink Friendships"	Stan Lathan	B. Mark Seabrooks	October 13, 1996	106	4.3
The homecoming dance is approaching, and no one, including chaperone Steve, is happy with their dates. Romeo and Bullethead turn to Steve for help with the homecoming dance, while Cedric joins a video-dating service.
7	7	"Papa Don't Take No Mess"	Stan Lathan	Manny Basanese & Walter Allen Bennett & Winifred Hervey	October 27, 1996	107	4.2
Romeo's old-school father enrolls him in vocational-training classes, much to Romeo's dislike. Meanwhile, Steve and Cedric try to catch a mouse running loose in their apartment.
8	8	"The Play's Not the Thing"	Stan Lathan	Manny Basanese & Walter Allen Bennett & Lawrence Holmes	November 3, 1996	108	4.0
Sophia wins the role of Juliet in the school's production of "Romeo and Juliet," but Romeo is not chosen to play opposite her as his own namesake. Now Romeo must deal with watching another man play Romeo to Sophia's Juliet.
9	9	"Big Brothers"	Stan Lathan	Walter Allen Bennett	November 10, 1996	109	4.1
Cedric volunteers to be a "big brother" to a fatherless teenage boy and tries to get Steve involved in the organization. Note: This is the first episode in which the Steve Harvey Show logo is shown for an opening scene.
10	10	"High Top Reunion"	Stan Lathan	Manny Basanese	November 17, 1996	110	4.4
Steve reunites with his old singing group, "The Hi-Tops," to perform on an awards show. But when a band member gets injured, Cedric is the only available substitute.
11	11	"That's My Mama"	Stan Lathan	B. Mark Seabrooks	November 24, 1996	111	4.8
Steve gets Regina to help trick his visiting mother into believing that they are a couple. Meanwhile, Romeo makes two dates for the same night & decides to see them both at the same restaurant at the same time.
12	12	"Pool Sharks Git Bit"	Stan Lathan	Lawrence Holmes	December 15, 1996	112	4.0
Bullethead and Romeo hope to pocket some cash hustling pool, but the tables are turned on them and they wind up holding the short end of the stick.
13	13	"Coming to Chicago"	Stan Lathan	Manny Basanese & B. Mark Seabrooks	January 12, 1997	113	4.59
When Steve scores hard-to-get tickets to a concert, Regina agrees to go out with him. Meanwhile, Sara reluctantly agrees to go out on a date with Bullethead.
14	14	"African-American Me"	Stan Lathan	James Hannah	February 2, 1997	114	4.26
On his way to play the piano at Regina's church, Steve gets arrested and thrown in jail with Cedric.
15	15	"When the Funk Bites the Dust"	Stan Lathan	Jeffrey Duteil	February 9, 1997	115	3.97
The Hi-Tops' ex-manager gets engaged and the group gathers for a bachelor party at Steve's apartment and Angela takes a compatibility test from a magazine, and the results show that her and Steve are not compatible. In revenge, Steve creates a test that intentionally shows that Regina is not the woman for him. Meanwhile, the students are assigned the task of creating a short film for a contest and Don volunteers to perform a ventriloquism act for Booker T's annual high school talent show, but he discovers that it's harder than it looks.
16	16	"Big Daddy's Baby Girl"	Stan Lathan	Lawrence Holmes	February 16, 1997	116	4.77
A 19-year-old woman steals into Steve's life claiming to be his daughter, the outcome of a long-ago romantic liaison. Meanwhile, Bullethead is suddenly popular when everyone learns that he has a pair of floor seat tickets to a Chicago Bulls game.
17	17	"I Do, I Don't"	Stan Lathan	James Hannah	February 23, 1997	120	5.60
Snoop Doggy Dogg and Sean "Puffy" Combs visit the school to talk to Steve's class about the rumored rivlary between East and West Coast rappers.
18	18	"Guess Who's Not Coming to Dinner?"	Stan Lathan	Walter Allen Bennett & B. Mark Seabrooks	April 27, 1997	118	3.48
Since Regina's sorority sister is visiting from out of town, Regina decides to impress her by lying about having a wealthy handsome boyfriend, and enlists Steve to help her out with her deceit. Guest stars: Jerry Springer as himself
19	19	"The Roof Is on Fire"	Stan Lathan	Mike Costa	May 4, 1997	119	3.39
Steve tries to put some "sparks" into Regina's dull party -- and proceeds to set the roof on fire. Then, he offers to let her stay at his place.
20	20	"Love with Interest"	Stan Lathan	B. Mark Seabrooks	May 11, 1997	117	3.15
A smooth-talking bank officer shows an interest in Regina and for Mother's Day, Steve decides that each of the boys will build something for Angela. Mike and Don succeed in making jewelry and recipe boxes; however, the more unskilled laborer Don does not want to build anything, since he is not interested in chalkboarding. Also, Romeo and his mother tries to consult Sara, Bullethead and Sophia parrot-nap a rival school's mascot about what to do with Don.
21	21	"Can't Buy Me Love"	Stan Lathan	Walter Allen Bennett	May 18, 1997	121	3.21
Steve gives a birthday gift to Regina on her birthday, to show her he cares. But Regina also gets a gift from another admirer, an expensive gift, and believes the expensive gift is from Steve.

=== Season 2 (1997–98) ===
No. overall	No. in season	Title	Directed by	Written by	Original release date	Prod. code	Viewers (millions)
22	1	"Whatever You Want"	Stan Lathan	Winifred Hervey	September 10, 1997	201	3.92
Cedric falls in love with Regina's new 'round-the-way' secretary Lovita Alizé Jenkins (Terri J. Vaughn) after Sara and Sophia left to go to college. As Steve's insensitivity upsets Regina, Sara and Sophia's departure turns into a disaster and Romeo and Bullethead square off over a new beautiful classmate. Romeo weighs his feelings for his once-heavy platonic friend Aisha who spent her summer at a weight-loss farm and now is lovely, fit and sexy.
23	2	"Somebody's Sleepin' in My Bed"	Stan Lathan	B. Mark Seabrooks	September 17, 1997	202	4.99
Steve and Cedric argue over Lovita making herself too much at home in the apartment, so Ced storms out and spends the night at Regina's. Guest stars: Jonathan Palmer as Timothy Jordan and Scottie Pippen as himself
24	3	"Bully Call"	Stan Lathan	Walter Allen Bennett, Jr.	September 24, 1997	203	5.14
School tough Coretta "The Ox" Cox takes a liking to Romeo and scares off his regular honeys.
25	4	"Don't Quit Your Day Job"	Stan Lathan	Manny Basanese	October 1, 1997	204	5.28
Steve convinces Romeo to join the predominantly female choir and discovers that he can't sing a note.
26	5	"Fool and the Gang"	Stan Lathan	Lawrence T. Holmes	October 8, 1997	205	4.74
For a fund-raiser, Steve tries to reunite the Hi-Tops, but learns they've formed a new band without him. So he decides to make some beautiful new music with Regina. Meanwhile, Bullethead decides to quit school to work full time at his new job in the mall.
27	6	"Let's Talk About Sax"	Stan Lathan	Story by : Rob Kurtz & Eric Brand; Teleplay by : Jill Soloway	October 15, 1997	206	5.25
Steve's audition with Teddy Riley hits a sour note when his saxophone is pawned by Romeo, who uses the money to buy a suit.
28	7	"When the Funk Hits the Rib Tips"	Stan Lathan	Manny Basanese	October 29, 1997	208	5.06
It's Halloween, and Steve, as usual is up to his old tricks and puts together a band and auditions at a local club, where the competition is his former group, the Hi-Tops, formed their own group.
29	8	"Steve's Gotta Have It"	Stan Lathan	Jeffrey Duteil	November 5, 1997	207	4.86
Steve blows off a banquet with the teenager he's mentoring so that he can prepare a romantic meal for Regina. Meanwhile, Romeo gets a hand from his classmates after injuring his arm in a skateboard accident. Later, they found out that Romeo faked his injury the whole time.
30	9	"I'm Not a Chauvinist, Piggy"	Stan Lathan	Jeffrey Duteil	November 12, 1997	209	5.44
Steve thinks his manhood is in question after Regina, a.k.a. "Xena, the Warrior Principal," beats the stuffing out of a too-fresh chicken mascot at a basketball game. Also, Romeo and Bullethead enroll in a dance class.
31	10	"Big Daddy Meets the Man of Steele"	Stan Lathan	Walter Allen Bennett, Jr.	November 19, 1997	210	5.59
Steve has competition for Regina's affections when her college beau comes back to town to take a job as a sportscaster and to renew their relationship. Also Bullethead meets a new transfer student name Kim Jennifer Lyons, who got a big backside.
32	11	"Shut Up and Kiss Me"	Stan Lathan	Lawrence T. Holmes	December 10, 1997	211	5.51
With Regina dating a new guy, Steve tries to get something cooking with a caterer who's working for his party. Regina won't be able to attend because she's celebrating her birthday with wealthy, boyfriend Warrington Steele. Bullhead and Romeo sign up their rap act for the school's talent contest. Cedric tries to avoid wearing a sweatshirt bearing Lovita's picture.
33	12	"You're Driving Me Crazy"	Stan Lathan	James Hannah	January 7, 1998	212	5.04
Warrington buys Regina a luxury car in honour of their first month together, and then gets upset when she doesn't drive it.
34	13	"Dancing Fools"	Stan Lathan	B. Mark Seabrooks	January 21, 1998	213	5.39
Regina drives her partner Cedric hard, in her quest to win the school's dance contest.
35	14	"Breakfast with Tiffany"	Stan Lathan	Winifred Hervey	January 28, 1998	214	5.24
Steve agrees to date Regina's recently dumped, vulnerable friend. Lovita helps Ced with his taxes, and discovers receipts that show he has gone out with other women. And Romeo teaches his "Mack-a-nomics" class to teach the guys about how to get over on women.
36	15	"Papa's Got a Brand New Bag"	Stan Lathan	Lisa Rosenthal	February 4, 1998	215	5.3
Steve's father shows up with his young fiancee, and Steve thinks she's trying to kill the old man for a half-million dollar insurance policy.
37	16	"Just My Imagination"	Stan Lathan	Manny Basanese	February 11, 1998	216	5.09
Steve and Romeo both make a play for an attractive playwright whose latest work is being staged at the school.
38	17	"Maid to Order"	Stan Lathan	James Hannah	February 18, 1998	217	4.35
Steve and Cedric think their housekeeping prayers are answered when they hire an elderly cleaning lady from Lovita's church.
39	18	"Ice Station Piggy"	Stan Lathan	Winifred Hervey & Jeffrey Duteil	February 25, 1998	218	4.55
On their way to a conference, Steve and Regina get stuck in a snowstorm while traveling the back roads. Meanwhile, Lovita's country cousin puts the moves on Ced.
40	19	"White Men Can Funk"	Stan Lathan	Kenneth Braun & Josslyn Luckett	March 4, 1998	219	6.41
When Deidre can't quit her job for a week, she asks Cedric to fill in so Steve and two of his former singing partners must find a fourth voice before their group performs at an oldies show. Meanwhile, the students get a lesson in parenting and asks Steve to be their assistant. Steve has a hard time not being the center of attention, but when Angela and Regina shows him that he can assist her, he decides to help Cedric. Don finds it hard to talk to a girl in Steve's classroom named Evangeline (Angell Conwell).
41	20	"The He-Man, Player-Hater's Club"	Stan Lathan	B. Mark Seabrooks	April 29, 1998	221	5.64
Steve and Cedric are up for membership in a men's club, where they'll be "rubbing elbows with Chicago's business elite". Romeo and Bullethead use a new camera to meet girls.
42	21	"That's a Bunch of Bull, Ced"	Stan Lathan	Lawrence T. Holmes	May 6, 1998	222	4.45
Lovita is upset when Cedric wins a pair of tickets to a Chicago Bulls playoff game and decides to take Steve. Regina is upset when a shipment of cafeteria food is not delivered.
43	22	"Ring Around the Piggy"	Stan Lathan	Walter Allen Bennett, Jr.	May 13, 1998	220	5.10
Rumors of a big announcement from Warrington has everyone thinking he's going to propose to Regina. Romeo and Bullethead send a strict teacher anonymous love letters hoping to help their grades.

=== Season 3 (1998–99) ===
No. overall	No. in season	Title	Directed by	Written by	Original release date	Prod. code	Viewers (millions)
44	1	"Das Bootie"	Stan Lathan	Ben Montanio & Vince Cheung	September 17, 1998	302	3.33
Steve and Regina go on a cruise where he hopes to "define" his unconsummated relationship with Regina.
45	2	"Baby You Can Drive My Car"	Stan Lathan	B. Mark Seabrooks	September 24, 1998	301	3.18
Bullethead and Romeo get the OK to take driver's education which is now being taught by Steve.
46	3	"Educating Piggy"	Stan Lathan	Manny Basanese	October 1, 1998	304	4.29
Steve, Cedric and Regina attend a mandatory computer course being taught by Lovita. Meanwhile, Romeo decides to run for class president.
47	4	"Welcome to Bernie's"	Stan Lathan	Winifred Hervey	October 8, 1998	305	4.55
Steve, Cedric, Lovita and Regina attend a seminar on faculty relationships. Meanwhile, Romeo becomes jealous of all the attention that Bullethead is getting with his wooden puppet.
48	5	"And Injustice for All"	Stan Lathan	Walter Allen Bennett, Jr.	October 15, 1998	303	4.15
When the television set Steve sold Lovita goes on a fritz, she sues him and they go before a judge he once courted -- and dumped. Regina gets an autograph Michael Jordan basketball, which Cedric wants to use to inspire his losing basketball team, much to Regina's dismay.
49	6	"What You Won't Cue for Love"	Stan Lathan	Lawrence T. Holmes	October 29, 1998	306	4.03
Lovita and Regina take on Steve and Cedric in a pool tournament, and Romeo and Bullethead fake a Bubble-boy to win concert tickets.
50	7	"Everybody Loves Regina"	Stan Lathan	Ben Montanio & Vince Cheung	November 5, 1998	308	4.29
Junior and Vincent, the two kids that Steve and Cedric mentored as "big brothers", return, and Junior asks Regina if she would go out on a date with his older brother. Steve dates a young coffee shop waitress.
51	8	"Rent"	Stan Lathan	B. Mark Seabrooks	November 12, 1998	307	4.06
Steve's girlfriend, who works for the IRS, learns that Cedric is committing tax fraud.
52	9	"Every Boy Needs a Teacher"	Stan Lathan	Manny Basanese	November 19, 1998	309	3.51
Regina agrees to date the "man-boy" who services the office water cooler.
53	10	"Uncle Steve"	Stan Lathan	Kenneth Braun & James Hannah	December 3, 1998	312	4.17
Lovita and Regina give a makeover to Steve's wallflower of a niece, who blossoms into a looker who gets more than a second look from Romeo, Mr. Williams, Steve's high school shop teacher, comes to visit, but gets angry and leaves after Steve telling Mr. Williams what he can and can't do at Booker T's.
54	11	"The Snow Job"	Stan Lathan	Kenneth Braun	December 17, 1998	311	4.49
A blizzard ruins Steve's, Regina's, Cedric's and Lovita's plans for the weekend. Lydia, Romeo, and Bullethead get trapped in Steve's classroom trying to retrieve what's most precious to them.
55	12	"Strapped Tease"	Stan Lathan	Lawrence T. Holmes	January 7, 1999	314	4.83
Steve and Cedric plan to hire strippers for their friend's bachelor party. But when the strippers show up, the guys get a little more than they bargained for.
56	13	"Lovita Doesn't Live Here Anymore"	Stan Lathan	Winifred Hervey	January 14, 1999	310	4.75
After a fight with her Mama, Lovita moves in with Cedric. But when Regina sympathizes, Lovita moves in with her.
57	14	"Working Homegirl"	Stan Lathan	Leslie Ray	January 21, 1999	313	4.04
To impress her visiting great-aunt, Lovita tells a few lies where she makes her great-aunt believe that she and Cedric are married, she's the principal and Steve runs errands for the newlyweds.
58	15	"Nightmare on Steve's Street"	Stan Lathan	Andrea Allen	February 4, 1999	315	4.29
Cedric believes there's a spirit haunting the apartment, so he talks Steve, Lovita and Regina into having a seance. Meanwhile, after Bullethead saves Coretta's life, she returns the favor by protecting him from bullies.
59	16	"All That Jazz"	Stan Lathan	James Hannah	February 11, 1999	321	4.15
Steve has trouble composing a song for a Black History month assembly, until some unknown "musical genius" finishes it for him. Meanwhile, Romeo and Bullethead meet beautiful tenants Amber and Monique in Regina's apartment, and pretend it is their apartment.
60	17	"Big Mouth on Campus"	Stan Lathan	Ben Montanio & Vince Cheung	February 18, 1999	316	3.7
Cedric lets being named "Teacher of the Year" go to his head, angering fellow teachers, students and even Lovita.
61	18	"Liar, Liar, Your Versace's on Fire"	Stan Lathan	Walter Allen Bennett, Jr.	February 25, 1999	317	4.27
Cedric and Steve test out a "lie buster," but the device backfires for Cedric when Lovita catches him in a string of white lies. Meanwhile, Lydia gets her own TV show and asks Bullethead and Romeo to help. Also, Regina gets competitive with her new beau.
62	19	"Almost Dirty Dancing"	Stan Lathan	Lawrence T. Holmes	April 29, 1999	318	4.20
Regina helps Steve's friend with the one thing that keeps coming between him and his wife: dancing. Meanwhile, Steve and Cedric try to compete with Romeo and Bullethead in a string of events.
63	20	"Steve Don't Get Nun"	Stan Lathan	B. Mark Seabrooks	May 6, 1999	320	3.75
Steve wants to rekindle an old flame, but his former girlfriend has some news that might change his mind.
64	21	"A Star Is Born"	Stan Lathan	Josslyn Luckett	May 13, 1999	319	4.50
Regina becomes obsessed with defeating an old high-school rival in a choir competition and finds her hope squashed when the soloist ends up with laryngitis right before the competition. She and Steve, by chance, find a new one in Lydia.
65	22	"My Left Gator"	Stan Lathan	Manny Basanese & B. Mark Seabrooks	May 20, 1999	322	3.64
A breakup leaves Steve broken, as does an injury he received while helping Regina move furniture. Meanwhile, Cedric tries to stamp out Lovita's petty jealousies.

=== Season 4 (1999–2000) ===
No. overall	No. in season	Title	Directed by	Written by	Original release date	Prod. code	Viewers (millions)
66	1	"Detention Peddler"	Stan Lathan	Walter Allen Bennett, Jr.	September 24, 1999	401	3.49
In the fourth-season opener, Steve applies for the vice-principal position at the school, much to the chagrin of Regina. Meanwhile, Cedric comes up with creative ways to propose to Lovita.
67	2	"Party of Five"	Stan Lathan	Ben Montanio & Vince Cheung	October 1, 1999	402	4.26
Cedric and Lovita decide to live together before they get married; and Regina ignores Steve's school proposal to counsel at-risk students. Meanwhile, Bullethead and Lydia share a locker, and Romeo gets a mysterious lockermate.
68	3	"He's Gotta Have It"	Stan Lathan	Josslyn Luckett	October 8, 1999	403	2.75
Steve and Regina clash when they share an office. Meanwhile, Cedric loses his sex drive after a computer program predicts that his and Lovita's child will be ugly. Romeo and his girlfriend Tessa decide to elope after getting advice from Steve.
69	4	"Little Stevie Blunder"	Stan Lathan	James Hannah	October 15, 1999	404	3.71
Steve pretends to be blind to impress a woman, and Bullethead enters the Miss Booker T. beauty pageant in the hopes of winning a new computer. Meanwhile, Lovita wants to know what's in a locked metal box she found in Cedric's closet.
70	5	"Roomies"	Stan Lathan	Kenneth Braun	October 22, 1999	405	3.19
Regina stays at Steve's apartment while her place is being fumigated, and she immediately annoys her new roommates with her bubbly and bossy disposition. Meanwhile, Lydia prepares for her belated Bat Mitzvah, and Regina wants to accompany Steve to a celebrity fund-raiser.
71	6	"Boomerang"	Stan Lathan	Ben Montanio & Vince Cheung	November 5, 1999	408	2.75
Steve acts a like fool while pursuing a woman, and his friends intervene to save his dignity. Regina warns Steve the woman stole her college boyfriend and then dumped him. Meanwhile, an electric shock gives Bullethead the power to pick winning stocks.
72	7	"My Whole Left Side"	Stan Lathan	B. Mark Seabrooks	November 12, 1999	406	3.67
While Cedric is away at a coaches conference, his grandmother stays at Steve's apartment and torments Lovita. Meanwhile, Coretta uses Romeo, Lydia and Bullethead as models to show off her own style of fashion after Steve ensures her that she has the potential to become a fashion designer.
73	8	"My Two Big Daddies"	Stan Lathan	Manny Basanese	November 19, 1999	407	3.53
Steve pretends to be a single parent to impress an attractive member of a support group --and pays Romeo to portray his son. Meanwhile, Regina conducts employee evaluations and Bullethead romances a Catholic school student.
74	9	"Y2K"	Stan Lathan	Walter Allen Bennett, Jr.	December 17, 1999	411	3.10
New Year's Eve plans go awry for both Steve and Regina, while Cedric frets over the new millennium hoopla. Meanwhile, Romeo is invited to a party under false pretenses.
75	10	"All About Steve"	Stan Lathan	David Pincus	January 7, 2000	409	3.00
Regina attends a symposium on education and leaves Steve in charge. He later realizes that supervising the entire school is a greater challenge than he expected. Meanwhile, Cedric and Lovita argue about their wedding plans.
76	11	"Going, Going, Gone"	Stan Lathan	Jeffrey Duteil	January 14, 2000	410	3.32
Regina recruits Steve and Cedric to participate in a charity bachelor auction where another woman outbids Lovita for her fiancee. Meanwhile, Romeo and Bullethead join Lydia in reading the school's morning announcements.
77	12	"Boy Trouble"	Stan Lathan	Kenneth Braun & Josslyn Luckett	January 21, 2000	413	3.38
Regina wants her new school program approved by the visiting district supervisor, who instead takes a shine to Steve's ideas. Meanwhile, Bullethead, Romeo and Lydia join the faculty-talent show committee and change the format of the event.
78	13	"Guess Who's Not Coming to Counseling"	Stan Lathan	B. Mark Seabrooks	February 4, 2000	414	3.43
Lovita enlists Steve to pose as her fiancé. Meanwhile, Romeo and Bullethead form a singing group.
79	14	"Black Streak"	Stan Lathan	James Hannah	February 11, 2000	412	3.29
Regina offers to throw Lovita's bridal shower, but her plans cause friction with Lovita's friends, who envision a much livelier party. Meanwhile, Cedric and Steve begin to feel old and decide to do something wild and crazy to break out of their rut.
80	15	"Wedlocked"	Stan Lathan	Manny Basanese & B. Mark Seabrooks	February 18, 2000	417	3.51
Retrieving a top hat for his wedding gets Cedric locked in a storage room with Steve -- just as the ceremony is about to begin.
81	16	"The Honeymooners"	Stan Lathan	Winifred Hervey	February 25, 2000	422	3.21
Steve gets tickets to Orlando, Florida and takes Regina as well as his class, but this turns into a huge conflict for Cedric.
82	17	"If Cooks Could Kill"	Stan Lathan	James Hannah	April 14, 2000	419	3.14
Steve and Cedric enter a cooking contest in hopes of winning a new television, but they face tough competition from Regina and Lovita.
83	18	"Moonlighting"	Stan Lathan	Manny Basanese	April 21, 2000	415	2.90
To earn money to pay off their wedding bills, Lovita and Cedric set up a salon in Steve's apartment, which may get them all evicted. Meanwhile, Regina fawns over a novelist who has agreed to speak to her book club.
84	19	"Don't Stand Too Close to Me"	Stan Lathan	Kenneth Braun & Josslyn Luckett	April 28, 2000	416	3.54
Romeo's girlfriend, Alicia, develops a huge crush on Steve after the music teacher speaks to the feminist group the teen belongs to. Meanwhile, Regina feels left out when Cedric and Lovita begin socializing with another couple who are hiding a secret life.
85	20	"African-American Gigolo"	Stan Lathan	Walter Allen Bennett, Jr., & Vince Cheung & Ben Montanio	May 5, 2000	418	2.47
Regina sets Steve up with his dream date, while Steve finds a man for Regina who's not what he appears to be. Meanwhile, Cedric follows a bizarre pregame ritual to keep his basketball team's winning streak alive.
86	21	"I Believe I Can Lie"	Stan Lathan	Story by : Winifred Hervey & Andrea Allen; Teleplay by : Winifred Hervey	May 12, 2000	420	2.35
Steve arranges for a celebrity to speak at the school's Entrepreneur Day, and when he learns that the guest can't make it, he's reluctant to tell everyone. Elsewhere, Cedric and Lovita discover an extra $8,000 in their bank account.
87	22	"Dressed to Chill"	Stan Lathan	Vince Cheung & Ben Montanio	May 19, 2000	421	3.33
Booker T. Washington is chosen for instituting a uniform policy and Lydia is in charge. Meanwhile, Bullethead and Romeo are inspired by Steve's story to boycott these uniforms.

=== Season 5 (2000–01) ===
No. overall	No. in season	Title	Directed by	Written by	Original release date	Prod. code	Viewers (millions)
88	1	"When the Funk Hits the Big 4-0"	Stan Lathan	B. Mark Seabrooks	October 8, 2000	501	3.68
The fifth-season opener marks Steve's impending 40th birthday as he laments getting older without achieving many of his goals, including a motorcycle tour of the country. Meanwhile, during the summer vacation, Regina meets and begins dating a professional basketball player on a trip to the islands, and the relationship may lead to something even deeper. Lovita discovers that all the queasiness she's been experiencing might be because she is pregnant.
89	2	"Player, Interrupted"	Stan Lathan	Vince Cheung & Ben Montanio	October 15, 2000	502	3.25
Regina recruits Steve and Cedric to help impress her fiance's friends at a charity event in a mental hospital, which they soon become patients of; Bullethead and Romeo join Lydia's club.
90	3	"My Best Piggy's Wedding"	Stan Lathan	Josslyn Luckett	October 22, 2000	503	3.87
Steve, depressed and feeling jilted over Regina's impending nuptials, kicks his effort to get her back into high gear when he hears of their accelerated plans to elope. Meanwhile, Lovita tells Cedric to flirt with the female landlord of an apartment they want; and Lydia discovers that she was adopted.
91	4	"Love, Death and Basketball"	Stan Lathan	Manny Basanese	October 29, 2000	504	3.26
Steve takes over as principal when Regina leaves town for her wedding, but she returns early from her honeymoon with tragic news. Elsewhere, Lydia nags Romeo and Bullethead about letting her join them during senior skip day.
92	5	"Touched by a Pig"	Stan Lathan	James Hannah	November 5, 2000	505	3.31
Steve tries to be a good friend and lets Regina stay with him in her time of need. Meanwhile, Cedric's visiting Grandma Puddin' makes some soul food out of the cherished possession Regina's husband left her in his will. Romeo, Bullethead and Lydia steal Steve's briefcase and hold it for ransom after the teacher refuses to chaperone a class trip to an amusement park.
93	6	"African-American Pie"	Stan Lathan	Kenneth Braun	November 12, 2000	506	3.70
Steve handles the arrangements for the school's annual Teachers Appreciation Day assembly, angering Cedric, who usually plans the event. The acting principal then suffers from the stress of organizing the occasion and dating a younger woman.
94	7	"A Star Is Born Again"	Stan Lathan	Lawrence T. Holmes	November 19, 2000	507	3.08
Steve manages an all-girl singing group called Jail-Bait, and books a gig for them that he hopes will revive his own show-business career. His plans may be dashed when Regina's advice to the girls causes them to question their act.
95	8	"This Little Piggy Went Home"	Stan Lathan	Jeffrey Duteil	November 26, 2000	508	3.59
Regina and Steve get very chummy during a game of Pictionary that also starts a fight between Cedric and Lovita. Elsewhere, Lydia takes offense to an assignment Steve gives his music class that requires them to report on their family histories.
96	9	"Analyze Dis"	Stan Lathan	Josslyn Luckett	December 17, 2000	510	3.28
Steve has a hard time relinquishing his duties as acting principal when Regina returns to school, creating tension between them. Meanwhile, Cedric's in the doghouse after Lovita discovers he has a private savings account.
97	10	"Tiger Hoods"	Stan Lathan	Vince Cheung & Ben Montanio	January 7, 2001	509	2.84
Steve conspires with his friends and students to attend a celebrity golf tournament and appear to be in school at the same time after Regina refuses to let him take the day off. Meanwhile, Ced tries to pitch another one of his get-rich-quick schemes, which he calls "Bro" Balls, (black golf balls) to the contestants at the golf tournament.
98	11	"Big Daddy Daddy"	Stan Lathan	B. Mark Seabrooks	January 14, 2001	511	3.07
Romeo moves in with Steve after the teen's family departs for New York and the boy stays behind to finish the school year at Booker T. Meanwhile, a misunderstanding causes Regina to invite herself on a ski weekend that Cedric and Lovita had planned to take alone.
99	12	"Me, Me and Miss Jones"	Stan Lathan	Kenneth Braun	January 21, 2001	512	2.93
Steve finds romance with a 25-year-old swimsuit model, but is shocked when he finds out that Romeo is trying to woo the same woman.
100	13	"No Free Samples"	Stan Lathan	Manny Basanese	February 4, 2001	513	4.20
The sitcom celebrates its 100th episode with this musically themed installment, which includes performances by R&B singer Ron Isley and rapper Lil' Bow Wow.
101	14	"House Party"	Stan Lathan	Vince Cheung & Ben Montanio	February 11, 2001	516	3.21
"When a storm leaves their apartment flooded", Cedric and Lovita need a new venue for their party; Cedric states that the apartment flooded due to them using spurs on the waterbed.
102	15	"Mother and Child Reunion"	Stan Lathan	James Hannah	February 18, 2001	514	2.96
Romeo's mother visits from New York with news that she plans to leave her husband and start a new life in Chicago. Meanwhile, Regina hints that she wants her friends to throw her a party to celebrate her 10th anniversary as Booker T's principal.
103	16	"Not the Best Man"	Stan Lathan	Jeffrey Duteil	February 25, 2001	517	3.29
Regina learns that she is not going to be a maid-of-honor at a friend's wedding after she thought she was a shoo-in. Meanwhile, after a critic declares performance artist Romeo out of touch with reality, the Hightowers' neighbor and student decides to be more like others so Steve tells his music class to write a new version of the school song for an assembly the mayor is attending and Steve and Cedric compete in a cooking contest.
104	17	"After the Fall"	Stan Lathan	Josslyn Luckett	April 1, 2001	522	2.86
Clips from past episodes are featured as a television producer interviews Steve's friends for a documentary about the former singer. Steve's friend Byron, a television producer, decides to make Steve the subject of a documentary identifying a celebrity whose fifteen minutes of fame has expired. Cedric, Lovita and Regina seize the opportunity to be interviewed for the program and warm to the chance to see themselves on television. But when questioned, Regina won't divulge any information about her personal relationship with Steve and neither Cedic nor Lovita have a bad word to say about him. As the interviews progress, Byron realizes the scandalous stories about Steve might have to come from the students. Unfortunately, Romeo, Bullethead and Lydia don't have anything but positive anecdotes about Steve. Byron then questions Steve, hoping he might reveal a few skeletons in the closet, but Steve, instead, tells him that he's had a happy life educating and serving as a role model for his students. When Byron presses him further, Steve throws him out. The day the documentary airs, Steve, Cedric, Lovita, Regina and Byron gather around the television. Before Byron can explain, they are stunned to find the hour-long documentary has been reduced to a single short segment. Byron says Steve's straight and narrow lifestyle made for bad television. But when the gang rallies behind Steve, he realizes how important he is to the people around him and his true value is only just being realized.
105	18	"The Negotiator"	Stan Lathan	Kenneth Braun	April 22, 2001	521	2.71
The annual faculty-student talent show brings out the worst in Steve, Regina and Cedric. With the approach of the annual student-faculty talent show, Steve and Cedric are determined to find partners to help them to beat the defending champion, Regina. Though she feigns a lack of interest in the contest and its prize, Regina secretly scours the student body for someone who will help her win again. And upon learning Bullethead is performing with Cedric, and Romeo has been chosen for Regina's tap dancing act, Steve partners with Lydia. Meanwhile, Lovita complains about not being allowed to enter the talent show, too. Upon arriving for their first rehearsal, Romeo finds Regina just wants him for his looks and not his dancing skills. When Lydia wants to perform a duet made popular by Barbra Streisand and Neil Diamond, Steve balks. When Cedric insults Bullethead at their first rehearsal, the students complain about how badly they are being treated and decide to go on strike. And after making her exclusion from the talent show Cedric's problem, too, Lovita blames the faculty for letting their own ambitions drive their student partners away. In the wake of Lovita's reprimand, Steve, Regina and Cedric apologize to the students. With Lovita acting as mediator, the kids agree to return to the show once they are allowed to perform, too. Finally, Cedric joins Bullethead for their magic act. But despite the stiff competition provided by Steve and Lydia's rendition of "You Don't Bring Me Flowers," as well as Regina and Romeo's tap duet, the trophy goes to another student-teacher duo.
106	19	"Here Comes the Judge"	Stan Lathan	B. Mark Seabrooks	April 29, 2001	515	2.42
Romeo, Lydia and Bullethead sue Steve for damaging their pager and the case is heard on the Judge Mathis Show. Meanwhile, Cedric sends erotic e-mails to Lovita posing as a secret admirer, not realizing that she knows that the missives are from him. When Judge Greg Mathis comes to the school's Career Day, Steve makes the mistake of having the television courtroom judge's new Mercedes Benz towed from his personal parking space. Then, as Judge Mathis is making a presentation to his class, Steve confiscates an electronic messaging device. However, insisting it is a computer and doesn't violate school policy, Romeo, Bullethead and Lovita protest. When Steve finally returns a broken messaging device, Bullethead, Romeo and Lydia decide to take their case to Judge Mathis' TV courtroom. Upon learning of the lawsuit, Regina insists on joining Steve to help defend the school's reputation. Meanwhile, when Lovita fails to acknowledge his erotic e-mail, Cedric is certain that she's having an affair. But when he confronts her about it, Lovita says she knew all along that the sexy message was from him. In Judge Mathis' courtroom, Romeo, Bullethead and Lydia produce persuasive evidence that the electronic messaging device is a computer that falls well within the school's guidelines. But Steve clumsily undercuts his own case by offering to help pay for the cost of having the judge's car towed. Struggling to overcome charges of bribery, he then calls Lydia as a surprise witness. And despite testimony that proves Steve wasn't responsible for breaking the messaging device, Judge Mathis decides in favor of the kids. Finally, Mathis gets his own revenge by having Steve's car towed.
107	20	"Addicted to Love and Whatnot"	Stan Lathan	Manny Basanese	May 6, 2001	518	2.64
Regina agrees to go on a date with Steve's old pal Clyde, but only if Steve joins them and escorts a friend of hers. Meanwhile, Lydia doesn't realize that the cheerleaders only want to hang out with her because she works in a hip clothing shop. - - - When Lovita gets a tattoo, Cedric strongly objects. Refusing to be drawn into the middle of a marital spat, Steve ushers them out of his apartment so he can prepare for a date. But when former bandmate Clyde arrives looking for some help in finding his way home, he inadvertently ruins the cover story Steve used to get Paula to come to dinner. Meanwhile, after Lydia is assigned to work on a class project with Romeo and Bullethead, the school's cheerleaders target her for friendship in order to take advantage of her employee discount at a popular clothing store. As Cedric and Lovita continue to disagree over the tattoo, Clyde falls head over heels in love with Regina. And when Steve presses her for just one date with his old friend, Regina will agree only if Steve will date a friend of hers. As Romeo and Bullethead start putting their own efforts into the project, they discover Lydia is too distracted by her new friends to do any work of her own. Meanwhile, Cedric and Lovita make up after his new wig leads her to admit the tattoo is only temporary. Over dinner, Steve does his best to send Regina's friend home early. But when Arletta refuses to be fooled, Steve finds himself spending the night with her. Finally, when the cheerleaders make it clear they have been using her for the discount, Lydia realizes who her real friends are and helps salvage Bullethead and Romeo's project. And after an absentminded Clyde forgets he ever met her, a relieved Regina decides to spend the evening with Steve.
108	21	"Last Dance"	Stan Lathan	Vince Cheung & Ben Montanio	May 13, 2001	519	2.21
Regina puts Cedric and Lovita in charge of planning Booker T's prom; Lydia thinks a boy she likes is going to ask her to the dance, but the teen has other plans. - - - Still depressed over her own disappointment years earlier, Regina delegates the planning of the Senior Prom to Cedric and Lovita. While Romeo looks to auction himself off as a date to the highest bidder, Lydia makes it perfectly clear she wants Arthur Rabinowitz to be her date. And with Arthur's help, Bullethead hopes his date will be a radio station contest's mystery celebrity. Meanwhile, as Cedric and Lovita secure the Grandview Hotel's main ballroom for the big event, Regina's prom memories continue to drag her down and shares news that Angela's father dies and she has to deal with the guilt after she faked being sick that night so he wouldn't come to visit. Steve has to deal with the various ways the boys deal with the loss, namely Don's tendency to make jokes about it. Arthur turns to Steve seeking advice about how to ask the girl of his dreams to the prom. While Steve is certain the young computer whiz kid intends to ask Lydia, he's surprised when Arthur lands a date with classmate Julie Feldman. When Lydia learns the truth, she holds Steve responsible for ruining her prom night. However, Arthur explains his father forced him to ask Julie and that he was certain Lydia would turn him down. But when Julie dumps him, Steve presses Arthur to make things right. Meanwhile, as Bullethead wins a date for the prom with the mystery celebrity, Romeo discovers his date has bad breath and has a crush on Mike by asking her out. As they celebrate their success at planning the perfect prom, Cedric and Lovita learn the hotel has been demolished. Left with hundreds of pounds of food and nowhere to go, they scramble to find a venue. Although Lydia has already booked the room for a senior citizens party, they quickly agree to share the school's multi-purpose room for the night. Finally, as Lydia's dream date comes true, Romeo does his best to cope with Samantha's bad breath. And when Bullethead proudly arrives with singer Teena Marie, Steve helps ease the sting of Regina's bad prom memories by making her the school's first ever Faculty Prom Queen.
109	22	"Love Is in the Air"	Stan Lathan	James Hannah	May 20, 2001	520	3.27
Cedric and Lovita secretly set Steve and Regina up on a blind date. Romeo and Bullethead send Lydia false college acceptance letters. Lovita suffers from mood swings. With two tickets for a Chicago Bulls basketball game in hand, Regina asks Steve to join her. Unaware of their plans for the game and worried Steve and Regina will end up spending the rest of their lives alone, Lovita asks Cedric to help arrange a blind date between them. While Cedric struggles to understand why Lovita is suddenly so sensitive and irritable, Romeo and Bullethead set out to punish Lydia for bragging about her college applications. As part of the plan to set up the blind date, Lovita asks Steve to go out with a friend. Though suspicious, he's persuaded to give it a try when the woman described sounds wonderful. Similarly, Cedric turns to Regina with an offer to date a friend of his and she gets excited when Cedric describes the mystery man. However, when their blind dates are set for Friday, both Steve and Regina suddenly have to make excuses for skipping the basketball game. When Steve admits he has a date, Regina feigns surprise. Meanwhile, as Cedric continues to struggle with his wife's mood swings. Lydia is stunned to learn the truth when Bullethead and Romeo reveal they paid a classmate to send her a series of phony college acceptance letters. Upon arriving for their blind dates, Steve and Regina are surprised to find they have been set up. Steve is upset when he realizes Regina didn't tell him the truth and they begin to argue. Yet, once Cedric and Lovita leave them alone, they decide to make the best of the situation. And though the Robinsons assume things ended badly, they wake up the next morning to discover Regina spent the night at Steve's. Finally, as a scholarship to attend Princeton brings Lydia out of her doldrums, Cedric learns the reason behind Lovita's wild mood swings: she's pregnant!

=== Season 6 (2001–02) ===
No. overall	No. in season	Title	Directed by	Written by	Original release date	Prod. code	Viewers (millions)
110	1	"Secret Lovers"	Stan Lathan	Jeffrey Duteil	October 14, 2001	601	3.25
The sixth and final season begins as Regina pulls the plug on faculty displays of affection on school grounds. The principal's newly minted relationship with Steve prompts the edict after the music man tries to kiss her at school. Regina ushers her co-workers into her office and tells them that they all need to set an example for the students regarding proper behavior. She is adamant that the students never find out that she is "breaking off a piece for 'Big Daddy'". However, she fails to heed her own advice and soon Bullethead catches her in a clinch with Steve in her office. Elsewhere, Cedric is upset by wife Lovita's uncharacteristic lack of interest in him, and finds odd ways to channel his energies.
111	2	"Do Not Duplicate"	Stan Lathan	B. Mark Seabrooks	October 21, 2001	602	3.27
Lovita advises Steve to give Regina a duplicate key to his apartment to show how serious he is about their relationship. Meanwhile, Lydia downplays her intelligence to help her boyfriend, Arthur, feel better about himself, as Lovita begins to feel left-out when her girlfriends seem to pay more attention to Cedric than to her.
112	3	"E-Male Problems"	Stan Lathan	James Hannah	October 28, 2001	603	3.3
Steve's parents are coming to town to visit, but to avoid the pressures of marriage he excludes Regina from their dinner plans, leaving Regina offended and Steve unable to explain. Cedric advises Steve to write down his feelings on paper to help him later explain the reasoning behind his actions; unfortunately, his venting mistakenly gets sent to Regina via e-mail. He tells Lydia to retrieve it before Regina sees it but it was too late. Regina comes over to see Steve to make up with him and he tells her he didn't intend for her to get that email. She says that she is fine with it and then they make love.
113	4	"Knit Picking"	Stan Lathan	Vince Cheung & Ben Montanio	November 4, 2001	604	2.60
Steve is confused by Regina's mixed signals when first she wants to keep their relationship casual, but then pulls out all the stops for their one-month anniversary including a romantic dinner, a hand-knitted sweater, and a bed covered in rose petals. Meanwhile, Steve allows the class members to each teach a lesson to the class.
114	5	"Principal's Pet"	Stan Lathan	Kenneth Braun	November 11, 2001	605	2.63
In response to staff rumors of favoritism, Regina makes Steve proctor a test during the annual faculty luncheon. But a disturbance in the cafeteria causes him to miss the appointment, which allows Romeo and Bullethead to cheat on the exam. Meanwhile, Cedric and Lovita try to con their way into getting their still unborn child accepted into a prestigious school for children.
115	6	"Dual Intentions"	Stan Lathan	Manny Basanese	November 18, 2001	606	3.7
Regina goes on a singles outing that she booked prior to dating Steve, and when she calls him, another woman answers. Meanwhile, Lovita wants Cedric to sell his car so they can buy a minivan.
116	7	"Dissin' Cousins"	Stan Lathan	Kenneth Braun	November 25, 2001	607	3.75
Regina's cousin stays in the principal's home to spend Thanksgiving after leaving her husband, but Steve and the family enjoy the holidays watching the Chicago Bears play a Thanksgiving game from a luxury box, her arrogance irks Regina's friends, particularly Steve, whose holiday plans with his main squeeze are jeopardized, however, Steve takes a tour and manages to black out the entire Soldier Field. This leaves Angela and the boys to fend for themselves in the box with a Hollywood producer but are thrilled when B.B. King drops in. Meanwhile, Cedric and his family showed up for Thanksgiving dinner and Lovita both think that they've accidentally learned the gender of their unborn child after promising each other that they would wait until the birth.
117	8	"Stuck On You"	Stan Lathan	Vince Cheung & Ben Montanio	December 9, 2001	608	2.92
Steve plans an elegant dinner party with friends in celebration of his relationship with Regina, but when Regina starts assuming responsibility and takes over with the details and planning of the dinner party, Steve reminds her that "Big Daddy" is in charge at "home" and Regina is in charge at work, which leads to an argument about her bossy demeanor. Meanwhile, Cedric is hesitant to participate in Lovita's childbirth class; and Steve's students plan senior-class pranks.
118	9	"Hate Thy Neighbor"	Stan Lathan	Vince Cheung & Ben Montanio	January 6, 2002	609	2.72
Steve (Steve Harvey) and Lovita (Terri J. Vaughn) square off against each other in sleazy campaign tactics when they run for one open slot on the apartment building tenant board and the usually friendly "game night" turns ugly.
119	10	"The Shower Planner"	Stan Lathan	James Hannah	January 13, 2002	610	3.1
In the midst of planning Lovita's (Terri J. Vaughn) baby shower, Regina (Wendy Raquel Robinson) has to suddenly leave town and rely on Steve (Steve Harvey) to plan the shower, leaving all of the shower games, goodie bags and girlie details in "Big Daddy's" hands. Meanwhile, Romeo and Bullethead create a stack of fake teacher evaluations aimed at discrediting Mr Hightower.
120	11	"My Fair Homegirl"	Stan Lathan	Kenneth Braun & James Hannah	January 20, 2002	611	2.8
Regina hires a new assistant to fill in while Lovita is on maternity leave, but after Regina gives the homely girl a killer makeover, she thinks Steve may be making a play for her. Meanwhile Romeo tries to decide whether to go to college or go to work with his father driving a cab, as Lydia muses on her college dorm assignment to roommate, Laquitia Jefferson.
121	12	"The Graduates"	Stan Lathan	Vince Cheung & Ben Montanio	February 10, 2002	613	2.98
Steve is a little too enthusiastic in his glee over Romeo, Bullethead, and Lydia's impending graduation, especially when Lydia wins the class-valedictorian race and Romeo is voted the senior speaker for commencement. Meanwhile, Steve and Regina compete with each other over who can book the coolest celebrity to speak at the commencement ceremony.
122	13	"California or Bust-Up"	Stan Lathan	Manny Basanese & Winifred Hervey	February 17, 2002	612	3.37
In the series finale, Regina accepts a great job opportunity in California and asks Steve to leave his life in Chicago, and move with her. Steve has to decide whether or not to let the love of his life walk out of his life forever, or take a chance on love in a far away place.

== See also ==
- Steve Harvey
- The Steve Harvey Show
- List of Award Nominations received by The Steve Harvey Show
- The Steve Harvey Morning Show
