= Sister, Sister (TV series) =

American television sitcom (1994–1999)

- Genre: Sitcom
- Created by: Kim Bass; Gary Gilbert; Fred Shafferman
- Starring: Tia Mowry; Tamera Mowry; Jackée Harry; Tim Reid; Marques Houston; RonReaco Lee; Deon Richmond
- Theme music composer: Tim Heintz, Randy Petersen and Kevin Quinn (entire run); Kurt Farquhar (seasons 5–6)
- Opening theme: "Sister, Sister" (main title theme)
- Composers: Kurt Farquhar (seasons 1, 2, 4, 5, and 6); Paul A. Kreiling (season 3)
- Country of origin: United States
- Original language: English
- No. of seasons: 6
- No. of episodes: 119 (list of episodes)

Production
- Executive producers: Suzanne de Passe; Suzanne Coston; (both; entire run); Sy Rosen (seasons 1–2); Brian Pollack & Mert Rich (season 3); Leslie Ray & David Steven Simon (both; season 4); Rick Hawkins (seasons 5–6)
- Camera setup: Videotape; Multi-camera
- Running time: 26 minutes
- Production companies: de Passe Entertainment; Paramount Television

Original release
- Network: ABC
- Release: April 1, 1994 – April 28, 1995
- Network: The WB
- Release: September 6, 1995 – May 23, 1999

Sister, Sister is an American television sitcom starring Tia and Tamera Mowry as identical twin sisters separated at birth who are reunited as adolescents. It aired on ABC from April 1, 1994, to April 28, 1995, as part of its TGIF comedy lineup, and later on The WB from September 6, 1995, to May 23, 1999, airing 119 episodes over six seasons. The cast consisted of the Mowry sisters with Jackée Harry and Tim Reid costarring as their respective adoptive parents, alongside Marques Houston as their annoying neighbor Roger. RonReaco Lee and Deon Richmond later joined the cast in the fifth season as the sisters' love interests.

The series was created by Kim Bass, Gary Gilbert, and Fred Shafferman, and a production of de Passe Entertainment in association with Paramount Television. The series was then picked up by The WB in 1995 after ABC canceled it that same year, as a replacement for Muscle on its Wednesday night lineup, where it aired for an additional four seasons until May 1999. In 2018, a potential revival of Sister, Sister was confirmed, but was not pursued due to a lack of interest and copyright issues.

== Overview ==
In the pilot episode, Tia Landry (Tia Mowry) and Tamera Campbell (Tamera Mowry) break the fourth wall and explain that the two girls are twin sisters who were separated at birth after being adopted by different families and that they found each other by chance while they were shopping at the same clothing store at a mall in Detroit. To give the girls the opportunity to grow up together, Tamera's father Ray Campbell (Tim Reid), an affluent local businessman, invites Tia and her mother Lisa Landry (Jackée Harry), a struggling but hardworking seamstress, to leave their small inner city apartment and live with him and Tamera in their large home in the suburbs.

The girls make an effort to spend as much time as they can with one another, even choosing to share a bedroom and TV set, and quickly develop a deep bond. However, as time progresses, their differences begin to show. Tia is sensible, academic, and introverted while Tamera is frivolous, materialistic, and outgoing; Tia often urges Tamera to behave and take life more seriously while Tamera often urges Tia to break the rules and have more fun. Their personalities clash at times but they are always able to work through their disagreements, either on their own or with the help of their parents or friends. As the girls mature, they realize that being twins doesn't mean they have to be the same person or have the same life so they begin to embrace their individuality.

In addition to Reid and Harry in supporting roles as girls' adoptive parents, Marques Houston appeared on the show from 1994 to 1998 as Roger Evans, the Campbell-Landry family's well-meaning but annoying neighbor who is in love with both Tia and Tamera, and RonReaco Lee and Deon Richmond appeared as Tyreke Scott and Jordan Bennett, the girls' college boyfriends from 1997 to 1999.

== Episodes ==
Season	Episodes	Originally released		
Season	Episodes	First released	Last released	Network
1	12	April 1, 1994	September 6, 1994	ABC
2	19	November 16, 1994	April 28, 1995	ABC
3	22	September 6, 1995	May 15, 1996	The WB
4	22	September 4, 1996	May 14, 1997	The WB
5	22	September 10, 1997	May 17, 1998	The WB
6	22	September 13, 1998	May 23, 1999	The WB

== Characters ==
=== Main ===
The main original cast of Sister, Sister (from left to right), Tia Mowry, Jackée Harry, Tim Reid, and Tamera Mowry as Tia and Lisa Landry and Ray and Tamera Campbell

- Tia Mowry as Tia Landry
- Tamera Mowry as Tamera Campbell
- Jackée Harry as Lisa Landry
- Tim Reid as Ray Campbell
- Marques Houston as Roger Evans (seasons 1–5; guest season 6)
- RonReaco Lee as Tyreke Scott (season 6; recurring season 5)
- Deon Richmond as Jordan Bennett (season 6; recurring season 5)

=== Supporting ===
- Brittany Murphy as Sarah (first season only, left before she starred in Clueless)
- Dorien Wilson as Terrence
- Victor Togunde as Steve
- Bianca Lawson as Rhonda
- Anna Slotky as Denise Mondello
- Steve Monroe as Steve
- Arvie Lowe Jr. as Ernie
- Sherman Hemsley as Jimmy "Soupy" Campbell
- Fred Willard as Mr. Mitushka
- David Strickland as Dave
- Vernee Watson-Johnson as Patrice
- Jamil Walker Smith as Mike
- Aaron Lohr as Marlon
- Christopher "Kid" Reid as Clark
- Alexis Fields as Diavian Johnson
- Senta Moses as Dot
- Richard Lawson as Victor Sims
- Rolonda Watts as Vivica Shaw
- Chad Haywood as Steven
- Gabrielle Union as Shawn
- Rachael Harris as Simone Flosser
- Greg Pitts as Chud McGraf
- Tony Carreiro as Matt Sullivan
- Eric Payne and Fitz Houston as Principal Gordon

== Production ==
For the first five seasons, the series often had Tia and Tamera, either together or separately, break the fourth wall by talking directly to the viewer.

=== Theme song ===
The series' original theme song was written and composed by Tim Heintz, Randy Petersen and Kevin Quinn and performed by Carmen Carter. Seasons five and season six feature a remix of the original featuring vocals by Tia and Tamera themselves.

== Syndication ==
=== American broadcast and cable syndication ===
The series formerly aired reruns on BET, Disney Channel, ABC Family, WGN America, Up (formerly GMC TV), Centric, Hub Network, Logo TV, VH1 (In early 2021), MTV2, and Fuse. The series currently airs on Dabl.

As of 2021, the series is available to stream on Netflix, Hulu, Pluto TV and Paramount+ in the United States.

=== International syndication ===
In Australia and New Zealand, the series was aired on Network Ten and Nickelodeon; in the United Kingdom, Sister, Sister was aired on Nickelodeon, and on Channel 4 between 1996 and 2002 as the channel had the terrestrial rights to the show.

On October 5, 2020, the series began streaming on Netflix in a number of other countries.

== Home media ==
CBS DVD (distributed by Paramount) released the first and second seasons of Sister, Sister on DVD in Region 1 in 2008 and 2009. As of September 2014, these releases have been discontinued and are out of print.

On May 4, 2015, it was announced that Visual Entertainment Inc. (VEI) had acquired the distribution rights to the series for Region 1 (encompassing the United States and Canada). It was subsequently announced on December 28, 2015, that VEI (through its deal with CBS Television Distribution) would release a complete DVD set of the series, Sister, Sister: The Complete Collection (which includes all six seasons), in Region 1 on January 19, 2016, the release date was then pushed back to March 18, 2016. The Mowry twins 2000 television film Seventeen Again is also included as a bonus disc on the Complete Collection set. On May 26, 2017, VEI released separate Seasons 1–3 and Seasons 4–6 sets of the series. Due to music copyright issues, these releases are heavily edited.

== Reception ==
=== Ratings ===
Season	Episodes	Nielsen ratings		TV Season	Network
Season	Episodes	Avg. ratings share	Ranking	TV Season	Network
1	12	11.2 (estimated)	No. 33	1993–1994	ABC
2	19	10.1	No. 60	1994–1995	ABC
3	22	3.0	No. 142	1995–1996	The WB
4	22	3.4	No. 135	1996–1997	The WB
5	22	3.0	No. 149	1997–1998	The WB
6	22	3.6	No. 133	1998–1999	The WB

=== Awards and nominations ===
- Emmy Awards

1998 – Outstanding Lighting Direction (Electronic) for a Comedy Series – George Spiro Dibie (for "Mo' Credit, Mo' Problems") (Nominated)
1997 – Outstanding Lighting Direction (Electronic) for a Comedy Series – George Spiro Dibie (for "The Ski Squad") (Nominated)
1996 – Outstanding Individual Achievement in Lighting Direction (Electronic) for a Comedy Series – George Spiro Dibie ("for "Thanksgiving in Hawaii: Part 2") (Nominated)
1995 – Outstanding Individual Achievement in Lighting Direction (Electronic) for a Comedy Series – George Spiro Dibie (for "It's a Love Thang") (Won)

- Image Awards

2000 – Outstanding Actress in a Comedy Series – Tia & Tamera Mowry (Won)
2000 – Outstanding Supporting Actress in a Comedy Series – Jackée Harry (Won)
2000 – Outstanding Supporting Actor in a Comedy Series – Tim Reid (Nominated)
1999 – Outstanding Actress in a Comedy Series – Tia & Tamera Mowry (Won)
1999 – Outstanding Supporting Actress in a Comedy Series – Jackée Harry (Won)
1999 – Outstanding Comedy Series (Nominated)
1998 – Outstanding Supporting Actor in a Comedy Series – Tim Reid (Nominated)
1996 – Outstanding Comedy Series (Nominated)
1996 – Outstanding Youth Actor/Actress – Tia & Tamera Mowry (Nominated)

- Kids' Choice Awards

1998 – Favorite Television Actress – Tia & Tamera Mowry (Nominated)
1998 – Favorite Television Show (Nominated)
1997 – Favorite Television Actress – Tia & Tamera Mowry (Won)
1996 – Favorite Television Actress – Tia & Tamera Mowry (Won)
1996 – Favorite Television Show (Nominated)
1995 – Favorite Television Actress – Tia & Tamera Mowry (Won)

- Young Artist Awards

1999 – Best Performance in a TV Comedy Series: Supporting Young Actor – Deon Richmond (Nominated)
1997 – Best Performance in a TV Comedy: Guest Starring Young Performer – Verner, Robin Marie (Nominated)
1997 – Best Performance in a TV Comedy: Leading Young Actress – Tia & Tamera Mowry (Nominated)
1996 – Best Performance by a Young Actress: Guest Starring Role TV Series – Selico, Krista Sherre (Nominated)
1996 – Best Performance by a Young Actress: TV Comedy Series – Tia & Tamera Mowry (Nominated)
1995 – Best Youth Comedian in a TV Show – Marques Houston (Won)
1995 – Best New Family Television Series (Nominated)
1995 – Best Youth Comedian in a TV Show – Victor Togunde (Nominated)
1995 – Best Youth Comedienne in a TV Show – Tia & Tamera Mowry (Nominated)

- Teen Choice Awards

2017 – Choice Throwback TV Show – Sister Sister (Nominated)

== Potential revival ==
In June 2012 interview with TV Guide, both Tia Mowry and Tamera Mowry have said they would like to reunite the cast for a reunion film. They were thinking of doing a "Twins in the city" plot, like the twins in New York City.

In 2017, rumors started developing about a potential continuation of Sister, Sister, both Tia and Tamera have confirmed that talks are ongoing and that a sequel series is very close to happening.

In October 2017, Tia Mowry stated in an interview with Entertainment Tonight that a revival of the series was "definitely closer than ever" and that she is "getting excited" about the possibility. She also said that she believed Jackée Harry and Tim Reid would be a part of the revival if it were to take place.

On January 16, 2018, while appearing on Steve, Harry confirmed the revival, stating that "it's happening".

In 2019, the reboot was put on hold indefinitely. Tia commented, "To be honest with you, I hate to pop the balloon. [A revival of] Sister, Sister kind of looks dead right now," and cited rights issues as part of the reason for the reboot not moving forward.

== See also ==
- The Parent Trap–A franchise with a similar premise
