= Winifred Hervey =

American television producer and screenwriter

- Born: May 14, 1955 (age 71); Waltham, Massachusetts, U.S.
- Other name: Winifred Hervey-Stallworth
- Occupations: Television producer, screenwriter
- Years active: 1981–present

Winifred Celeste Hervey (born May 14, 1955) is an American television producer and screenwriter. She is sometimes credited as Winifred Hervey Stallworth.

== Biography ==
=== Career ===
A graduate of Loyola Marymount University, Hervey began her career in the 1970s as a writer for The Garry Marshall Company where she wrote for the sitcoms Laverne & Shirley, Mork & Mindy, and The New Odd Couple. During the 1980s, she wrote episodes of Benson and The Cosby Show. She also penned episodes of The Golden Girls, where she also served as co-producer. In 1987, she won an Emmy Award for Outstanding Comedy Series while working on the series.

In the 1990s, she executive produced and wrote for The Fresh Prince of Bel-Air and In the House. In 1996, she created, executive produced and served as head writer for The Steve Harvey Show. The series won three NAACP Image Awards for Outstanding Comedy Series in 2001, 2002, and 2003. In 2002, she produced and wrote six episodes of the UPN series Half & Half for which she was nominated for a BET Comedy Award.

== Awards and nominations ==
Year	Award	Result	Category	Series	Notes
1987	Emmy Awards	Won	Outstanding Comedy Series	The Golden Girls	Shared with Barry Fanaro, Terry Grossman, Susan Harris, Mort Nathan, Kathy Speer, Tony Thomas, Marsha Posner Williams, and Paul Junger Witt
1988	Emmy Awards	Nominated	Outstanding Comedy Series	The Golden Girls	Shared with Jeffrey Ferro, Barry Fanaro, Terry Grossman, Susan Harris, Mort Nathan, Kathy Speer, Tony Thomas, Marsha Posner Williams, Fredric Weiss, and Paul Junger Witt
2005	BET Comedy Awards	Nominated	Outstanding Writing for a Comedy Series	Half & Half	Shared with Yvette Lee Bowser, Michaela Feeley, Bill Fuller, Heather MacGillvray, Linda Mathious, David M. Matthews, David L. Moses, Temple Northup, Jim Pond, Beth Seriff, Geoff Tarson, Carla Banks-Waddles, Chauncey B. Raglin-Washington, and Jamie Wooten
