= List of Sister, Sister episodes =

Sister, Sister is an American sitcom that was created by Kim Bass, Gary Gilbert, Fred Shafferman that originally aired on ABC and later The WB. It premiered on April 1, 1994, and ended on May 23, 1999, with a total of 119 episodes over the course of 6 seasons.

== Series overview ==
Season	Episodes	Originally released		
Season	Episodes	First released	Last released	Network
1	12	April 1, 1994	September 6, 1994	ABC
2	19	November 16, 1994	April 28, 1995	ABC
3	22	September 6, 1995	May 15, 1996	The WB
4	22	September 4, 1996	May 14, 1997	The WB
5	22	September 10, 1997	May 17, 1998	The WB
6	22	September 13, 1998	May 23, 1999	The WB

== Episodes ==
=== Season 1 (1994) ===
No. overall	No. in season	Title	Directed by	Written by	Original release date	Prod. code	Viewers (millions)
1	1	"The Meeting"	Zane Buzby	Kim Bass and Gary Gilbert & Fred Shafferman	April 1, 1994	40821-001	22.3
At a shopping mall, identical twins Tia Landry and Tamera Campbell meet for the first time, but when Lisa (Jackée Harry) gets a job in St. Louis, Tia worries she will never see Tamera again. They get lost at a local train suburb, where Lisa and Ray (Tim Reid) find them, and they discuss Tia and Lisa moving into Tamera and Ray's house.
2	2	"First Dates"	Zane Buzby	Josh Goldstein	April 1, 1994	40821-002	21.1
Having found a date, Tamera sidesteps a pact with Tia in which they agree to forgo the school dance unless they both have dates.
3	3	"Slumber Party"	Zane Buzby	Vanessa Middleton	April 8, 1994	40821-003	20.9
Tia and Tamera invite a few girls for a slumber party, but their friend Sarah is not enjoying herself because her parents forbid her to see her boyfriend, Adam, who shows up to see her. Meanwhile, when Lisa and Ray take the twins to the video store, Lisa catches her boyfriend cheating.
4	4	"Cheater, Cheater"	John Sgueglia	Phil Doran	April 15, 1994	40821-008	18.5
When Tia makes the Honor Roll, Tamera overhears Ray saying he'd tell the world if she also makes it. Tamera goes on a mission to ace a test and studies all night but can't remember anything in the morning. After Tia takes the test for her, she gets caught. Leaving the principal's office, Tia and Tamera try to make it home before their parents intercept the principal's phone call.
5	5	"Wedding Bells & Box Boys"	Terri McCoy	Josh Goldstein	April 22, 1994	40821-010	17.9
Tia is excited when a 16-year-old boy asks her out on a car date until Lisa forbids her to go. Meanwhile, Lisa designs a wedding dress for a bride, but when Ray is caught kissing her, the wedding gets canceled, and Lisa is left without a check.
6	6	"Out Alone"	Terri McCoy	Kriss Turner	April 29, 1994	40821-007	16.4
Tia and Tamera get lost on a bus ride home after going to the movies. Lisa convinces Ray to take her cat, "Little Ray," to the vet.
7	7	"The Pimple"	Zane Buzby	Larry Wilmore	May 6, 1994	40821-005	17.1
When Tia gets a pimple on her nose, she asks Tamera to go on a date in her place. Meanwhile, Lisa is excited about starting her own fashion business, but when a lady wants to return one of her dresses, Ray tries to hide it from her.
8	8	"Car Trouble"	Leonard R. Garner, Jr.	Vanessa Middleton & Larry Wilmore	May 20, 1994	40821-009	16.7
When Lisa and Ray leave in Lisa's new car, Tamera finds Ray's keys and drives his car, but hits a trash can and scratches the paint job. When Ray notices, he blames Lisa. Roger witnesses the event and cons the twins into becoming his girlfriends for a week.
9	9	"The Birthday"	Zane Buzby	Carrie Honigblum & Renee Phillips	June 28, 1994	40821-004	13.9
For the twins' birthday, Ray gives them a limo trip to Chicago for a weekend, prompting Lisa to feel like he's spoiling them. They bring their friend, Sarah, but the twins make her feel left out, which starts a fight. The girls begin taking advantage of room service.
10	10	"Love Strikes"	Art Dielhenn	Carrie Honigblum & Renee Phillips	July 5, 1994	40821-006	16.3
While on their family bowling night, Ray meets a lady named Beverly, to whom he takes a liking. After meeting her, Tia, Tamera, and Lisa dislike her, and the twins try to break them up.
11	11	"Mothers and Other Strangers"	Terri McCoy	Carrie Honigblum & Renee Phillips	July 12, 1994	40821-011	14.4
Lisa's mother comes to visit, and she tells her mother she is married to Ray and persuaded Ray to pretend to be her husband. Meanwhile, Tia, Tamera, and Roger prepare for a talent show. Note: This episode was held over and aired with Season 2, but it's still listed as a Season 1 episode.
12	12	"The Concert"	Terri McCoy	Terry Hart	September 6, 1994	40821-012	18.1
Appalled by a rap artist's lyrics, Lisa and Ray refuse to buy concert tickets for the twins. The two then win a radio contest and are awarded backstage passes but are left unimpressed upon meeting their rap idol.

=== Season 2 (1994–95) ===
No. overall	No. in season	Title	Directed by	Written by	Original release date	Prod. code	Viewers (millions)
13	1	"Hair Today"	Art Dielhenn	Kriss Turner	November 16, 1994	40822-014	15.2
Tia and Tamera just started their first day in high school. The girls and Lisa get a makeover. While Tia looks the same, Tamera's makeover goes much better, and she gets to join the "cool crowd," leaving Tia out in the cold. Things only get worse when Tia tries to give herself a makeover, and it backfires badly.
14	2	"Get a Job"	Art Dielhenn	Bernadette Luckett	November 23, 1994	40822-013	13.3
Ray puts the twins to work at the limo service, but the girls look for a way out when a handsome manager offers them jobs at a local burger joint. They want to do both jobs, so one twin goes to Rocket Burger and has to balance both, and so does the other twin at Ray's Limo Service. Note: Tahj Mowry (younger brother of Tia Mowry and Tamera Mowry) guest stars in this episode as their cousin.
15	3	"Joey's Choice"	Art Dielhenn	Carrie Honigblum & Renee Phillips	November 30, 1994	40822-015	14.2
Thinking they are the same person, a guy inadvertently asks both twins for dates; Lisa goes shopping for a handsome supermarket manager. What will happen when the twins figure out what's going on, and will Lisa find true love at long last? Note: This is the first episode to feature Dorien Wilson as Terrence.
16	4	"A Tall Tale"	Terri McCoy	Phil Doran	December 7, 1994	40822-017	14.7
The twins find their dates for a big dance to be less than perfect gentlemen. Meanwhile, Roger arranges a blind date. Tia and Tamera contemplate handling their immature dates while Roger struggles with a tall dance partner.
17	5	"It's a Love Thang"	Chuck Vinson	Bernadette Luckett & Kriss Turner	December 14, 1994	40822-021	13.5
Tia helps Tamera meet a cute guy they see on the bus. But a little too late, Tamera discovers that the cute boy is only 12. Meanwhile, Lisa tries to tell Terrence she loves him.
18	6	"Free Billy"	Terri McCoy	Carrie Honigblum & Renee Phillips	December 21, 1994	40822-018	13.1
Ray wants to make a commercial for "Ray's Limo Service" but cannot get the lines right! Tia and Tamera are also in the commercial and find a pig being abused. They take it to their house but have to hide it from their parents. When Ray and Lisa find Billy, the pig, he has to go. Meanwhile, Lisa has two "near-death" experiences, One being suffocating in soup and another with a ceiling fan.
19	7	"Operation: Deja View"	Art Dielhenn	Larry Wilmore	January 11, 1995	40822-022	16.3
The twins' appendixes hurt, and they are rushed to the hospital. After the surgery, they discover they were born in that same hospital and decide to look for their birth records. While searching, they go into a room full of deceased bodies. Ray sings to the elderly at the hospital.
20	8	"Tattoo"	Art Dielhenn	Story by : Phil Doran & Sy Rosen; Teleplay by : Phil Doran	January 18, 1995	40822-023	14.2
Tia's new tattoo, symbolizing her love for her boyfriend, aggravates Lisa. However, mother and daughter make up when Lisa admits that she had a kitten tattoo done on her bottom for the same reason years ago.
21	9	"Two for the Road"	Terri McCoy	Brian Pollack & Mert Rich	February 1, 1995	40822-019	15.7
The twins, have just received their learner's permits, so they are eager to get out on the road. Lisa teaches Tia how to drive while Ray teaches Tamera. But when things go wrong, Ray suggests they go to an empty parking lot to practice driving, ending in an accident.
22	10	"It's a Party Thang"	Art Dielhenn	Bernadette Luckett & Kriss Turner	February 15, 1995	40822-024	14.7
To reassert themselves socially, the twins plan the party to end all parties; when their guests are late, Lisa, Ray, and Roger round up some replacement guests, so the twins do not feel bad.
23	11	"Field Trip"	Art Dielhenn	Phil Doran	February 22, 1995	40822-025	16.1
On a school field trip, a cool teacher, Ed Berry, loses his temper with the twins and gives them detention; Roger's crush leads him to thievery- and soon infamy. When the museum's love statue ends up with Roger, women suddenly find him irresistible. Meanwhile, Lisa and Terrance begin fighting once she catches him flirting with the clerk, Latina, at the mall, and he catches her flirting with the mailman. Guest Star: Phill Lewis as Ed
24	12	"Put to the Test"	Art Dielhenn	Bernadette Luckett	March 1, 1995	40822-027	14.1
Tia and Tamera take the S.A.T exams, and later when the results come back, the twins get surprising test scores; Lisa tries to sell some of her clothes at a boutique store, but the owner snubs her. Guest Star: RuPaul as Marjé
25	13	"Kid in Play"	Peter Baldwin	Larry Wilmore	March 15, 1995	40822-026	13.6
Tia is offered the lead in the school play but only after Tamera forfeits the part by being late for a rehearsal.
26	14	"Dream Lover"	Chuck Vinson	Larry Wilmore	March 22, 1995	40822-016	14.1
Tia is grossed out by a bizarre dream in which she finds herself the object of her boss's affection; Lisa fixes Ray up with a blind date.
27	15	"Scrambled Eggs"	Art Dielhenn	Kriss Turner	March 24, 1995	40822-029	18.2
Tia and Tamera's school project on parenting is not what it's cracked up to be when Tamera is paired with Roger; Lisa tries to impress Terrence's religious parents, and Ray gives an e-mail dating system a try. Special Guest Star: Al Fann as Reverend Winningham.
28	16	"Smoking in the Girls' Room"	Chuck Vinson	Carrie Honigblum & Renee Phillips	March 31, 1995	40822-020	19.9
When Lisa uses the twins' new answering machine to monitor their activities, she discovers that they may have started smoking.
29	17	"Playing Hooky"	David Blackwell	Josh Goldstein	April 7, 1995	40822-030	18.3
The twins have a huge exam and are very stressed. On exam day, Lisa picks the twins up from school and takes them out for a day of fun. When they get home, Ray finds out, and he and Lisa get into a huge argument.
30	18	"Single White Teenager"	Art Dielhenn	Carrie Honigblum & Renee Phillips	April 14, 1995	40822-028	15.3
Tamera finds a new buddy named Denise while Tia's sick at home, but the twins are freaked out when Denise begins to act and dress like them to secure their friendship.
31	19	"I Do?"	Art Dielhenn	Carrie Honigblum & Renee Phillips	April 28, 1995	40822-031	16.6
Terrence proposes to Lisa, and she says yes. However, while planning the wedding, Lisa has a bizarre dream that makes her think twice about the nuptials.

=== Season 3 (1995–96) ===
No. overall	No. in season	Title	Directed by	Written by	Original release date	Prod. code	Viewers (millions)
32	1	"The Natural"	Art Dielhenn	Ernest Nyle Brown	September 6, 1995	40820-033	4.6
On the first day of school, and both of them started their sophomore year, Tia sets her sights on the new boy at school and changes her entire schedule to be in his classes - including auto repair and wood shop - before discovering he already has a girlfriend. Meanwhile, Tamera joins the school's softball team, but unwanted coaching from an overzealous Ray makes her want to escape the pressure by quitting.
33	2	"The Break-Up"	Art Dielhenn	Regina Y. Hicks	September 13, 1995	40820-034	3.9
Love is a many-splintered thing: Lisa and Terrence break up over her refusal to get married, leaving Ray friendless and Lisa upset when he tries to keep hanging out with Terrence. Meanwhile, Roger tries to use reverse psychology to win Tamera's heart but winds up kindling interest in Tia and conflict between the sisters.
34	3	"The Tutor"	Art Dielhenn	Andy Guerdat	September 20, 1995	40820-032	3.6
Tamera's scheme to get a date has her trying to fill Tia's shoes as a tutor for the football team captain. Meanwhile, Ray plays a limo driver to help Lisa turn heads at her high-school reunion, where she looks forward to meeting her old flame David Johnson.
35	4	"History a La Carte"	Art Dielhenn	Janet Lynne Jackson	September 27, 1995	40820-035	4.3
Lisa gets an unexpected inheritance from an aunt, and Ray tries to persuade her to follow her dream by opening her store with the money. Meanwhile, Ray agrees to be Tamera's extra-credit history project when the girls discover that he had been denied FBI clearance because he was arrested in the '60s - but does not tell them it was not for protesting but for streaking. Absent: Marques Houston as Roger Evans
36	5	"Grandpa Campbell"	Art Dielhenn	Robert Illes & Dennis Pollack	October 4, 1995	40820-036	3.7
A visit from shady Grandpa Campbell (Sherman Hemsley), has Ray keeping an eye on his wallet and Lisa: his father has a crush on her. Meanwhile, Tamera turns tycoon when the elder Campbell helps her turn a school project into an exercise in greed. Ray has never been a fan of his father, who he perceives as an opportunist. But when Grandpa shows up, Ray makes the best of his visit. Grandpa seems attentive to Ray and his family for the first time. Ray begins to see a new side of his father as Grandpa gets involved with Tia and Tamera's projects for their school's entrepreneur week. When Grandpa leaves, Ray feels better about his relationship with his Dad, despite Grandpa leaving with some of Ray's money.
37	6	"The Twins Get Fired"	Art Dielhenn	Steve Kreinberg	October 11, 1995	40820-037	4.7
When Tia gets promoted to assistant manager at Rocket Burger, Tamera sees it as an opportunity to slack off. But she forgets to close the freezer door one night which causes all of its contents to spoil. This incident causes Tia to be fired. Not knowing the truth, the manager offers the vacant assistant manager position to Tamera. Tamera turns into a diva in a uniform, ordering everyone around and doing little work herself. It catches up with her, and she gets fired too. The job then gets passed on to Roger. Meanwhile, Lisa must explain to her date why Ray is in her house late at night in his bathrobe.
38	7	"Halloween"	Howard Storm	Andy Guerdat	October 25, 1995	40820-038	4.9
The twins nab Ray's car on Halloween to search for a party but end up at the Canada–US border and on the late-night news.
39	8	"Weird Science"	Dinah Manoff	Larry Balmagia	November 8, 1995	40820-039	4.9
While at a school Science Fair, Ray meets Paula, the twins' science teacher, and the two grow to like each other. Taking advantage of this, Tamera and Tia begin to slack off on their schoolwork. Catching on, Ray says he will break up with Paula, so the girls will do their reports. Meanwhile, when her mall neighbors shun her, Lisa has second thoughts about her clothing business. They steal her cart as a joke, and Lisa goes crazy.
40	9	"Thanksgiving in Hawaii"	Jack Shea	Robert Illes & Dennis Pollack	November 15, 1995	40820-040	4.8
41	10	"Thanksgiving in Hawaii"	Jack Shea	Robert Illes & Dennis Pollack	November 22, 1995	40820-041	4.4
Part 1: Lisa and Terrence were going to take Tia to a timeshare in Hawaii for Thanksgiving, but since their break up, things have been different. Lisa thinks Terrence will not go, and Terrence thinks Lisa will not go. Of course, they both do go. Lisa invites Ray and Tamera to join them for a family Thanksgiving while Terrence invites Tonya, Ray's ex-girlfriend. When they all show up at the condo, chaos ensues. The twins slip out and explore the island, only to find themselves on a sailboat drifting out to sea. Part 2: The adults realize the girls are missing and set out to find them. When Tia decides to swim to shore, they realize they have drifted out from the shore, but the water is still only 2 feet (0.61 m) deep. They return to find that the adults have gone out to sea searching for them. The twins decide to head back and begin making Thanksgiving dinner, so their parents will not be so angry when they get home. When everyone is finally back at the condo, they begin to have that long-awaited Thanksgiving dinner when a tsunami warning sounds, and they all duck for cover. Note: John Ratzenberger guest stars as "Gus," the transplanted islander/handyman of the condo complex.
42	11	"Private School"	Terri McCoy	Demetrius A. Bady	November 29, 1995	40820-042	4.2
Tia gets accepted to the boarding school she has always dreamed of attending. Lisa is anxious because she has spent the savings on tuition on other things. When Tia goes to the school for a weekend orientation, she realizes that her family is more important to her than this school. Tamera, in the meantime, has already rearranged their bedroom and boxed Tia's things up. Tia does not know how to tell Lisa she does not want to go to boarding school, and Lisa does not know how to tell Tia she does not have the money to send her. Marques Houston does not appear in this episode.
43	12	"Christmas"	Gary Shimokawa	Robert Illes & Dennis Pollack	December 13, 1995	40820-044	4.6
Grandpa Campbell returns for the holidays, and he owes $1,000 to a loan shark, which Tia, Tamera, and Lisa secretly repay with money they'd been saving to buy Christmas gifts.
44	13	"Double Double Date"	Terri McCoy	Regina Y. Hicks	January 10, 1996	40820-043	5.6
Tia's originally dateless night turns into double trouble when she accepts two invitations to the same party - and then enlists Tamera's help keeping her dates apart.
45	14	"Reality Really Bites"	Art Dielhenn	Ernest Nyle Brown	January 31, 1996	40820-046	4.1
Tia's film project, which begins as a comedy, turns tragic when she manipulates her family - including a lovesick Tamera - to make her documentary more interesting with the help of Roger. When it came time to screen her film, she scrapped all the manipulated footage and replaced it with an apology to her family.
46	15	"The Volunteers"	J.D. Lobue	Janet Lynn Jackson	February 7, 1996	40820-045	4.5
When Tia and Tamera volunteer for community service at a retirement home, Tamera's charge, Edgar (Milton Berle), proves to be more than she can handle. Meanwhile, Ray's shot as a teacher becomes a snooze-fest for his students.
47	16	"Valentine's Day"	Art Dielhenn	Andy Guerdat	February 14, 1996	40820-048	4.2
Tia is messing around with everybody's minds when she tries to apply techniques she learned in psychology class to Tamera, Ray, and Lisa when she discovers that Ray and Lisa have exchanged valentines. Meanwhile, Tamera goes to the Valentine's Day Dance with Roger after the boy she originally asked to go with rejects her.
48	17	"Paper or Plastic?"	Art Dielhenn	Steve Sullivan & Ursula Ziegler	February 21, 1996	40820-049	4.2
When several of Terrence's workers go on strike at the grocery store hoping to get higher wages, Terrence asks Tia and Tamera to work for him. Tamera takes Terrence up on his offer, and when Tia sees Tamera living it up on the wages, she quickly abandons her principles and begins working at the store. They begin feeling exploited when they find out they are working for no benefits and half the money as regular workers. They tell Terrence they and the other replacement workers will go on strike unless they are better compensated. Their threat causes Terrence to agree with his regular workers, leaving Tia, Tamera, and the rest of the replacement workers unemployed.
49	18	"The Piano Lesson"	Art Dielhenn	Dave Digregorio & Arnie Wess	February 28, 1996	40820-047	4.5
Ray tries to encourage Tamera by over-praising her piano playing, but the truth comes out at a recital — much to Tamera's embarrassment. Meanwhile, Lisa organizes a yard sale that becomes an expensive proposition for Ray.
50	19	"Summer Bummer"	Jackée Harry	Brian Pollack & Mert Rich	March 13, 1996	40820-052	5.3
Everyone's fooled when the twins switch identities for the summer — so Tia can get close to a boy, and Tamera can escape summer school — until their grandfather shows up and sends everyone into an uproar.
51	20	"The Candidate"	John Ratzenberger	Story by : DeShawn Schneider & Monika Mikkelsen; Teleplay by : Robert Illes & Dennis Pollack	May 1, 1996	40820-050	3.3
Tamera enlists Tia's aid to compete with Rhonda for class president in the school election, but after she's elected, she quickly forces Tia out of the limelight. Meanwhile, Ray gets help from a bumbling mall security officer catching a neighborhood burglar.
52	21	"Big Twin on Campus"	Jack Shea	Brian Pollack & Mert Rich	May 8, 1996	40820-053	3.8
Tia lies about her age to her new college-boy beau Michael, making her popular with the cool coffeehouse set — and leaving Tamera out in the cold. Meanwhile, Lisa and Terrence seem on the way to a romantic reconciliation. Note: This is the last episode to feature Terrence.
53	22	"The Audition"	Dwayne Hickman	Steve Kreinberg	May 15, 1996	40820-051	3.8
Casey Kasem, an alumnus of Roosevelt High, is scheduled to return to his alma mater to dedicate a performing arts center. An audition is held to pick a student to perform at the festivities. Meanwhile, Ray bets Lisa that he can tighten his weekly budget to a measly twenty dollars, only to find out that the bet is a bit snugger than he anticipated.

=== Season 4 (1996–97) ===
No. overall	No. in season	Title	Directed by	Written by	Original release date	Prod. code	Viewers (millions)
54	1	"When a Man Loves Two Women"	Asaad Kelada	Regina Y. Hicks	September 4, 1996	402	4.9
Geeky Roger has transformed over the summer and soon begins dating Tia and Tamera simultaneously. When the girls finally discover this, they get another surprise; it turns out that Roger is not dating just them but half of the other girls at school.
55	2	"You Are So Beautiful"	Asaad Kelada	Leslie Ray & David Steven Simon	September 11, 1996	401	5.3
After an ugly encounter with last year’s prom queen Rhonda, the twins seem insecure about their looks and question Ray and Lisa about their birth parents. Meanwhile, Ray tries to think of a birthday gift for Lisa. “Absent”: Marques Houston as Roger Evans
56	3	"Gimme a Brake"	Asaad Kelada	Leilani Downer	September 18, 1996	403	4.5
In their 1993 Mazda Convertible, and out past curfew, the twins get lost and end up sinking their car in Lake Erie but choose not to tell Lisa and Ray. However, they watch the news and discover what happened to the twins’ car. But instead of grounding them, they decide to punish the twins for a lot of running around and chores that are easier with a car.
57	4	"Daddy’s Girl"	Asaad Kelada	Jeffrey Duteil	September 25, 1996	404	4.4
Tamera grows jealous when Tia begins spending more time with Ray. But when Ray invites Tia to a father-daughter dance, Tamera realizes there’s enough of her dad to go around. Absent: Marques Houston as Roger Evans
58	5	"Sis Boom Bah"	Asaad Kelada	Leonard Dick	October 2, 1996	405	4.3
Ray helps the twins bounce back after they try out for the cheerleading team and make the C squad, a.k.a. “the odd squad.” Meanwhile, Lisa’s gimmick to attract new customers backfires. Absent: Marques Houston as Roger Evans
59	6	"Kid-Napped"	Asaad Kelada	Terence Winter	October 9, 1996	406	5.3
After the twins’ rival steals their friends by hosting a party where the NBA’s Kobe Bryant is a guest, they kidnap a star rapper (Christopher “Kid” Reid) and have their party. Meanwhile, Lisa dates a doctor.
60	7	"Boy from the Hood"	Asaad Kelada	Regina Y. Hicks	October 23, 1996	407	4.9
Tia’s surprised when her childhood friend Darnell (Jason Weaver) moves back to Detroit, and while staying with the family, he soon sets his sight on Tamera. With Tamera at his heels, Tia warns Tamera that Darnell is not the same as he used to be, but Tamera ignores her warnings. Darnell escorts Tamera to a wild party in a dangerous neighborhood. Meanwhile, Lisa hangs out with one of her old pals, Patrice.
61	8	"I’ll Be There"	Asaad Kelada	Tom Amundsen	November 6, 1996	408	5.3
Happy days arrive for Tia when she gets a job at a ‘50s-themed diner. But Tia gets fed up with being seen as a twin all the time; then, the boss hires Tamera. Meanwhile, Ray becomes Lisa’s not-so-silent business partner.
62	9	"Ch-Ch-Ch-Changes"	Sheldon Epps	Stephen Neigher	November 13, 1996	409	4.4
Tia and Tamera devise an excellent plan to get Ray and Lisa together for a romantic evening. Everything is planned until Lisa’s friend Patrice visits, and everything comes to a screeching halt.
63	10	"Double Exposure"	Asaad Kelada	Ellen Guylas	November 20, 1996	410	4.7
It’s time for the yearbook photo. Last year’s photo was a mess, and this year, Tamera plans to make it her best photo ever. But things take a turn when she tries an overnight moisturizer, and her face is red and blotchy the next morning. She begs Tia to take her photo; this time, Tamera’s photo came out great, thanks to Tia, but Tia’s photo did not present her best side. Tamera is nominated for a beauty queen and is asked to the school dance by the hottest guy, Pico, an egomaniac, while Tia goes with Elliot, a school nerd. Tim Reid’s wife Daphne Maxwell Reid guest stars as Charmagne. Marques Houston does not appear in this episode.
64	11	"Some Like it Hockey"	Asaad Kelada	Jeffrey Duteil	November 27, 1996	411	4.3
After learning that girls are restricted from hockey-team tryouts, the twins sneak in with male disguises and cross-check some extremely chauvinistic guys. Meanwhile, Lisa became addicted to home shopping.
65	12	"Bring on the Debate"	Asaad Kelada	Terence Winter	January 8, 1997	412	4.44
Ray feels threatened by Tamera’s devotion to her new substitute music teacher Bill. Meanwhile, Lisa peddles her fashions on the street, but the local ladies misunderstand what’s for sale.
66	13	"Little Man Date"	Asaad Kelada	Roger Garrett	January 15, 1997	413	4.17
Tamera experiences public humiliation from her peers when Tia sets her up with her newest beau’s brother — unaware that he’s a precocious 9-year-old (Orlando Brown). Meanwhile, Lisa receives a phone call from Calvin Klein after he sees her billboard, or so she thinks.
67	14	"The Ski Squad"	Asaad Kelada	Tom Amundsen	January 29, 1997	414	4.72
When a ski trip is scheduled, Tamera, who is afraid, tries to get out of it. While at the cabin, an avalanche happens, and they get stuck inside. To everyone’s surprise, Tia goes crazy. So Tia, Tamera, and Roger shovel their way out and get to the top of the mountain.
68	15	"Cafeteria Lady"	Jimmy Hampton	Allison M. Gibson	February 5, 1997	416	4.22
Lisa gets a second job as a cafeteria worker at the twins’ school and adds zest to the lunch line; everyone seems sweet about her efforts except for Tia, who is embarrassed. But everything takes an ugly turn when the basketball team and Tamera get sick and they blame Lisa for poisoning them with her food.
69	16	"Three the Heart Way"	Jimmy Hampton	Leilani Downer & Regina Y. Hicks	February 12, 1997	415	4.28
On Valentine’s Day, Tia and Roger are mysteriously struck by Cupid’s arrow, which leaves Tamera feeling alone and brokenhearted. Meanwhile, Ray participates in a charity bachelor auction, where his plans to earn the most money backfire.
70	17	"Model Tia"	Jimmy Hampton	Leonard Dick	February 19, 1997	418	4.64
When Tia and Tamera meet an online friend, Verique, of Tia’s in person, the twins learn that people online are not always who they claim to be — although they learn that lesson the hard way. Tamera sends Tia’s picture to him, and he replies he likes it and is a photographer. Tamera is excited; she thinks if Tia makes it big, she can too, and they ask their parents to go to Verique’s place for a photo session but are forbidden. However, Tamera pretends to be Tia and goes anyway. It turns out that Verique is a fake and he acts as many different celebrities to fool people. At home, Tia and Tamera promise to never fall for something like that again when Montell Jordan knocks on the door needing help for his car. However, Tia and Tamera don't believe him. Montell Jordan guest stars.
71	18	"My Guy"	Matthew Diamond	Brad Miller	February 26, 1997	417	3.02
In exchange for tickets for a sold-out Boyz II Men concert — which Roger wasn’t successful in getting — Tamera promises Elliot, the school nerd, that she will get Tia to date him. During his makeover, Tamera starts to see Elliot as the perfect guy. Lisa goes different ways when she expands to dog fashion, which soon leads her to the top. Cory Tyler guest stars.
72	19	"Double Dutch"	Asaad Kelada	Leilani Downer	April 2, 1997	420	4.31
Tia and Tamera enter a double-Dutch contest for a family street fair, and Tia overworks Tamera, not letting her see her guy or even telling Tamera the reason why she is so driven. It turns out that after meeting an old childhood bully, Tia became obsessed with finally beating her at something. Meanwhile, Lisa convinces Ray to be Roger’s substitute dad for the baking contest at the fair. “‘Note:’” Tamera would later reference on her daytime talk show “The Real” that she had Double Dutch skills from appearing in this episode.
73	20	"Inherit the Twin"	Asaad Kelada	Kim Weiskopf	April 30, 1997	419	3.26
Tia gets some new smart friends, making Tamera feel left out. Then, when copies of Tia’s journal are passed around to the other students, she accuses Tamera of stealing it, while Tamera accuses Tia of writing in her journal that the former cheating on her math test, landing them in Student Court, their lawyers being two “smooth-talking” new kids, Trevor (Kenan Thompson) and Todd (Kel Mitchell). It turns out that Trevor and Todd fooled them both in revenge for rejecting them in front of the entire student body. Note: Marques Houston, who plays Roger, later co-starred with Thompson and Mitchell in Good Burger, released 86 days after this episode aired.
74	21	"Slime Party"	Jackée Harry	Christine Ecklund & Keith Hoffman	May 7, 1997	421	4.31
Tamera learns life is not a bowl of cherries when she and Tia are pitted against twins Mary-Kate and Ashley Olsen on a TV quiz show, where she is transformed into a human sundae due to a severe bout of stage fright from the latter. Meanwhile, Ray struggles with the idea that he may lack friends and attempts to cope with this. D. L. Hughley guest stars as Hank, the quiz show host.
75	22	"Guardian Angel"	Asaad Kelada	Leslie Ray & David Steven Simon	May 14, 1997	422	4.16
Tamera hangs out with a girl named Vanessa, making Tia feel left out. However, Tamera discovers Vanessa is a shoplifter; Ray lets go of his late wife Ellen and learns to accept Lisa.

=== Season 5 (1997–98) ===
No. overall	No. in season	Title	Directed by	Written by	Original release date	Prod. code	Viewers (millions)
76	1	"Designer Genes"	Max Tash	Rick Hawkins	September 10, 1997	502	4.12
Lisa learns of a benefit fashion show and tries to persuade one of the designers to look at her portfolio. When she fails, Tamera and Tia strike a pose and sneak backstage — as models. Supermodel Beverly Peele appears as herself.
77	2	"A Separate Peace"	Max Tash	Liz Sage	September 17, 1997	501	4.44
The girls move into separate bedrooms after they insist that they are growing apart. Note: This episode features the debut of redesigned bedroom sets for the girls, with a shared Jack & Jill bathroom between them. However, the redesigned bathroom makes an appearance in the first season episode before being formally revealed.
78	3	"Working Girls"	Sheldon Epps	Jack Herrguth & Seanne Kemp Kovach	September 24, 1997	503	4.28
Tamera and Ray have a fall-out over his new girlfriend, Vivica (Rolonda Watts), who, she says, has turned him into a "gallivanting, promise-breaking Romeo". Meanwhile, Tia lands a job at a mall bookstore and becomes enamored with a mysterious customer. Note: This is the first episode to feature Tyreke.
79	4	"Show Me the Money"	David Grossman	Felicia D. Henderson	October 1, 1997	504	4.74
Tia finds out that she isn't getting equal pay at her job, because she is a woman. Meanwhile, Tamera learns that even the best plans can go wrong when she decides to fight Tia's battle with her boss, who's paying a male employee more money; her decision to pose as Tia and demand equal pay gets her sister fired. So now Tamera has to get Tia's job back before she gets there. Will Tia lose her job, or will Tamera become "hero of the day" and get Tia her job back? Note: This is the first episode to feature Diavian.
80	5	"It's My Party"	Sheldon Epps	Rushion McDonald	October 8, 1997	505	4.69
It's Tamera and Tia's 17th birthday and the twins heed an uncle's birthday advice to "seize the day". However, they do it by skipping school and flying to Chicago for a Boyz II Men concert instead of celebrating with their parents. A series of misfortunes turns their dream day into a nightmare — especially when Lisa and Ray uncover the truth.
81	6	"Child's Play"	Jimmy Hampton	Jack Herrguth & Seanne Kemp Kovach	October 15, 1997	506	5.49
When it is SAT time at school, Tia starts freaking out, but Tamera is taking it easy. Not happy by this, the twins say they need a real tutor. After finding a tutor (Tahj Mowry), they get to work. They work all morning and Tia still does not feel prepared. So T.J. goes to plan B, making them relax. T.J. says he missed out on all the fun 'kid' stuff like riding a bike. This tempts Tamera, Tia, and Diavian to help him out. They then take him to "the place to have fun", and Tia finally chills out. Note: Tahj Mowry guest stars as T.J. Henderson, the lead character of the fellow WB sitcom, Smart Guy.
82	7	"A Friend in Deed"	Jimmy Hampton	Regina Y. Hicks	October 29, 1997	507	5.26
Tamera entangles Tia and her friends in a sticky web of deceit after she lies about being able to get a celebrity to appear at a school fundraiser. Music group Immature performs.
83	8	"Popular Mechanic"	Jimmy Hampton	Felicia D. Henderson	November 5, 1997	508	4.92
Tia's mysterious new friend Tyreke asks her out on a date which, of course, she accepts. When he arrives at the house, everyone learns that he is Ray's new mechanic whom he's mentoring. When Ray forbids Tia from seeing him, he reveals that Tyreke was once a former juvenile delinquent.
84	9	"The Best Policy"	Sheldon Epps	Andy Guerdat	November 12, 1997	509	5.50
Tamera accepts Tia's wager that she cannot tell the truth for one week, but she faces a dilemma when she spies Ray's girlfriend Vivica cheating on him. Meanwhile, a prominent client asks Lisa's opinion about the fit of a gown, forcing her to decide if honesty is really the best policy.
85	10	"Two's Company"	Henry Chan	Regina Y. Hicks	November 19, 1997	510	5.23
After Tia and Tyreke tire of Tamera tagging along on their dates, Tia decides to find her a boyfriend. Tamera has a fight with Jordan, the school newspaper editor and she has to do one of her articles over. Who will Tamera find as a boyfriend? Meanwhile, Lisa is asked to eulogize a woman she disliked. At the end, Tamera and Jordan have a heated argument which ends them telling they both like each other. Note: This is the first episode to feature Jordan.
86	11	"Mo' Credit, Mo' Problems"	Henry Chan	Rushion McDonald	December 10, 1997	511	5.77
The twins' car breaks down in a bad area and they must get help. Using a payphone they get hold of Ray. Meanwhile, Ray and Lisa go to an opera and Ray disturbs the other people around his seat.
87	12	"In Sickness and in Health"	Sheldon Epps	Jack Herrguth & Seanne Kemp Kovach	January 7, 1998	512	5.24
The twins try to reunite Lisa with her younger sister Darcy, whom she hasn’t spoken to in years. Lisa refuses, until Darcy announces that she's in need of surgery.
88	13	"The Laws"	Henry Chan	David Wyatt	January 21, 1998	513	4.67
After the twins and Diavian are engaged in a battle of the sexes with their beaus, Lisa introduces the girls to "The Laws" of dating. The R&B trio 702 performs.
89	14	"Rosebud"	Henry Chan	Felicia D. Henderson	January 28, 1998	514	5.12
Tamera feels she has something to prove when she pledges an elite sorority, but the club president has other plans for her new pledge. Meanwhile, Ray's old girlfriend Vivica "borrows" his business practices for her own use.
90	15	"Ladies in Waiting"	Sheldon Epps	Andy Guerdat	February 4, 1998	515	5.1
Tamera is excited about her new academic accomplishments, but quickly realizes they are no match when it comes to Tia's. While Tia is awaiting an acceptance to Harvard, Tamera decides that instead of going to community college, she will try to get into a 4 Year college. But when trying to get into the college of her choice takes more work than she expected, her family begins to worry.
91	16	"Ladies' Choice"	Jackée Harry	Rushion McDonald	February 11, 1998	517	5.40
After Tia impresses the WNBA's Lisa Leslie (appearing as herself) at a book signing, she's offered a dream job with the organization's media department. But accepting the job means giving up her other dream — college.
92	17	"Young at Heart"	Jimmy Hampton	Sherryll Atkins	February 18, 1998	516	4.66
The twins sneak into an over 21 dance club to see hip-hop artist WC (appearing as himself). Meanwhile, Lisa sneaks out of the house to go on a date with Aaron (Khalil Kain), a just-over-21-year-old.
93	18	"I Had a Dream"	Nancy Heydorn	Regina Y. Hicks	February 25, 1998	520	3.71
Tamera is reluctant to go on in life and finish high school. One night she dreams she encounters historical figures includes Harriet Tubman, Daniel Hale Williams, Bessie Coleman, Jackie Robinson, Madame CJ Walker & Martin Luther King Jr. who paved the road before her, only they carry the same reluctant attitude towards what they must do, and Tamera must convince them to carry on with their dreams.
94	19	"You Had to Be There"	Jimmy Hampton	Andy Guerdat	March 4, 1998	518	5.53
The girls have not left for college yet, and they are already missing Roger. But when he tags along to the mall with their boyfriends, they are sorry they ever met him. Meanwhile, Lisa tries to avoid having her picture taken by Ray and confessing her fear of cameras. This episode is a retrospective of the series from seasons 1, 2, 3 and 4 best of the 74 episodes.
95	20	"Prom Night"	Henry Chan	Doug McIntyre	April 26, 1998	519	3.83
Lisa makes beautiful gowns for the twins prom, but they have already bought their own. At the prom, they realize everyone has the same dress so they go back to the limo and get the dresses Lisa made. Will they have a perfect prom, or will it be a disaster?
96	21	"Shoeless"	Jimmy Hampton	Rick Hawkins & Felicia D. Henderson	May 3, 1998	522	3.93
In a parody of "Cinderella", Tamera is left at home to clean the house while Tia and the gang attend Jordan's party — until her grandfather (Sherman Hemsley) plays fairy godfather to make the impossible possible.
97	22	"Graduation"	Henry Chan	Regina Y. Hicks	May 17, 1998	521	3.88
In the Season 5 finale, Tamera, Tia and their friends prepare for graduation. Lisa searches to find the girls a guest commencement speaker for the ceremony while Tamera and Jordan decide on a farewell song. Tyreke feels left out in the celebration, since he never got the chance to receive his diploma. He tells Ray that he wants to get his GED after receiving a promotion as full-mechanic and that he will need time off to study. After failing his exam, Tyreke gives up and decides to take Ray up on his promotion. When Tyreke visits Tia, they get into an argument and face a breakup. Once the girls learn of Tyreke's dilemma, he takes the GED exam again and succeeds. Commencement for the class of 1998 begins with Super Bowl XXXII MVP Terrell Davis giving a touching speech and ending with Roger performing a song for his friends. Note: This was the last appearance of Marques Houston (being part of the main cast) until his guest appearance on the last episode of the 6th and final season.

=== Season 6 (1998–99) ===
No. overall	No. in season	Title	Directed by	Written by	Original release date	Prod. code	Viewers (millions)
98	1	"Home Sweet Dorm"	Sheldon Epps	Rick Hawkins	September 13, 1998	603	3.23
It's a brand new school year and Tamera and Tia are entering college at the University of Michigan with high expectations. They meet up with Diavian, Jordan and Tyreke (who also attend) and learn that their new dorm room is an athletic dorm in which they must share a private bathroom with two college jocks. Wanting to find an available dorm room in the same building as their friends, they go to campus housing and find out that there are not any vacant rooms. Diavian meets her new roommate, Simone Flosser (Rachael Harris), a bossy senior whose first impression turns sour. Meanwhile, Ray tries to turn Tamera's bedroom into his personal den room much to the chagrin of Lisa. Note: RonReaco Lee (Tyreke) and Deon Richmond (Jordan) are added to the opening credits, while Marques Houston (Roger) has been removed.
99	2	"Stop In the Name of Fun"	Henry Chan	Regina Y. Hicks	September 20, 1998	602	3.00
A college talent contest turns to a battle of wills between the twins when Tia the perfectionist agrees to direct Tamera, Diavian and Simone's girl-group routine. Meanwhile, Tyreke and Lisa attend a time-share seminar in search of free gifts. Absent: Tim Reid as Ray Campbell
100	3	"Home Court Advantage"	Henry Chan	Michael Ajakwe Jr.	September 27, 1998	601	3.17
Lisa hires Todd Banks, her handsome new assistant, to help her run errands and schedule arrangements. When Todd forgets to hire a model for Lisa's latest designs, she uses Todd instead. After realizing that Todd is not reliable, she fires him and later is sued by Todd for sexual harassment. Meanwhile, the twins and their friends all sign up for a self-defense class and Tyreke's male ego is thrown for a loop when he is subdued by a mugger who falls afoul to Tia's self-defense skills. William Allen Young guest stars as Todd's father and lawyer. Absent: Tim Reid as Ray Campbell.
101	4	"We Are Family"	Regge Life	Rushion McDonald	October 4, 1998	604	3.35
Ray decides to run for office and puts Tia, Tamera, and Lisa in the public eye. But when Tamera decides not to be supportive after being publicly embarrassed, Ray may be forced to reconsider. Also, Ray's ex-girlfriend Vivica returns.
102	5	"The Grass is Always Finer"	Henry Chan	Felicia D. Henderson	October 11, 1998	605	4.42
Tia starts to feel that her relationship with Tyreke is not serious when he becomes overly affectionate. But when she meets Keith Brooks (Brian McKnight), her new calculus professor, she becomes enchanted and soon Tia and Tyreke break up. After learning that Keith has a girlfriend, she tries to reconcile with Tyreke, but to no avail. Maia Campbell Guest stars As Shayla. Absent: Tim Reid as Ray Campbell
103	6	"Bum Rap"	Erma Elzy-Jones	David Wyatt	October 18, 1998	606	3.66
Ray supports a bill banning big concerts on campus and is surprised to meet his opponent. Goodie Mob (who appear as themselves) are to perform at the college, and Ray's opposition to the appearance annoys Tamera, who thinks he's giving them a bum rap. Meanwhile, Tia uses Tyreke and Jordan as guinea pigs as she conducts a survey on human behavior. One must go without sleep and the other without food.
104	7	"The Domino Effect"	Nancy Heydorn	Christina Royster	November 1, 1998	607	3.00
While the twins are away, Tyreke and Jordan put themselves in an awkward situation by agreeing to escort two homesick freshmen, CeeCee and Ginger, to the Homecoming dance. Meanwhile, Ray's game night with the boys is interrupted by Lisa's friends.
105	8	"Greek to Me"	Sheldon Epps	Rushion McDonald	November 8, 1998	610	4.12
Tamera's plans are interrupted when Jordan goes under cover for the newspaper to expose hazing and, in a rush to get the scoop on fraternity hazing, forgets about his anniversary dinner with Tamera. Meanwhile, Lisa and Ray try to persuade Tia into joining their favorite sororities. Guest stars Brian McKnight and Donald Faison
106	9	"My Father's House"	Sheldon Epps	Felicia D. Henderson	November 15, 1998	608	3.52
Jordan suffers Tamera's wrath when he refuses to go to church; and Lisa turns Ray's living room into a "holy sweat shop" after she offers to sew new choir robes. Guest star Kirk Franklin.
107	10	"For the People"	Henry Chan	Alison Taylor	November 22, 1998	609	3.42
Tamera struggles on what to write her essay about. She eventually writes about Ray's campaign. A few weeks ago, Ray's campaign is on the straight and narrow with the help of Clifton McNair (Phill Lewis), a veteran campaign manager. Ray starts getting frustrated that Clifton won't let him focus more on the issues people care about; the seemingly perfect Clifton turns out to be an unscrupulous manager who would use sketchy methods to get support for Ray. He convinces Tyreke and Jordan to take down an opponent's posters and signs, which was illegal. This event leads Ray to fire Clifton.
108	11	"Twins or Consequences"	Henry Chan	Regina Y. Hicks	December 13, 1998	611	3.67
A chemistry mid-term is coming up and instead of studying, Tamera decides to go out and party, but when morning approaches, Tamera is to worn out and cannot remember anything that she studied because of her partying. Tamera begs Tia to take her mid-term for her, but if caught Tia and Tamera could both face expulsion from college. Will Tia risk getting expelled or do the right thing? Meanwhile, Jordan benches Tyreke on their basketball team after several less-than-stellar performances. With the playoffs on the line, Jordan and his other teammate select a replacement with a decent jumpshot. But when they find that the replacement's overall game is incredibly poor, will they come around to reconciling with Tyreke?
109	12	"Mixed Doubles"	Henry Chan	Rick Hawkins	January 10, 1999	613	3.82
Tyreke wins four tickets to "Ragtime"; Lisa is attracted to Ray's frat buddy, Victor (Richard Lawson). Tia gets a new boyfriend named Devlin, who has an annoying laugh. Tyreke and his girlfriend Ginger as well as Jordan and Tamera go to Ragtime together. Devlin cancels his date with Tia, leaving her alone until she goes to Ragtime with Ray, who buys $300 tickets that turned out to be fake. Victor and Lisa go to Ragtime as well, but must sit behind two-timing Devlin. Victor goes to complain about Devlin's laugh to the manager, Tamera, Jordan and the others see Devlin and tries to expose him, and Tia eventually finds out the truth about Devlin. Each character interacts with each other in some way (for example, when Ray argues with the manager about his situation, Devlin overhears and gives Ray tickets to the next day's showing, as his grandfather was on the theater board). Note: Richard Lawson, Ray's frat buddy, played Jackée's boyfriend in the 227 episode "A Yen for Lester".
110	13	"Two Girls, a Guy and a Calendar"	Henry Chan	Jack Herrguth & Seanne Kemp-Kovach	January 17, 1999	612	3.57
Michigan is hosting a photo calendar contest for the guys so whoever wins will be published in the calendar. With Tia pushing Tyreke, and Tamera pushing Jordan, will things get out of control? Will this contest end valuable friendships?
111	14	"Sweet Talk"	Sheldon Epps	Angela Denise Johnson	January 24, 1999	614	3.98
While looking for a job, Diavian gives Tamera a chance she cannot say no to: being the host of the campus radio talk show on relationships. At the interview, Diavian does not do too well, but Tamera does perfect! Once getting the job, Diavian is mad because Tamera got her job. The show becomes such a hit with "Lady-T" that she needs to work on Saturday and miss a concert with Jordan. Will she find a way around this, or are Jordan and Tamera coming to an end?
112	15	"Father's Day"	Henry Chan	Rick Hawkins	February 7, 1999	616	5.20
The twins meet a photojournalist visiting campus, Matt Sullivan, and finds out he is their biological father. Meanwhile, Ray tells Lisa about a "cash-flow problem" he had, which he wasn't happy about, but "had no choice"; unbeknownst to Lisa, it was about a problem with one of his loans. While watching the news, Lisa hears about a criminal named the "Black Widower", who marries rich ladies and robs them of their money. She is alarmed when the drawing of the assailant resembles Ray. Overhearing Ray on a phone call seemingly threatening an old woman to give him her money (he was simply calling his banker, talking louder than usual as it was the woman's retirement party, and she couldn't hear him), she calls the police on Ray.
113	16	"I Know What You Did in Drama Class"	Sheldon Epps	Felicia D. Henderson	February 14, 1999	615	4.88
Tia has Diavian partner with Tyreke for a drama class assignment, and Tia herself is stuck with the teacher. One day after class while Diavian and Tyreke are rehearsing their scene, they kiss in the heat of the moment. When Tia inadvertently walks in on this, she becomes furious with Diavian and they argue about the occurrence. Diavian tells Tia that the real cause of her anger is from still having feelings for Tyreke but will not admit it to herself. Meanwhile, Tamera and Jordan attempt to hook up cable in Tia and Tamera's room to watch a big Fight on TV, but clearly do not know what they are doing, and Lisa helps them out with the job. Lisa herself has a date that a friend of hers set her up with, but she ends up chasing him away. Absent: Tim Reid as Ray Campbell
114	17	"Double Talk"	Mary Lou Belli	Rushion McDonald	February 21, 1999	617	3.6
Tamera gets sick and cannot do her radio show one night, so she asks Tia to cover for her but she ends up wimping out. Jordan saves the day but insults the callers on the radio station. Tamera cannot stand this so she goes down to the station and she Jordan have it out. The on-air arguments attract a lot of callers so Tamera and Jordan start to do the show together but cannot agree on one thing. Will Tamera and Jordan make up or will Pillow Chat be history? Absent: RonReaco Lee as Tyreke Scott
115	18	"FreakNik"	Erma Elzy-Jones	Regina Y. Hicks	February 28, 1999	618	4.45
Tia, Tamera, and Diavian fly to Atlanta to see FreakNik. When they get there and stay at the 4 star hotel, but the hotel is not exactly up to their standards. Tamera, enjoying her new-found freedom, gives herself 5 names, one for each guy she meets because she does not want to be tied down to anyone (except Jordan but not for the time being). Meanwhile Jordan and Tyreke drive to Atlanta and get lost. At FreakNik Mýa & Blackstreet perform "Take Me There" together. Also Tia and Tyreke try to rekindle a relationship lost. Will it be rekindled or just lost? Absent: Tim Reid as Ray Campbell
116	19	"Before There Was Hip Hop..."	David Kendall	David Wyatt	May 2, 1999	619	3.35
A music history lesson prompts blues singer Clarence Walker (played by Brian McKnight) to talk about the history of swing and bebop. During the lesson, Jordan shows obliviousness and no interest. Clarence notes that Jordan reminds him of an old friend, Ricky a.k.a. "The Bebop Kid". As Clarence recounts his history, Jordan starts daydreaming, imagining he was in the 1940s. In the 40s, the nightclub Clarence works at, the "Downbeat", is going out of business so Mr. Slim (Ray) has to come up with some serious money so he can pay off his debts to mob boss Big Earl. Ricky (Jordan), who is dating Mr. Slim's daughter (Tamera), decides to help Mr. Slim by having his bebop band perform at the club so he can pay off Big Earl. Guest Star: Michael Clarke Duncan as Big Earl
117	20	"Let Them Eat Cupcakes"	Jackée Harry	Jack Herrguth	May 9, 1999	620	2.26
Victor tries to give Lisa a romantic engagement she will never forget. Tia and Tamera bake a batch of cupcakes that Jordan and Tyreke sell at the college. But one of the cupcakes has Lisa's engagement ring in it.
118	21	"The Road Less Traveled"	Chip Hurd	Felicia D. Henderson	May 16, 1999	621	3.05
Tia considers taking a summer internship with the WNBA in New York. Meanwhile, Lisa worries about her upcoming wedding. Also, Jordan and Tyreke learn to deal with each other's quirks as roommates.
119	22	"Fly Away Home"	Henry Chan	Rick Hawkins	May 23, 1999	622	4.66
In the series finale of Sister, Sister, it's Lisa's wedding day and she is really nervous. So nervous, in fact, that she runs out of the church and goes to a bar and meets up with her past friend Foxy Jones. Ray later finds her at the bar and talks her into marrying Victor. At the wedding, the twins' old friend Roger Evans (special guest star Marques Houston) returns and sings for Lisa at the wedding. Even though Tia and Tamera will be separated once more, this time they knew they'll always find a way back to each other. Lisa is happily married to Victor as the series comes to a close. Finale Notes: Marques Houston was originally a main character from Seasons 1-5. He was written out when the girls went off to college in Season 6. He had started a successful singing career while acting on Sister, Sister.; The girls and their parents return to the same store, with the same confusing results for the same sales clerk, where they found each other in Episode 1 of Season 1.; Lisa is mistaken for someone named Sandra twice during the episode. Actress Jackée Harry, who plays Lisa, won an Emmy award for her breakout role as the sexy vamp Sandra Clark in the 1980s sitcom 227.
