= The Fresh Prince of Bel-Air season 3 =

Season of television series

The Fresh Prince of Bel-Air
- Season 3
- DVD cover
- No. of episodes: 24

Release
- Original network: NBC
- Original release: September 14, 1992 – May 10, 1993

Season chronology
- ← Previous; Season 2 Next → Season 4

The third season of The Fresh Prince of Bel-Air premiered on September 14, 1992, and concluded on May 10, 1993. This would be the last season to feature Janet Hubert-Whitten as Vivian Banks, as she left the show after failed contract negotiations. She would be replaced by Daphne Maxwell Reid in the show's fourth season and for the remainder of the show's run. Additionally, the character Nicky Banks was added to the cast toward the end of the season as Phillip and Vivian's newborn son, due to Hubert-Whitten's pregnancy.

During the third season, the show was No. 1 among teenage viewers and was the top-rated comedy series among viewers aged 18 to 49.

== Episodes ==
- Will Smith, James Avery, Karyn Parsons and Tatyana M. Ali were present for all episodes.
- Alfonso Ribeiro was absent for one episode.
- Janet Hubert-Whitten and Joseph Marcell were absent for three episodes each.
- DJ Jazzy Jeff was present for seven episodes.

No. overall	No. in season	Title	Directed by	Written by	Original release date	Prod. code	Viewers (millions)
50	1	"How I Spent My Summer Vacation"	Shelley Jensen	Winifred Hervey Stallworth	September 14, 1992	446951	19.9
Will returns home from spending the summer in Philadelphia and has about two weeks left before he starts his final year at Bel-Air Academy. However, he returns with a new look as well as a new beeper, which does not sit well with Philip. It angers Philip even more when Ashley starts to pick up Will's habits. Philip and Will argue about these matters, which results in Will walking out and leaving home. Will goes to Jazz's apartment and gets thrown out, He eventually comes back home after being arrested for seemingly breaking into a car. After hearing about Carlton's, Ashley's and Hilary's own secrets, Phil comes up with a plan: until Will gives up the beeper and everything else, Carlton, Ashley and Hilary are grounded.
51	2	"Will Gets Committed"	Shelley Jensen	Leslie Ray & David Steven Simon	September 21, 1992	446952	22.7
Philip and Vivian organize a cleanup effort in the riot-torn remains of their old LA neighborhood. Philip is mad at how Vivian calls him predictable and then refuses to talk to him. Will befriends a neighborhood kid named Noah (Shavar Ross) while Carlton tries to woo a girl named Simone (Rose Jackson). Noah gets mad at Will when the latter refuses to blow off his weekend plans to come back and help again. While looking around a ruined apartment, Will is ambushed by a man armed with a baseball bat, who turns out to be Phil and Vivian's friend Hector (Gregory Sierra), whose grocery store they lived above. Realizing the apartment they are in was their old one, the family flashes back to the late 1970s when they used to live in this old neighborhood before Ashley was born. Also detailed is how Philip joined the Beverly Hills law firm of Firth, Wynn & Meyer, enabling him to move his family to Bel-Air. Vivian announces that she is pregnant. Note: The episode aired shortly before "young Will Smith" guest star Floyd Roger Myers Jr.'s appearance in The Jacksons: An American Dream as the young Marlon Jackson. Myers died in October 2025.
52	3	"That's No Lady, That's My Cousin"	Shelley Jensen	Bryan Winter	September 28, 1992	446953	23.5
Enrolled at the newly co-ed Bel-Air Prep, Ashley begins dressing to entice guys, using Will's preferences in women as her examples. As Will and Carlton prepare for their senior year, Philip and Vivian ask Hilary to move out, since the baby is coming, but Hilary found a place. It is at the pool house, since they said they want her out of the house, not off the property.
53	4	"Hilary Gets a Job"	Shelley Jensen	Lisa Rosenthal & Efrem Seeger	October 5, 1992	446954	21.8
Hilary gets a job on television as a weathergirl and finds herself attracted to the anchorman, Trevor Collins (Brian Stokes Mitchell). Will helped Hilary get a job and needs her help to get exposure to save a rec center from potential closure.
54	5	"Mama's Baby, Carlton's Maybe"	Shelley Jensen	Michael Fry	October 12, 1992	446956	23.6
Carlton prepares for a dinner date with his former girlfriend, Cindy (Lark Voorhies), forgiving her for rejecting him several months earlier - but when she arrives with a newborn baby named Carlton Jr., the entire Banks family is stunned.
55	6	"P.S. I Love You"	Shelley Jensen	Linda M. Yearwood	October 24, 1992	446955	11.8
Philip intends to railroad the ineffectual Judge Carl Robertson (Sherman Hemsley), who was Philip's mentor and teacher in law school, off the bench, while Will becomes the "love slave" of Lindsey Simon (Michole Briana White), a flamboyantly generous plain student. Will accepts many expensive gifts from her, including tickets to the Los Angeles Lakers game, a Harley-Davidson and even a jacket emblazoned with a motif of his hero Malcolm X. In the end, however, she reveals that she doesn't like him. She explains that she went with him to boost her own reputation.
56	7	"Here Comes the Judge"	Shelley Jensen	Samm-Art Williams	October 26, 1992	446958	23.5
Philip prepares to announce his candidacy for Superior Court Judge against incumbent Judge Robertson, and makes it important to the family to have a good image. Meanwhile, Will calls out Jazz for being irresponsible with items lent to him, like his CD player (which Jazz returns broken in pieces) and his blazer (which Jazz shrinks). At a press conference, Philip announces his candidacy, but Will unknowingly disrupts the press conference as his reactions to a football game he was watching were mistaken as insults towards Phil. It culminates in Will being arrested for $2000 worth of parking tickets, which turned out to have belonged to Jazz. Phil also finds out Judge Robertson was responsible for the arrest during the press conference. Will angrily breaks off his friendship with Jazz, but Carlton, Ashley and Hilary convince him to reconcile with Jazz. Will does, and they become friends again.
57	8	"Boyz in the Woods"	Chuck Vinson	Samm-Art Williams	November 5, 1992	446957	15.0
Philip takes Will and Carlton on a camping trip that turns out to be a disaster when snow traps the unhappy campers before they head off to college. Will finds $25,000 in a bag. Hilary plans a date and a movie with Trevor until Jazz interrupts their date.
58	9	"A Night at the Oprah"	Shelley Jensen	Leslie Ray & David Steven Simon	November 9, 1992	446959	23.6
The Banks are invited on The Oprah Winfrey Show in Chicago as a replacement family, but what Will does not know is that there is no room for him to go. He disrupts the show, and it leads to Uncle Phil's poll ratings to go down.
59	10	"Asses to Ashes"	Shelley Jensen	Leslie Ray & David Steven Simon & Bryan Winter	November 16, 1992	446960	22.7
Election results are in and Philip fights to remain cool amid lies by Judge Robertson, which prompt Will to confront the outspoken incumbent. Chaos ensues when the judge dies after Will tells him to drop dead. Uncle Phil must give the eulogy at the funeral, where to Will's and Uncle Phil's surprise, everybody hated him and are glad he died. When Will protests that they shouldn't disrespect a man who just died, a guest asks who he is. Will sheepishly admits to "killing" Judge Robertson, and is met with applause. After the funeral, Philip gets a call from the Governor and is appointed Superior Court Judge.
60	11	"A Funny Thing Happened on the Way to the Forum"	Shelley Jensen	Leslie Ray & David Steven Simon	November 23, 1992	446961	22.7
At Vivian's Lamaze class, Will cozies up to Danny Mitchell (Vanessa Williams), a pregnant sportswriter who takes Will to a game and delivers more than just fun. When she has her baby in the back of the limo, Will must put what he learned about breathing to the test for her. Meanwhile, the family participates in a murder mystery assassin game, where Geoffrey, Will and Hilary are "shot" in the head with a dart by an unknown figure. At the end, the "killer" turns out to be Vivian, who shoots Uncle Phil with a dart.
61	12	"The Cold War"	Michael Peters	David Steven Simon	December 7, 1992	446962	22.5
Carlton is very depressed after being rejected by Paula, unaware that she has left him for Will. It is made worse when he gets a cold that Paula had. He finds out after realizing Will had gotten the same cold that Paula had. Meanwhile, Philip and Vivian receive an envelope from their doctor containing an ultrasound picture revealing the sex of Vivian's fetus. Not wanting to spoil their surprise in the delivery room, they entrust the sealed envelope to their butler, Geoffrey. Then, curiosity gets the better of them.
62	13	"Mommy Nearest"	Shelley Jensen	Efrem Seeger	December 14, 1992	446963	21.0
Will's mother tells Will that she has broken her engagement to Robert, and eagerly awaits her son's graduation so they can return to Philadelphia together. A shocked Will is afraid to tell her that he wants to attend college in California and remain with his Bel-Air family and friends, and suffers a nightmarish fantasy of what it would be like still living with his mother when he is 72 years old.
63	14	"Winner Takes Off"	Shelley Jensen	Casey Maxwell Clair	January 4, 1993	446964	23.1
Will and Carlton decide to play a trick on Geoffrey as revenge for an earlier hustle, They buy a lottery ticket with the previous winning lottery numbers and convince him that he has won a multimillion dollar lottery. However, this backfires when Geoffrey immediately quits his job after insulting the whole family. Upon learning the truth from the boys, Geoffrey is left so embarrassed he decides to leave anyway. Phil yells at Will and Carlton, Geoffrey goes to work at a restaurant, and the boys try to get him to come back home by doing embarrassing things to make him crack, such as stealing other people's food and pretending that he is their father.
64	15	"Robbing the Banks"	Shelley Jensen	Winifred Hervey Stallworth	January 18, 1993	446966	26.7
Philip is quick to judge Luther (M. C. Gainey), an ex-con Will advised him to hire as a handyman to fix things inside and outside the house. Will tries to sell an autographed baseball until it comes up missing, The Banks family goes out and When they come back, The house is robbed and They blamed Luther. The police realize it was Philip's former assistant Edward (Phil LaMarr), who confesses to robbing the house. Will and Phil apologize to Luther blaming him for robbing the house. Ashley confesses to Will about taking his autographed baseball for batting practice. Not knowing it was rare, she had wiped off the autograph. Will, angry, threatens to touch Ashley's Tevin Campbell posters.
65	16	"Bundle of Joy"	Shelley Jensen	Myles Avery Mapp & K. Snyder	January 25, 1993	446974	N/A
As Vivian's delivery date approaches, the family fantasizes about what the baby will mean to each of them: Ashley feels all but invisible, Hillary plans on using the child as her own personal slave, Carlton is angry to share the will and their father's money and Geoffrey feels overwhelmed by the family's demands, so he tricks Vivian into thinking she is having triplets. Will fantasizes his perfect family and not exactly how they turn out.
66	17	"Best Laid Plans"	Shelley Jensen	Leslie Ray & David Steven Simon	February 1, 1993	446965	27.1
Will tries to dupe a girl, Monique (Kim Fields) into intimacy. Monique will not have sex with him unless they are married, so Will arranges for Jazz to impersonate a priest and performs a fake marriage ceremony. In the end, Will has an attack of conscience and backs out, though this results in Monique punching Will and driving off in Uncle Phil's car when she finds out, and an equally angry Uncle Phil deciding to think long and hard for a cruel enough punishment for him.
67	18	"The Alma Matter"	Shelley Jensen	Lisa Rosenthal & Bryan Winter	February 8, 1993	446968	24.5
Ed (Earl Boen), a representative from Princeton University, begins interviewing students at Bel Air Prep. When Will makes a good impression in his interview, and gets a conditional acceptance by acting naturally, Carlton thinks that is trickery and decides to imitate him – only for this to backfire badly and earn him an outright rejection, as well as a suspension from school, after unintentionally making a death threat toward Ed out of desperation. After initially lying that he got in on a full scholarship, a phone call from the principal forces him to admit the truth to his furious family. Feeling utterly depressed and wishing he'd never been born, Carlton soon gets a visit from his guardian angel Tom Jones, who helps him see the light. After his suspension is over, Phil grounds Carlton for his suspension and learns why he messed up his interview.
68	19	"Just Say Yo"	Shelley Jensen	Myles Avery Mapp & K. Snyder	February 15, 1993	446969	30.6
While juggling basketball practice, education, home life and his social life, Will is offered amphetamines, known as speed, by a friend. After debating whether or not to use it, he doesn't and stores the drugs in his locker. While at the prom, Carlton finds the drugs and takes it, thinking it's Vitamin E, takes the bottle, ending up in the hospital. Will confesses to Uncle Phil and the family about the drugs in his locker and breaks down crying while Phil hugs him for his apology. Note: This was the most viewed episode of the series, with over 30 million viewers.
69	20	"The Baby Comes Out"	Shelley Jensen	Winifred Hervey Stallworth	February 22, 1993	446967	26.7
Vivian's baby is a week late, but family members and her visiting sisters Vy and Janice are at a beauty salon with Hilary when it is time to rush to the hospital. Uncle Phil and Will are stuck in an elevator with a smoker. The only people left in the house are Geoffrey and Ashley. Geoffrey can't handle a car, while Ashley, although 13, knows how to drive. The baby comes out and the family decide his name. They all come up with names like Nicholas, Phillip, Elie, Rufus, Brad, Shazam, Elton etc. before settling on Nicholas.
70	21	"You Bet Your Life"	Chuck Vinson	Samm-Art Williams	March 1, 1993	446970	24.4
Will and Carlton go to Nevada to check out a college, when their car wrecks on their way there, forcing them to stop at a funky cafe-casino, only to realize Jazz was there all the time (inside the car trunk) and they have no money to pay the car's repair, so they test their luck at the casino, but just when they got money and the car is ready to go, Carlton gets obsessed with gambling, forcing Will and Jazz to leave him there and get out. Soon after that, Will gets worried about his cousin, so he and Jazz get back to the casino, only to get to see a local bully known as Bo (played by Heavyweight boxing champ Riddick Bowe) wreaks havoc with Carlton's mind and Will's face. In order to defend his cousin, Will fights Bo instead and gets punched in the eye. In the end, They get pulled over by the police for indecent exposure.
71	22	"Ain't No Business Like Show Business"	Shelley Jensen	Story by : Jeff Pollack & Will Smith; Teleplay by : Jeff Pollack	April 12, 1993	446971	19.4
Will accompanies Keith (D. L. Hughley), a comedian friend from Philadelphia, to an audition. While there, the woman holding the auditions spots Will doing a comedic pick-up routine and gives him a spot in a comedy showcase. Will decides his calling is in stand-up comedy and decides to pursue a career as a comedian in lieu of college. This decision angers both Keith, who accuses Will of making a joke out of something he's worked very hard at, and Phil who refuses to let Will abandon his education and warns him not to set foot near a comedy club of he'll have hell to pay. Will goes anyway, however he bombs on stage as his jokes about Carlton and a date with no arms fall flat. He is saved from an angry audience by Keith, who wins the audience round with his own routine. Phil hears about what happens but decides Will being embarrassed on stage is punishment enough.
72	23	"The Way We Were"	Maynard C. Virgil	Michael Fry	May 3, 1993	446973	18.8
Philip thinks he lost his wedding ring and Series clips illustrate family recollections as the kids put together a scrapbook for Vivian and Philip, who want to renew their vows on their anniversary. Vivian tells Philip about the ring she took to have it inscribed.
73	24	"Six Degrees of Graduation"	Shelley Jensen	Bryan Winter & Efrem Seeger	May 10, 1993	446972	17.6
Vy anticipates Will's graduation with enthusiasm, but there may be discord when Vy learns Will is failing music. Carlton is named Valedictorian and has trouble coming up with his speech. To pass his music class, Will must sing at the graduation ceremony with a class of children. Will and Carlton graduate from Bel Air Academy.
