= The Fresh Prince of Bel-Air season 5 =

Season of television series

The Fresh Prince of Bel-Air
- Season 5
- DVD cover
- No. of episodes: 25

Release
- Original network: NBC
- Original release: September 19, 1994 – May 15, 1995

Season chronology
- ← Previous; Season 4 Next → Season 6

The fifth season of The Fresh Prince of Bel-Air premiered on September 19, 1994 and concluded on May 15, 1995. Ross Bagley was added to the show's cast, playing a now preschool-aged Nicky Banks despite the character being a newborn infant in the previous season. This is common in television series and soap operas. In the first episode to feature this change, Jazz expresses amazement while Will just stares uneasily into the camera.

== Episodes ==
- Will Smith, James Avery, Alfonso Ribeiro, Karyn Parsons, and Joseph Marcell were present for all episodes.
- Tatyana M. Ali was absent for one episode.
- Daphne Maxwell Reid was absent for eight episodes.
- Ross Bagley was present for thirteen episodes.
- DJ Jazzy Jeff was present for twelve episodes.

No. overall	No. in season	Title	Directed by	Written by	Original release date	Prod. code	Viewers (millions)
100	1	"What's Will Got to Do with It?"	Shelley Jensen	Barry Gurstein & David Pitlik	September 19, 1994	60066	18.3
101	2	"The Client"	Shelley Jensen	David Zuckerman & John Ridley	September 19, 1994	60064	18.3
Part 1: The episode starts off with Will working at a Philadelphia restaurant until an NBC executive captures him and brings him back to Bel-Air. When Philip opens a record store, Will believes it is his chance to pursue a career featuring music. However, when Philip refuses him a job, Will discovers that Ashley has a talent in music. He decides to create a demo tape of Ashley, and take it to a big recording executive (Obba Babatundé) who, after seeing her live, gives her a $30,000 contract. Part 2: Revelling in the success of Ashley's first single, Will implements a selection of actions hoping to make Ashley North America's biggest act. However, the recording executive secretly decides that Will is incapable of handling Ashley's career and Will is fired. Ashley, in result, becomes self-centered, having Carlton as her personal assistant. In the end, Ashley falls out of popularity and she and Will reconcile.
102	3	"Reality Bites"	Shelley Jensen	David Zuckerman	September 26, 1994	60063	16.5
Will reluctantly agrees to take Nicky to see his childhood hero, Dougie the Whale, when he makes an appearance at the local mall. When problems occur on stage, the actor who plays Dougie gets angry and shouts obscenities at the crew behind the curtain. However, Will finds this unacceptable as little kids are right in front of him, and decides to have a word with Dougie. This results in the pair having a fight and wrecking the curtains for everyone to see. Nicky, after seeing Will fight with Dougie, refuses to talk to Will. Will tries to inform Nicky that he was fighting the man inside of Dougie, not Dougie himself, but Nicky still believes in Dougie like he does Santa Claus. Right when Will is about to tell the truth about Santa to Nicky, a woman appears at the window. She invites Will to the pool house, where Santa is waiting. Santa reminds Will that Nicky has his innocence and being a little kid, it is somewhat healthy for him to think that he is real, and also reminds Will that he used to believe in him too. Meanwhile, Hilary suffers the consequences when she parks in the spot of co-talk show host, Leeza Gibbons. Guest cast: Monty Hoffman as Dougie the Whale, Traci Bingham as Woman, and Dick O'Neill as Santa.
103	4	"Grumpy Young Men"	Shelley Jensen	Michael Soccio	October 3, 1994	60065	16.3
Will tries to invite his crush, Valerie to his house for a date but she has a cousin coming over so she doesn't have the time. Will, however sets Carlton up for a double date and so Valerie agrees to come over with her cousin, Karen (JoNell Kennedy), who actually has a very bad attitude. The date ends up with Carlton and Valerie kissing, angering Will. Meanwhile, Ashley gets a driver's license but after hearing about her father's 'teaching' skills, she tries learning how to drive some other way. Guest cast: Tembi Locke as Valerie.
104	5	"Fresh Prince, the Movie"	Shelley Jensen	Gary H. Miller	October 10, 1994	60062	13.7
When Will and Carlton invite Jazz over to play poker, they are annoyed when he frequently wins. Will and Carlton decide it is time for a bit of payback. They attempt to distract him from his game, by telling him a phony story of how Will was the main witness to a murder, and how this resulted in himself and the entire Banks family being forced into the witness protection program in Alabama, hiding from the hitman John "Fingers" O'Neill. Jazz is insulted and leaves when Will and Carlton tell him the story was fake. At night, Will hears a knock at the door. He is horrified to see O'Neill when he opens the door, fleeing in fear. O'Neill takes off a mask, revealing it was Jazz all along, getting revenge on Will for throwing him off his game. Jazz laughs as he walks away. Guest cast: Brad Garrett as John "Fingers" O'Neill and Dennis Burkley as Hatfield McCoy.
105	6	"Will's Misery"	Shelley Jensen	Eddie Gorodetsky	October 17, 1994	60067	16.0
When Will wins a date with Lisa (Nia Long), he gets more than he bargained for. He discovers that she is part of a sorority, who find that men are the inferior gender- and are disrespectful and vile. When Will turns out to fit this description, Lisa drafts in her sorority colleagues who decide to play a few pranks on Will that he will never forget. She ties him up to a chair and leaves him there where he eventually frees himself by burning through the ropes with a lit candle. This is memorable for a scene where Will finds out that the prank was Carlton's idea after escaping and Lisa telling the truth (they wanted her to teach him a lesson in "respect for women"), and gets even with him by making Carlton think he killed Lisa with a rock. This prompts Carlton to run around the whole set screaming in places like the home, the academy, the audience, the cameras, etc.
106	7	"Father Knows Best"	Shelley Jensen	Andrea Allen	October 24, 1994	60068	15.9
Ashley reveals to Will that she has dropped out of Bel-Air Academy, and is instead attending public school. When parents' evening arrives, Ashley believes she has no choice and must confess to Philip that she has switched schools. However, when Will decides to pose as her father "Raul" to save Ashley's skin, she gets more than she bargained for when he tries to land a date with her teacher Miss Sharpe (Renée Jones), where she realizes that he was wearing a fake mustache. She must drop the news to Uncle Phil and after a long thought, Philip lets her finish the semester.
107	8	"Soul Train"	Shelley Jensen	John Ridley	November 7, 1994	60069	16.6
Philip and Vivian are invited to the 25th Anniversary of Soul Train, on which Philip proposed to Vivian nearly twenty years ago. But Philip is not on board because he's scared he does not have the 'groove' anymore but he hides this fear by saying that he has an important meeting.
108	9	"Love Hurts"	Shelley Jensen	Barry Gurstein & David Pitlik	November 14, 1994	60070	16.5
Will feels embarrassed after his girlfriend, Lisa, defends him when he is attacked by a man (Lanier Edwards) in a bowling alley. Because of this, Will feels tense when he is around Lisa so he tries to learn Shotokan Karate. When this fails, he decides to seek help from Jazz, who organizes a fake robbery at the Peacock. However, the situation goes awry, and ends up with Will beating up a real robber (Al Taylor).
109	10	"Will's Up the Dirt Road"	Shelley Jensen	Bennie R. Richburg, Jr.	November 21, 1994	60071	16.3
Will decides that it is time to find a job. When he becomes interested in journalism, he decides to propose an idea for a book - entitled 'Celebrities Houses... At Night'. In an attempt to impress the publishers, he takes a series of photographs - one of which shows Jay Leno dumping some coffee. However, Will doesn't know the editor (Ian Patrick Williams) works for a sleazy gossip magazine. After the editor screws up the picture and makes it look like as if Jay is dumping oil in the water and blames Will for the story, Jay decides to sue Will for slander. Uncle Phil doesn't give Will the money for court so he must find a way to deal with the damage himself (he sneaks onto Jay's show and apologizes publicly.
110	11	"Will Steps Out"	Shelley Jensen	Maiya Williams	November 28, 1994	60072	17.9
Will becomes jealous after finding out that Lisa is really close friends with a guy named Dana (Hill Harper). In retaliation, Will dates another woman named Carlotta (Enya Flack). While on the date he finally realizes that he is madly in love with Lisa. Meanwhile, fitness guru Susan Powter endeavors to help Philip lose weight – but after Will cracks just one too many fat jokes, Susan compels Will into wearing a fat suit to experience just how Philip feels. Annoyed with Carlton's various questions, Susan leaves. Will and Lisa officially start dating, leading Will to give his little black book to Carlton. When Carlton takes it, an illuminating light surrounds him. He proclaims that he "feels the power".
111	12	"Same Game, Next Season"	Shelley Jensen	David Zuckerman	December 12, 1994	60073	15.6
When Lisa invites her father Fred (John Amos) down for the weekend, he takes an immediate dislike to Will, as he has to any other man Lisa has ever been involved with. However, the pair soon become friends - very good friends. This leaves Lisa feeling neglected, as her father would rather spend time with Will than her. Will and Lisa finally decide to hatch a plan to get her father to fly back to Cleveland.
112	13	"Three's a Crowd"	Madeline Cripe	Josh Goldstein	January 9, 1995	60074	17.1
Carlton begins to worry that Will's relationship with Lisa is affecting his and Will's friendship. In an attempt to win Will back, Carlton hatches up a plan that he hopes will get rid of Lisa for good. Meanwhile, the family celebrate when Hilary announces she is moving out.
113	14	"It's a Wonderful Lie"	Chuck Vinson	Gayle Abrams	January 23, 1995	60075	16.3
When Uncle Phil schedules a date for Lisa and Will, the pair of them make up excuses as to why they cannot go. When the pair end up at the same fraternity party, both of them have a lot of explaining to do - however, they are soon distracted when they find Ashley canoodling in one of the frat house's bedrooms with a college linebacker.
114	15	"Bullets over Bel-Air"	Shelley Jensen	Maiya Williams & Eddie Gorodetsky	February 6, 1995	60076	22.4
While retracting some money from ATM for a night out, Will and Carlton are held at gunpoint by a robber (an uncredited Stephen Lang) - who ends up shooting Will and almost paralyzes him. This event rocks the whole family to the core - especially Carlton, who feels that the justice system he depends on has failed, and in turn, he considers taking an extreme measure: buying a revolver. He visits Will in the hospital and says his piece. When the two of them hug, Will feels the revolver and reprimands Carlton over how stupid he's being. He demands the gun from Carlton, citing that he saved his life and he owes him. Carlton silently relinquishes the gun and Will breaks down in tears after ejecting the bullets.
115	16	"A Decent Proposal"	Shelley Jensen	David Pitlik & Barry Gurstein	February 13, 1995	60077	19.1
While recuperating, Lisa visits Will in hospital. Will decides to propose to Lisa, who after much deliberation and thought, accepts his proposal. Meanwhile, while trying to help Will recover, Hilary unintentionally puts him in painful situations, the last of which sends him back to the hospital due to a broken nose.
116	17	"Will Is from Mars"	Shelley Jensen	Michael Soccio & Andrea Allen	February 20, 1995	60078	17.6
When Philip notices that Will and Lisa are having regular arguments, he decides to set them up on a course of pre-marital counselling. However, the pair soon realize that their problems are small, compared to some of the other couples that are also attending including The Jeffersons (Sherman Hemsley and Isabel Sanford). Upon getting in a fight with the Jeffersons, Will and Lisa realize their love for each other and move their wedding up to May.
117	18	"The Wedding Show (Psyche!) [sic]"	Shelley Jensen	Maiya Williams & David Zuckerman	February 27, 1995	60079	18.9
When Philip proposes plans for Will and Lisa's wedding, they plea to his better side to allow them to have a small ceremony. When he fails to listen, Lisa drafts in her father from Cleveland, in hope that he will have more reasonable aspirations. However, he turns out to be no better, so Will and Lisa decide to elope from Bel-Air and marry secretly in Las Vegas, in a Shaft-influenced wedding led an "Isaac Hayes" lookalike chapel minister.
118	19	"Slum Like It… Not!"	Shelley Jensen	Bennie R. Richburg, Jr.	March 13, 1995	60080	13.9
In dire need of money to finance his wedding, Will persuades Philip to purchase Jazz's apartment building. The pair see the investment as a very good idea - however things soon turn awry, when Philip receives a letter telling him that the building is in very poor condition, and that he could face imprisonment on the charge of being a slumlord. Will attempts to clear his name before it's too late.
119	20	"As the Will Turns"	Shelley Jensen	David Pitlik & Barry Gurstein	April 10, 1995	60081	13.6
Will is excited when he lands a role in TV's biggest soap opera. He prepares for the role by purchasing new outfits and writing scripts of his own - however, he is soon brought down to earth when he is informed exactly what his role entails: he must be a gay male. Meanwhile, Philip suspects that Vivian is cheating on him with a younger colleague.
120	21	"Save the Last Trance for Me"	Shelley Jensen	Maiya Williams & Eddie Gorodetsky	April 17, 1995	60082	14.9
When Nicky's school admissions officer visits the house, Philip informs the family that they must be on their best behavior. However, Will, convinced by Carlton to visit a hypnotist, is hypnotized and acts like a 4 year-old child whenever a bell rings, and the admissions officer soon falls foul to Will's latest endeavor.
121	22	"To Thine Own Self Be Blue…and Gold"	Shelley Jensen	Story by : Roger Garrett; Teleplay by : Ernest "Tron" Anderson	April 24, 1995	60083	16.5
Ernest (Charlie Robinson), an old college friend of Philip's who owns an athletics company decides to visit the family and tries to persuade Will to give bribe money to a city councilman. Phil lambastes Ernest for his decision. Ernest tells Phil that he had always been so naive. Carlton and Hilary are matched together through online dating.
122	23	"Cold Feet, Hot Body"	Shelley Jensen	Ron Burla	May 1, 1995	60084	13.3
Will instantly connects with Denise (Robin Givens), a fellow student and one who doesn't take no for an answer, attempts to woo Will and make him forget about Lisa. However, once he declines her, she goes to Lisa and becomes friends with her just to get in his pants. When Will drives her home reluctantly, she attempts this again but as soon as they kiss, Will turns the tables and leaves.
123	24	"Love in an Elevator"	Maynard C. Virgil, I	David Hoge & Dan Cross	May 8, 1995	60085	14.6
When Will, Carlton, and Jazz become trapped in an elevator, they decide to settle their differences as he chose both as his bachelor party manager. To settle things, they begin to reminisce about their past adventures together over the last five years.
124	25	"For Whom the Wedding Bells Toll"	Shelley Jensen	Leilani Downer	May 15, 1995	60086	15.8
Will and Lisa's wedding day looms, with both families preparing for their children's big day. However, they are some problems. Will and Lisa find out that they don't agree on some subjects. To make it worse, love soon blossoms between Will's mother Vy and Lisa's father Fred, much to Will's horror when he catches them in bed. When Vy announces that she is to marry Fred, the announcement causes the split of Will and Lisa, and it is implied that Vy and Fred get married although it is not shown. Will and Lisa agree to not get married, and a number of girls (Tempestt Bledsoe, Kim Fields, Garcelle Beauvais and Arthel Neville) spread the word that "Will is back on the market".
