= The Fresh Prince of Bel-Air season 6 =

Season of television series

The Fresh Prince of Bel-Air
- Season 6
- DVD cover
- No. of episodes: 24

Release
- Original network: NBC
- Original release: September 18, 1995 – May 20, 1996

Season chronology
- ← Previous; Season 5

The sixth and final season of The Fresh Prince of Bel-Air premiered on September 18, 1995 and concluded on May 20, 1996.

== Plot ==
In the series finale, the main characters all move out of the Banks Mansion to move on with their lives. Hilary's talk show moves to New York City; Ashley moves to New York with Hilary; Carlton transfers to Princeton University; Geoffrey moves back to England to be with his son; Philip, Vivian and Nicky move to New York to be closer to the rest of the family; and Will remains in California to finish his college studies. Will Smith, James Avery, Alfonso Ribeiro, Tatyana Ali, and Joseph Marcell appear in all episodes. Karyn Parsons was absent for one episode (ep. 4). Daphne Maxwell Reid was absent for five episodes and Ross Bagley was absent for eight episodes. DJ Jazzy Jeff appears in five episodes this season.

== Episodes ==
No. overall	No. in season	Title	Directed by	Written by	Original release date	Prod. code	Viewers (millions)
125	1	"Burnin' Down the House"	Madeline Cripe	Joel Madison & Adam Markowitz	September 18, 1995	60101	14.0
Philip becomes nervous when he invites his boss (Robert Munns) to dinner. He informs the family that everything should be perfect, if he has a chance of earning a promotion. However, his plans go out of the window when Will burns down the kitchen in attempting to cook dinner. Will enlists the help of Geoffrey to disguise the accident so that Philip and his boss do not find out.
126	2	"Get a Job"	Shelley Jensen	Mort Scrivner	September 25, 1995	60102	14.1
Hilary's talk show is looking for an assistant talent coordinator. Will and Carlton fight over who gets the job but Will ends up getting it. He gets excited when a famous comedian, Maurice Perry (Chris Rock) visits their mansion to discuss doing Hilary's show. He gets more excited when he is told to take Maurice's sister out. If the sister is happy, Maurice would do the show. Will rubs the good news in Carlton's face and jumps for joy. But Will ends up getting the bad bone when he sees what Maurice's sister really looks like. Ashley nearly gets in trouble for sneaking out to a party that she wasn't supposed to.
127	3	"Stress Related"	Shelley Jensen	Larry Wilmore	October 2, 1995	60103	13.5
Hilary becomes excited when she receives interest from a new sponsor for her prime-time talk show. However, on his date of arrival, Hilary is struck down with a serious case of the flu. When Will gives her medicine, Hilary overdoses and becomes loopy and crazy. It's up to Will to get Hilary back to normal and succeed with the sponsor, Mr. Stimple. Meanwhile, Carlton awaits a phone call from the bank, who he believes will hire him and Philip interviews jurors for a trial.
128	4	"Bourgie Sings the Blues"	Shelley Jensen	Tom Devanney	October 9, 1995	60104	14.7
Carlton is worried about his interview with a Princeton University representative (Kevin Brief). In an attempt to clear his mind, Carlton flees to a blues bar, where Pappy (B.B. King) is playing, and confesses to Will that he no longer wants to attend Princeton and instead wants to live out in the bar. Will is convinced he is talking nonsense, so to secure Carlton his place at Princeton, he poses as him for the interview. Milo Ventimiglia, who later became known for his role as Jack Pearson in This Is Us, has a role as a guest at Ashley's party.
129	5	"The Script Formerly Known As…"	Shelley Jensen	Felicia D. Henderson	October 16, 1995	60105	14.5
Philip hits the headlines when two jurors from his "Showbiz Madam" trial are dismissed, with no reasons given. Upon his search for new guests on Hilary's show, Will encounters one of the jurors, George Howlings (George Wallace) – and invites him on as the next guest. When he reveals his opinions about Philip and the court case live on air, Will and Hilary are left to face the consequences. It only gets worse when Jay Leno pokes fun at the Bankses during his monologue and then does a mocking tribute (parodying the Dancing Itos) to Phil on his show. When Philip gets enraged at this, Will proceeds to torture him by singing And I Am Telling You I'm Not Going.
130	6	"Not, I Barbecue"	Madeline Cripe	Kandace Yvette Williams & Matt Tarses	October 23, 1995	60106	14.3
When Carlton accidentally ruins a date Will had with his girlfriend Sandra (Garcelle Beauvais), Will forces him to come on a double date with him so he can make up with her. Carlton is paired with Sandra's friend Tiffany (Tamala Jones), whom he rejects the advances of. When the women invite the pair back to their apartment, the four play a strip game, where Will and Carlton lose their shirts. The night takes a turn when Mad Dog (Jaime Cardriche) – the boyfriend of Tiffany – arrives. In an attempt to save themselves, the pair hide in the closet – but are soon discovered when they attempt to leave. Will and Carlton climb out a window and stand on a ledge, but they unintentionally draw attention to themselves when pedestrians below believe they were going to jump, with a representative from the Crisis Intervention Unit trying to "talk them out of it". The duo later reflect on their night with Uncle Phil, and bond over the confusion of women.
131	7	"Not with My Cousin You Don't"	Shelley Jensen	Adam Markowitz	November 6, 1995	60107	16.8
In a process of testing out the new intercom in their mansion, Will and Carlton accidentally overhear Ashley talking about having sex with her boyfriend Derek (Jaleel White), who is going to be leaving soon. After Ashley finds out that Will and Carlton overheard her, she becomes furious and storms out of the house and leaves with her boyfriend. Ashley then asks her boyfriend if they are rushing because he is leaving, and they both agree that they are not ready. Will apologizes to Ashley saying he still has trouble seeing her beyond the little girl he first saw when he moved to Bel-Air. Ashley accepts his apology and says that it is not the worst thing to have a cousin who cares too much.
132	8	"Viva Lost Wages"	Shelley Jensen	Robert Bruce	November 13, 1995	60108	15.0
Will and Carlton become excited after Philip gives them two tickets to Las Vegas for Carlton's 21st birthday. As soon as they arrive, the pair hit the Casinos, but it soon goes to Carlton's head, and he becomes a gambling addict. When Will discovers that Carlton has spent all of their money – and pawned their airline tickets home – he enters the pair into a talent contest by the casino manager (Wayne Newton) in an attempt to win money to fly home.
133	9	"There's the Rub"	Shelley Jensen	Joel Madison	November 20, 1995	60109	16.0
134	10	"There's the Rub"	Shelley Jensen	Joel Madison	November 20, 1995	60110	16.0
Part 1: Hilary and Carlton volunteer to help out at a homeless shelter. Hilary is there so the media gives her a good image on how she likes to "help out" and Carlton wants a signature to help him get accepted into Princeton. Will's cure for Phil's back pain gets them in big trouble when they get arrested along with two prostitutes when they go to a massage parlor that is set up by a sting operation. Vivian, Helen, Vy and Hattie ask Will whose stuffing is better. Uncle Phil warned Will about arguments with women, but when Will did not take it, it lands him in some hot water with Vy, Helen, and Vivian. Part 2: Once at the shelter, Hilary hates the work she must do and her manager, a homeless lady who lives there (Elayn J. Taylor), tells her that what she is doing is not the point of Thanksgiving. Carlton's experience is no better: A pre-teen boy Steve (Zachery Ty Bryan) bosses him around so much he can't take it anymore. They both decide to leave but in the car, they realize that they were misbehaving and decide to return to a huge feast for the homeless people, having learned the true meaning of Thanksgiving. Phillip defends himself and Will while proving their innocence in jail and they get released, although Philip intends to have the officer who had them arrested (Mark C. Phelan) face prison time. The Banks family enjoys Thanksgiving dinner.
135	11	"I, Ooh, Baby Baby"	Alfonso Ribeiro	Tom Devanney & Adam Markowitz	December 11, 1995	60111	14.1
When the Christmas season arrives, the family are delighted when Hilary announces that her show is going to be broadcast nationally. Hilary believes that this is the event that is finally going to make her life complete – but after reaching this milestone she still feels empty. She then makes the erratic decision to have a baby–much to the family's surprise.
136	12	"Boxing Helena"	Shelley Jensen	Michael Soccio	January 8, 1996	60112	17.5
When the family signs up for sessions at a health club, Will sees it as his opportunity to meet new women. Nicky expresses an interest in boxing, prompting Will to sign him up for boxing lessons. Will soon encounters the instructor Helena (Galyn Görg) – who teaches him a thing or two about female boxers. When Will mocks the idea of female boxers, Helena decides to have a match with him, in which Will loses badly. This led him to be made fun of by Nicky and his friends, Ashley, and the other members of the Banks family. The next day, Will again encounters Helena, who starts to intimidate him. Will is calm until Helena jabs him in the face. When she attempts to go in for another punch, he grabs her fist and overpowers her. Helena gets impressed and asks Will to "take her", which he does with no hesitation. Meanwhile, Carlton feels threatened by his personal trainer, Stan (Daniel Riordan), who initially acts nice, but turns into a drill sergeant-type when Carlton gets exhausted quickly. Carlton is quickly worn out by his new rigorous workout routine, but couldn't get himself to stand up to Stan. When Carlton eventually stood up to Stan, the latter immediately signs him up for a more expensive training package, promising no rudeness.
137	13	"I, Clownius"	Shelley Jensen	Story by : David Wyatt; Teleplay by : George Tricker	January 15, 1996	60115	14.8
When Phillip starts getting threatening messages over a high-profile trial he is presiding over (based on Heidi Fleiss), The Banks do whatever they can to keep him safe. When Will, Phillip and Carlton make a trip to the gas station, they get more than they bargained for when Carlton confronts a suspicious looking clown named Juggles (Dorien Wilson) – who reveals that he is wearing a bomb, and if Phillip does not cooperate (help him get a big break on TV), he will detonate it. After a huge scene at the courthouse (where Juggles forced them to take him for a show) it is revealed it was a gag bomb and he is arrested for everything he caused.
138	14	"Breaking Up Is Hard to Do: Part 1"	Shelley Jensen	Lisa Rosenthal	February 12, 1996	60113	14.2
Ashley gets a great modeling opportunity by Jewel Pemberton (Joan Van Ark) if Will and Carlton stay out of the way. Phil's burgeoning political career has an unexpected effect on Vivian. He promises to tell her about it, but when his associates let it slip that he decided to follow through without telling Vivian, she leaves him to stay with Helen until he can straighten out his act.
139	15	"Breaking Up Is Hard to Do: Part 2"	Shelley Jensen	Lisa Rosenthal	February 19, 1996	60114	12.9
Will, Carlton, Ashley and Hilary take drastic measures to get Phil and Vivian to reconcile. Will, Carlton and Aunt Helen take them to a Hawaiian themed restaurant and sing various love songs to try to get them back together and it eventually works.
140	16	"I, Bowl Buster"	Shelley Jensen	Michael Soccio	February 26, 1996	60117	14.6
Carlton is anxious when he receives a letter from Princeton University - but soon begins celebrations after it is revealed he has secured a place. His excitement soon turns to worry after he realizes that he will never be able to live up to the kind of achievements that Philip made when he attended Princeton. When Will introduces Carlton to the world of bowling, he makes a decision that leaves the whole family in shock. He wants to ditch the Princeton idea to become a professional bowler.
141	17	"The Butler's Son Did It"	Madeline Cripe	Lisa Rosenthal	March 18, 1996	60116	14.0
Geoffrey is delighted when his son, Fredrick (Craig Kirkwood), comes to stay at the Banks'. He soon becomes a popular figure with Geoffrey and Philip, leaving Carlton and Will feeling neglected. However, when Will finds out that Fredrick stole his stash of money as well as a few other things, he finds out that Fredrick only wants money from his father and nothing more. Geoffrey gives Fredrick a lot of money to go to Butler School as he thought Fredrick "wanted to follow in my father's footsteps". He accepts only to go back to England with the pocketed money. Will tells him that even though he is taking a lot of money from his father, he will lose something even more valuable. Fredrick comes back to tell his father and they make amends.
142	18	"Hare Today…"	Shelley Jensen	Robert Bruce	April 8, 1996	60119	15.8
Recently widowed Reverend Gordon Sims (Richard Roundtree) misinterprets Vivian's devotion to the church, and in a moment of passion, he declares his feelings for her. Meanwhile, Carlton and Ashley find themselves in competition when a position arises to sing solo at the Easter service. Philip accidentally sits on Nicky's pet rabbit, Harry. Eventually, Nicky finds out the truth about his rabbit from Phillip, but is untraumatized, accepting that it is a part of life, but comically notes, "What a way to go."
143	19	"I, Whoops, There It Is"	Shelley Jensen	Mary Beth Pemberton & Tanya Ward	April 15, 1996	60124	13.1
The actor Will Smith decides to organize a clip show featuring outtakes and bloopers from the past six seasons of the series. He also records a series of interviews with the cast backstage and sends the footage to Dick Clark, who he hopes will air it on his popular primetime series.
144	20	"I, Stank Horse"	Shelley Jensen	Tom Devanney	April 22, 1996	60120	13.1
When Ashley receives a letter from the modeling agency asking her to appear in one of their sexy lingerie commercials, Phil immediately takes a dislike to the request and decides to enlist the help of an older, arrogant model (Sharon Kisekka) to teach Ashley a lesson. Meanwhile, Carlton and Hilary decide to adopt an aged racehorse that is being offered for sale by a local businessman.
145	21	"I, Stank Hole in One"	Werner Walian	Michael Soccio & Matt Tarses	May 6, 1996	60121	12.6
When Philip appeals for a partner for a golf tournament, Carlton reluctantly agrees to give Will the position – but later regrets his decision, after Philip gives Will the position permanently. Meanwhile, Hilary becomes excited when she is offered the job to co-host Live with Regis Philbin, however their diva personalities soon clash.
146	22	"Eye, Tooth"	Shelley Jensen	Adam Markowitz	May 13, 1996	60118	11.0
In an attempt to secure a popular guest for her show, Hilary manages to persuade actor William Shatner to appear to promote his new book. However, actions caused by Will and Carlton soon leave Shatner regretting his decision. Meanwhile, Ashley pleads to her father's better side when she announces that she would like to move to New York with Hilary when Hilary's talk show begins broadcasting there.
147	23	"I, Done"	Shelley Jensen	Jeff Pollack	May 20, 1996	60122	19.9
148	24	"I, Done"	Shelley Jensen	Jeff Pollack	May 20, 1996	60123	19.9
Part 1: As the Banks kids prepare to leave home, Will realizes that he has no plans for his future. Will looks for an apartment, but to no avail. Philip tells the family that they are planning to sell the house to move closer to Hilary and Ashley. This comes as a huge shock to everyone. Part 2: The Banks family prepares to move away from California, and Will confronts his lack of achievements since he moved in with them. Potential buyers (Philip Drummond and Arnold Jackson from Diff'rent Strokes as well as George and Louise Jefferson from The Jeffersons) check out the mansion as Will tries to discourage them. The Jeffersons end up buying the mansion due to what Will told George ("It all comes off"). Will says goodbye to everyone and learns of their plans for the future: Hilary moves to New York as her show has been moved there; Ashley will be living with her and attend a performing arts school. Carlton transfers to Princeton University to continue his education, while Geoffrey moves back to London to be with his son. Phillip, Vivian, and Nicky move to New York to be near their children. Phillip helps Will get an apartment and Will remains in California with Jazz to complete his bachelor's degree.
