= List of The Fresh Prince of Bel-Air episodes =

The Fresh Prince of Bel-Air is an American television sitcom created by Andy Borowitz and Susan Borowitz that aired on NBC for six seasons from September 10, 1990 to May 20, 1996. The series stars Will Smith as a fictionalized version of himself, a street-smart teenager born and raised in West Philadelphia who is sent to move in with his wealthy uncle and aunt in their Bel-Air mansion after getting into a fight in the local playground in his neighborhood. In total, 148 episodes were produced.

== Series overview ==
Season	Episodes	Originally released		Rank	Rating
Season	Episodes	First released	Last released	Rank	Rating
1	25	September 10, 1990	May 6, 1991	41	12.9
2	24	September 9, 1991	May 4, 1992	18	14.5
3	24	September 14, 1992	May 10, 1993	16	14.6 (Note: Tied with Hangin' with Mr. Cooper and The Jackie Thomas Show)
4	26	September 20, 1993	May 23, 1994	21	13.7 (Note: Tied with Dave's World)
5	25	September 19, 1994	May 15, 1995	55	10.4
6	24	September 18, 1995	May 20, 1996	55	9.6

== Episodes ==
=== Season 1 (1990–91) ===
No. overall	No. in season	Title	Directed by	Written by	Original release date	Prod. code	Viewers (millions)
1	1	"The Fresh Prince Project"	Debbie Allen	Andy Borowitz & Susan Borowitz	September 10, 1990	446801	20.1
2	2	"Bang the Drum, Ashley"	Debbie Allen	Shannon Gaughan	September 17, 1990	446802	19.6
3	3	"Clubba Hubba"	Jeff Melman	Rob Edwards	September 24, 1990	446805	21.0
4	4	"Not with My Pig, You Don't"	Jeff Melman	Lisa Rosenthal	October 1, 1990	446806	19.9
5	5	"Homeboy, Sweet Homeboy"	Jeff Melman	Samm-Art Williams	October 8, 1990	446804	22.7
6	6	"Mistaken Identity"	Jeff Melman	Susan Borowitz & Andy Borowitz	October 15, 1990	446807	19.4
7	7	"Def Poet's Society"	Jeff Melman	John Bowman	October 22, 1990	446808	19.3
8	8	"Someday Your Prince Will Be in Effect"	Jeff Melman	Story by : Bennie Richburg, Jr. Teleplay by : Cheryl Gard & Shannon Gaughan	October 29, 1990	446810A	21.9
9	9	"Someday Your Prince Will Be in Effect"	Jeff Melman	Story by : Bennie Richburg, Jr. Teleplay by : Cheryl Gard & Shannon Gaughan	October 29, 1990	446810B	21.9
10	10	"Kiss My Butler"	Rita Rogers Blye	Sandy Frank	November 5, 1990	446809	20.2
11	11	"Courting Disaster"	Jeff Melman	Sandy Frank & Lisa Rosenthal	November 12, 1990	446811	24.3
12	12	"Talking Turkey"	Jeff Melman	Cheryl Gard	November 19, 1990	446812	21.1
13	13	"Knowledge Is Power"	Jeff Melman	Rob Edwards	November 26, 1990	446813	21.3
14	14	"Day Damn One"	Jeff Melman	Cheryl Gard	December 3, 1990	446803	22.5
15	15	"Deck the Halls"	Jeff Melman	Shannon Gaughan	December 10, 1990	446814	19.1
16	16	"Lucky Charm"	Jeff Melman	Samm-Art Williams	January 7, 1991	446816	22.2
17	17	"The Ethnic Tip"	Jeff Melman	Benny Medina & Jeff Pollack	January 14, 1991	446815	22.6
18	18	"The Young and the Restless"	Jeff Melman	Lisa Rosenthal	January 21, 1991	446817	20.6
19	19	"It Had to Be You"	Jeff Melman	Cheryl Gard	February 4, 1991	446818	20.7
20	20	"Nice Lady"	Jeff Melman	Sandy Frank	February 11, 1991	446819	19.6
21	21	"Love at First Fight"	Jeff Melman	Lisa Rosenthal & Samm-Art Williams	February 18, 1991	446820	25.5
22	22	"Banks Shot"	Jeff Melman	Bennie Richburg, Jr.	February 25, 1991	446821	21.2
23	23	"72 Hours"	Rae Kraus	Rob Edwards	March 11, 1991	446822	20.8
24	24	"Just Infatuation"	Jeff Melman	Jeff Pollack & Benny Medina	April 29, 1991	446824	18.8
25	25	"Working It Out"	Rita Rogers Blye	Shannon Gaughan	May 6, 1991	446823	19.1

=== Season 2 (1991–92) ===
No. overall	No. in season	Title	Directed by	Written by	Original release date	Prod. code	Viewers (millions)
26	1	"Did the Earth Move for You?"	Ellen Falcon	Winifred Hervey Stallworth	September 9, 1991	446901	20.0
27	2	"The Mother of All Battles"	Ellen Falcon	Bryan Winter	September 16, 1991	446902	19.2
28	3	"Will Gets a Job"	Ellen Falcon	Efrem Seeger	September 23, 1991	446903	22.9
29	4	"PSAT Pstory"	Ellen Falcon	Marcus Jamal Gaines	September 30, 1991	446904	20.6
30	5	"Granny Gets Busy"	Ellen Falcon	Cheryl Gard	October 7, 1991	446906	20.6
31	6	"Guess Who's Coming to Marry?"	Ellen Falcon	Samm-Art Williams	October 14, 1991	446905	22.2
32	7	"The Big Four-Oh"	Ellen Falcon	Lisa Rosenthal	October 21, 1991	446907	23.0
33	8	"She Ain't Heavy"	Ellen Falcon	Lisa Rosenthal	November 4, 1991	446908	24.4
34	9	"Cased Up"	Ellen Falcon	Bennie R. Richburg, Jr.	November 11, 1991	446909	25.5
35	10	"Hi-Ho Silver"	Ellen Falcon	Elaine Newman & Ed Burnham	November 18, 1991	446910	25.1
36	11	"The Butler Did It"	Ellen Falcon	Efrem Seeger and Bryan Winter	November 25, 1991	446911	25.6
37	12	"Something for Nothing"	Ellen Falcon	Bill Streib	December 9, 1991	446912	24.1
38	13	"Christmas Show"	Ellen Falcon	Winifred Hervey Stallworth	December 16, 1991	446913	23.0
39	14	"Hilary Gets a Life"	Shelley Jensen	Eunetta T. Boone & P. Karen Raper	January 6, 1992	446914	25.3
40	15	"My Brother's Keeper"	Ellen Falcon	Bennie R. Richburg, Jr.	January 13, 1992	446915	25.9
41	16	"Geoffrey Cleans Up"	Ellen Falcon	Cheryl Gard and Lisa Rosenthal	January 20, 1992	446916	24.7
42	17	"Community Action"	Ellen Falcon	Eunetta T. Boone & P. Karen Raper	February 3, 1992	446917	23.2
43	18	"Ill Will"	Ellen Falcon	Leslie Ray and David Steven Simon	February 10, 1992	446918	22.9
44	19	"Eyes on the Prize"	Ellen Falcon	Bryan Winter	February 17, 1992	446919	23.5
45	20	"Those Were the Days"	Rita Rogers Blye	Samm-Art Williams	February 24, 1992	446920	24.1
46	21	"Vying for Attention"	Malcolm-Jamal Warner	Efrem Seeger	March 2, 1992	446921	24.6
47	22	"The Aunt Who Came to Dinner"	Rae Kraus	Jerry Ross	March 23, 1992	446922	24.5
48	23	"Be My Baby Tonight"	Shelley Jensen	Bryan Winter and Lisa Rosenthal	April 27, 1992	446923	20.0
49	24	"Striptease for Two"	Shelley Jensen	Leslie Ray & David Steven Simon	May 4, 1992	446924	21.0

=== Season 3 (1992–93) ===
No. overall	No. in season	Title	Directed by	Written by	Original release date	Prod. code	Viewers (millions)
50	1	"How I Spent My Summer Vacation"	Shelley Jensen	Winifred Hervey Stallworth	September 14, 1992	446951	19.9
51	2	"Will Gets Committed"	Shelley Jensen	Leslie Ray & David Steven Simon	September 21, 1992	446952	22.7
52	3	"That's No Lady, That's My Cousin"	Shelley Jensen	Bryan Winter	September 28, 1992	446953	23.5
53	4	"Hilary Gets a Job"	Shelley Jensen	Lisa Rosenthal & Efrem Seeger	October 5, 1992	446954	21.8
54	5	"Mama's Baby, Carlton's Maybe"	Shelley Jensen	Michael Fry	October 12, 1992	446956	23.6
55	6	"P.S. I Love You"	Shelley Jensen	Linda M. Yearwood	October 24, 1992	446955	11.8
56	7	"Here Comes the Judge"	Shelley Jensen	Samm-Art Williams	October 26, 1992	446958	23.5
57	8	"Boyz in the Woods"	Chuck Vinson	Samm-Art Williams	November 5, 1992	446957	15.0
58	9	"A Night at the Oprah"	Shelley Jensen	Leslie Ray & David Steven Simon	November 9, 1992	446959	23.6
59	10	"Asses to Ashes"	Shelley Jensen	Leslie Ray & David Steven Simon & Bryan Winter	November 16, 1992	446960	22.7
60	11	"A Funny Thing Happened on the Way to the Forum"	Shelley Jensen	Leslie Ray & David Steven Simon	November 23, 1992	446961	22.7
61	12	"The Cold War"	Michael Peters	David Steven Simon	December 7, 1992	446962	22.5
62	13	"Mommy Nearest"	Shelley Jensen	Efrem Seeger	December 14, 1992	446963	21.0
63	14	"Winner Takes Off"	Shelley Jensen	Casey Maxwell Clair	January 4, 1993	446964	23.1
64	15	"Robbing the Banks"	Shelley Jensen	Winifred Hervey Stallworth	January 18, 1993	446966	26.7
65	16	"Bundle of Joy"	Shelley Jensen	Myles Avery Mapp & K. Snyder	January 25, 1993	446974	N/A
66	17	"Best Laid Plans"	Shelley Jensen	Leslie Ray & David Steven Simon	February 1, 1993	446965	27.1
67	18	"The Alma Matter"	Shelley Jensen	Lisa Rosenthal & Bryan Winter	February 8, 1993	446968	24.5
68	19	"Just Say Yo"	Shelley Jensen	Myles Avery Mapp & K. Snyder	February 15, 1993	446969	30.6
69	20	"The Baby Comes Out"	Shelley Jensen	Winifred Hervey Stallworth	February 22, 1993	446967	26.7
70	21	"You Bet Your Life"	Chuck Vinson	Samm-Art Williams	March 1, 1993	446970	24.4
71	22	"Ain't No Business Like Show Business"	Shelley Jensen	Story by : Jeff Pollack & Will Smith; Teleplay by : Jeff Pollack	April 12, 1993	446971	19.4
72	23	"The Way We Were"	Maynard C. Virgil	Michael Fry	May 3, 1993	446973	18.8
73	24	"Six Degrees of Graduation"	Shelley Jensen	Bryan Winter & Efrem Seeger	May 10, 1993	446972	17.6

=== Season 4 (1993–94) ===
No. overall	No. in season	Title	Directed by	Written by	Original release date	Prod. code	Viewers (millions)
74	1	"Where There's a Will, There's a Way"	Shelley Jensen	Gary H. Miller	September 20, 1993	60031	24.2
75	2	"Where There's a Will, There's a Way"	Shelley Jensen	Gary H. Miller	September 20, 1993	60032	24.2
76	3	"All Guts, No Glory"	Shelley Jensen	Maiya Williams	September 27, 1993	60033	22.8
77	4	"Father of the Year"	Shelley Jensen	Leslie Ray & David Steven Simon	October 4, 1993	60034	21.8
78	5	"It's Better to Have Loved and Lost It..."	Shelley Jensen	David Zuckerman	October 11, 1993	60036	22.2
79	6	"Will Goes a Courtin'"	Shelley Jensen	Bill Boulware	October 18, 1993	60037	21.3
80	7	"Hex and the Single Guy"	Shelley Jensen	Barry Gurstein & David Pitlik	October 25, 1993	60038	20.3
81	8	"Blood Is Thicker Than Mud"	Chuck Vinson	Devon Shepard	November 1, 1993	60039	22.2
82	9	"Fresh Prince After Dark"	Shelley Jensen	Eddie Gorodetsky	November 8, 1993	60035	23.6
83	10	"Home Is Where the Heart Attack Is"	Shelley Jensen	Eddie Gorodetsky	November 15, 1993	60040	25.7
84	11	"Take My Cousin – Please"	Shelley Jensen	David Zuckerman	November 22, 1993	60041	20.3
85	12	"You've Got to Be a Football Hero"	Shelley Jensen	Bill Boulware	November 29, 1993	60042	25.1
86	13	"Twas the Night Before Christening"	Shelley Jensen	Maiya Williams & Eddie Gorodetsky	December 20, 1993	60043	22.3
87	14	"Sleepless in Bel-Air"	Shelley Jensen	Maiya Williams	January 3, 1994	60054	22.6
88	15	"Who's the Boss"	Shelley Jensen	David Pitlik & Barry Gurstein	January 10, 1994	60044	23.4
89	16	"I Know Why the Caged Bird Screams"	Shelley Jensen	Bill Boulware & David Zuckerman	January 24, 1994	60045	22.9
90	17	"When You Hit Upon a Star"	Shelley Jensen	Michael Soccio	January 31, 1994	60046	23.5
91	18	"Stop Will! In the Name of Love"	Maynard C. Virgil I	Story by : Gayle Abrams; Teleplay by : Gayle Abrams & Jenji Kohan	February 14, 1994	60048	19.9
92	19	"You'd Better Shop Around"	Shelley Jensen	Devon Shepard & K. Snyder	February 21, 1994	60047	19.7
93	20	"The Ol' Ball and Chain"	Shelley Jensen	Arnold Rudnick & Rich Hosek	February 28, 1994	60049	19.5
94	21	"The Harder They Fall"	Shelley Jensen	Devon Shepard	March 14, 1994	60050	19.5
95	22	"M is for the Many Things She Gave Me"	Shelley Jensen	Gary H. Miller	April 25, 1994	60060	17.6
96	23	"Mother's Day"	Madeline Cripe	Leslie Ray & David Steven Simon	May 2, 1994	60051	15.1
97	24	"Papa's Got a Brand New Excuse"	Shelley Jensen	Bill Boulware & David Zuckerman	May 9, 1994	60053	19.4
98	25	"For Sale by Owner"	Shelley Jensen	Harrison Boyd	May 16, 1994	60061	19.4
99	26	"The Philadelphia Story"	Shelley Jensen	Maiya Williams & Eddie Gorodetsky	May 23, 1994	60052	18.6

=== Season 5 (1994–95) ===
No. overall	No. in season	Title	Directed by	Written by	Original release date	Prod. code	Viewers (millions)
100	1	"What's Will Got to Do with It?"	Shelley Jensen	Barry Gurstein & David Pitlik	September 19, 1994	60066	18.3
101	2	"The Client"	Shelley Jensen	David Zuckerman & John Ridley	September 19, 1994	60064	18.3
102	3	"Reality Bites"	Shelley Jensen	David Zuckerman	September 26, 1994	60063	16.5
103	4	"Grumpy Young Men"	Shelley Jensen	Michael Soccio	October 3, 1994	60065	16.3
104	5	"Fresh Prince, the Movie"	Shelley Jensen	Gary H. Miller	October 10, 1994	60062	13.7
105	6	"Will's Misery"	Shelley Jensen	Eddie Gorodetsky	October 17, 1994	60067	16.0
106	7	"Father Knows Best"	Shelley Jensen	Andrea Allen	October 24, 1994	60068	15.9
107	8	"Soul Train"	Shelley Jensen	John Ridley	November 7, 1994	60069	16.6
108	9	"Love Hurts"	Shelley Jensen	Barry Gurstein & David Pitlik	November 14, 1994	60070	16.5
109	10	"Will's Up the Dirt Road"	Shelley Jensen	Bennie R. Richburg, Jr.	November 21, 1994	60071	16.3
110	11	"Will Steps Out"	Shelley Jensen	Maiya Williams	November 28, 1994	60072	17.9
111	12	"Same Game, Next Season"	Shelley Jensen	David Zuckerman	December 12, 1994	60073	15.6
112	13	"Three's a Crowd"	Madeline Cripe	Josh Goldstein	January 9, 1995	60074	17.1
113	14	"It's a Wonderful Lie"	Chuck Vinson	Gayle Abrams	January 23, 1995	60075	16.3
114	15	"Bullets over Bel-Air"	Shelley Jensen	Maiya Williams & Eddie Gorodetsky	February 6, 1995	60076	22.4
115	16	"A Decent Proposal"	Shelley Jensen	David Pitlik & Barry Gurstein	February 13, 1995	60077	19.1
116	17	"Will Is from Mars"	Shelley Jensen	Michael Soccio & Andrea Allen	February 20, 1995	60078	17.6
117	18	"The Wedding Show (Psyche!) [sic]"	Shelley Jensen	Maiya Williams & David Zuckerman	February 27, 1995	60079	18.9
118	19	"Slum Like It… Not!"	Shelley Jensen	Bennie R. Richburg, Jr.	March 13, 1995	60080	13.9
119	20	"As the Will Turns"	Shelley Jensen	David Pitlik & Barry Gurstein	April 10, 1995	60081	13.6
120	21	"Save the Last Trance for Me"	Shelley Jensen	Maiya Williams & Eddie Gorodetsky	April 17, 1995	60082	14.9
121	22	"To Thine Own Self Be Blue…and Gold"	Shelley Jensen	Story by : Roger Garrett; Teleplay by : Ernest "Tron" Anderson	April 24, 1995	60083	16.5
122	23	"Cold Feet, Hot Body"	Shelley Jensen	Ron Burla	May 1, 1995	60084	13.3
123	24	"Love in an Elevator"	Maynard C. Virgil, I	David Hoge & Dan Cross	May 8, 1995	60085	14.6
124	25	"For Whom the Wedding Bells Toll"	Shelley Jensen	Leilani Downer	May 15, 1995	60086	15.8

=== Season 6 (1995–96) ===
No. overall	No. in season	Title	Directed by	Written by	Original release date	Prod. code	Viewers (millions)
125	1	"Burnin' Down the House"	Madeline Cripe	Joel Madison & Adam Markowitz	September 18, 1995	60101	14.0
126	2	"Get a Job"	Shelley Jensen	Mort Scrivner	September 25, 1995	60102	14.1
127	3	"Stress Related"	Shelley Jensen	Larry Wilmore	October 2, 1995	60103	13.5
128	4	"Bourgie Sings the Blues"	Shelley Jensen	Tom Devanney	October 9, 1995	60104	14.7
129	5	"The Script Formerly Known As…"	Shelley Jensen	Felicia D. Henderson	October 16, 1995	60105	14.5
130	6	"Not, I Barbecue"	Madeline Cripe	Kandace Yvette Williams & Matt Tarses	October 23, 1995	60106	14.3
131	7	"Not with My Cousin You Don't"	Shelley Jensen	Adam Markowitz	November 6, 1995	60107	16.8
132	8	"Viva Lost Wages"	Shelley Jensen	Robert Bruce	November 13, 1995	60108	15.0
133	9	"There's the Rub"	Shelley Jensen	Joel Madison	November 20, 1995	60109	16.0
134	10	"There's the Rub"	Shelley Jensen	Joel Madison	November 20, 1995	60110	16.0
135	11	"I, Ooh, Baby Baby"	Alfonso Ribeiro	Tom Devanney & Adam Markowitz	December 11, 1995	60111	14.1
136	12	"Boxing Helena"	Shelley Jensen	Michael Soccio	January 8, 1996	60112	17.5
137	13	"I, Clownius"	Shelley Jensen	Story by : David Wyatt; Teleplay by : George Tricker	January 15, 1996	60115	14.8
138	14	"Breaking Up Is Hard to Do: Part 1"	Shelley Jensen	Lisa Rosenthal	February 12, 1996	60113	14.2
139	15	"Breaking Up Is Hard to Do: Part 2"	Shelley Jensen	Lisa Rosenthal	February 19, 1996	60114	12.9
140	16	"I, Bowl Buster"	Shelley Jensen	Michael Soccio	February 26, 1996	60117	14.6
141	17	"The Butler's Son Did It"	Madeline Cripe	Lisa Rosenthal	March 18, 1996	60116	14.0
142	18	"Hare Today…"	Shelley Jensen	Robert Bruce	April 8, 1996	60119	15.8
143	19	"I, Whoops, There It Is"	Shelley Jensen	Mary Beth Pemberton & Tanya Ward	April 15, 1996	60124	13.1
144	20	"I, Stank Horse"	Shelley Jensen	Tom Devanney	April 22, 1996	60120	13.1
145	21	"I, Stank Hole in One"	Werner Walian	Michael Soccio & Matt Tarses	May 6, 1996	60121	12.6
146	22	"Eye, Tooth"	Shelley Jensen	Adam Markowitz	May 13, 1996	60118	11.0
147	23	"I, Done"	Shelley Jensen	Jeff Pollack	May 20, 1996	60122	19.9
148	24	"I, Done"	Shelley Jensen	Jeff Pollack	May 20, 1996	60123	19.9
