= The Fresh Prince of Bel-Air season 4 =

Season of television series

The Fresh Prince of Bel-Air
- Season 4
- DVD cover
- No. of episodes: 26

Release
- Original network: NBC
- Original release: September 20, 1993 – May 23, 1994

Season chronology
- ← Previous; Season 3 Next → Season 5

The fourth season of The Fresh Prince of Bel-Air premiered on September 20, 1993 and concluded on May 23, 1994. This is the first season to feature Daphne Maxwell Reid as Vivian Banks after Janet Hubert-Whitten's departure. With 26 episodes, this is the longest season of The Fresh Prince of Bel-Air. Season 4 was originally meant to be the final season of the show, but NBC renewed the show for two more seasons.

== Episodes ==
- Will Smith, James Avery, Alfonso Ribeiro and Karyn Parsons were present for all episodes.
- Tatyana M. Ali and Joseph Marcell were absent for one episode each.
- Daphne Maxwell Reid was absent for three episodes.
- DJ Jazzy Jeff was present for twelve episodes.

No. overall	No. in season	Title	Directed by	Written by	Original release date	Prod. code	Viewers (millions)
74	1	"Where There's a Will, There's a Way"	Shelley Jensen	Gary H. Miller	September 20, 1993	60031	24.2
75	2	"Where There's a Will, There's a Way"	Shelley Jensen	Gary H. Miller	September 20, 1993	60032	24.2
Part 1: Will and Carlton begin their first year of college by moving into their own apartment, while Philip and Vivian enjoy their newborn son. Trevor plans to propose marriage to Hilary while bungee jumping on his TV news show. Will accuses Jazz of sending rappers to his party until Jackie (Tyra Banks) arrives to the party. Part 2: Will and Carlton are kicked out of their rooms by the landlord (Howard Mann)) due to Jazz' party scam. Trevor is met with a sudden death whilst proposing and Hilary has difficulty dealing with his death. She decides move back inside the house and into her old room, since all her memories about Trevor are in the pool house. Will and Carlton move into the pool house and they expect to pay the rent to Phil.
76	3	"All Guts, No Glory"	Shelley Jensen	Maiya Williams	September 27, 1993	60033	22.8
Will withdraws from a difficult college philosophy class, then regrets his decision when he discovers that the professor Jeremy Mansfield (Jim Meskimen) is the most stimulating teacher he has ever known. He chooses to return to that class even when having to forfeit the credits it should give him.
77	4	"Father of the Year"	Shelley Jensen	Leslie Ray & David Steven Simon	October 4, 1993	60034	21.8
When Will tries to impress a beautiful college girl by pretending to be a single father and using his new infant cousin as his son, he is forced to accept the honor of "Campus Father of the Year". Jackie (Tyra Banks) makes him feel ashamed and he confesses when offered a prize of plane tickets to Hawaii, so he hands them over to the other student-father, who then confides to Will that he also is lying. Uncle Phil talks to Will about lying pretending to be a single father and sits on him.
78	5	"It's Better to Have Loved and Lost It..."	Shelley Jensen	David Zuckerman	October 11, 1993	60036	22.2
Carlton meets Jo Ann (Natalie Venetia Belcon), a beautiful woman on the college campus. They end up spending the night together and Carlton finally loses his virginity. This also helps give him confidence as he prepares again to apply for Princeton. However, Carlton's shot at greater merriment is short-lived, as Jo Ann turns out to be married to Dean Morgan (Robert Hooks), a man who could've helped Carlton get into Princeton and reveals to Carlton that she was actually using him for a one-night stand. Meanwhile, the ethics committee is digging up dirt on every judge in town and Philip worries that the slightest indiscretion could cost him his Job. Geoffrey ends up panicking the most and shows the family his greatest shame, when he cheated in the 1976 Summer Olympics. However, the family just laughs it off.
79	6	"Will Goes a Courtin'"	Shelley Jensen	Bill Boulware	October 18, 1993	60037	21.3
Will defies his uncle by throwing a pool party in the yard after he makes his rent payment conditional that Philip repairs the air conditioner in the pool house, which Philip nonetheless demands in exchange for that freedom. The next day, Philip sues, unprepared for them to plead their cases in court before Judge Reynolds. Philip and Will/Carlton paint very different pictures before the judge, who rules in Philip's favor as A/C is not an essential housing requirement.
80	7	"Hex and the Single Guy"	Shelley Jensen	Barry Gurstein & David Pitlik	October 25, 1993	60038	20.3
When the Banks family attends a seance so Hilary can contact her dead ex-fiancé Trevor, Scorpius, the spiritualist (Glenn Shadix) gets so frustrated with Will's mockery and skepticism that he curses the family with a hex that brings them all bad luck: Uncle Phil is put out of business because of assumed evidence that he was taking bribes and faces jail time, Ashley breaks an ankle just before her tennis match, Carlton's hair gets bleached as a result of his Macaulay Culkin Halloween costume, Geoffrey gets deported, and Jazz and Hilary plan to get married. Will must convince the psychic to break the curse but when he returns, he realizes the man who cursed the Banks looks like a nerd, his real name is Ralph Scorpius, and he has none of what he had when he placed the curse. Will then wakes up from this dream but the day starts just like it did like an endless timeloop.
81	8	"Blood Is Thicker Than Mud"	Chuck Vinson	Devon Shepard	November 1, 1993	60039	22.2
Will and Carlton pledge Phi Beta Gamma, a black fraternity whose president Top Dog (Glenn Plummer) is a friend of Will's. They are given various chores as a form of hazing as part of their initiation, and Carlton is subjected to more difficult hazing (for instance bathing a full-grown St. Bernard, while Will and the other pledges groom Poodle Puppies) due to Top Dog's personal prejudice against Carlton and his wealthy family, since he equates being black with being working class and from the 'hood. Carlton accepts his hazing silently, earning the respect of many members, but Top Dog still denies membership to him while accepting Will. Carlton then tells him off for his prejudice and hypocrisy, Will leaves, and Top Dog's right-hand man kicks him out for his biased attitude. When Phil is told about what happened, he wonders how being wealthy, something he worked for, is equated to being hated by their own kind.
82	9	"Fresh Prince After Dark"	Shelley Jensen	Eddie Gorodetsky	November 8, 1993	60035	23.6
When Hilary is invited to pose for Playboy magazine, Will and Carlton get to meet Hugh Hefner and the beautiful bikini-clad "bunnies" at the Playboy mansion. Philip is furious and retreats to his self-styled hermitage. When he finally sees the publication, he at first seems pleasantly surprised that the pictures are tasteful as promised by Hugh, until he sees the centerfolds that are more revealing.
83	10	"Home Is Where the Heart Attack Is"	Shelley Jensen	Eddie Gorodetsky	November 15, 1993	60040	25.7
After struggling to lose weight, Philip has a serious heart attack while eating a cheeseburger that he bribes Will to buy for him. The entire family arrives at the hospital to help Philip get through this, except for Carlton. Will confronts Carlton to visit his father by telling the story of his own dead-beat father, reminding Carlton that he has a father who is there for his kids, and saying that he's just being selfish. Carlton eventually comes to comfort his father and reveals to him that he is just like Superman to him, and that he was frightened to watch his father suffer. Phillip, realizing how self-centered he had been acting as well, apologizes for letting him and his family down and pledges to take losing weight more seriously.
84	11	"Take My Cousin – Please"	Shelley Jensen	David Zuckerman	November 22, 1993	60041	20.3
When one of Will's college professors Scott Burton (Phil Morris) gets depressed over his recent divorce, Will hopes to improve his own failing class grade by introducing him to Hilary, who is still grieving Trevor's death. Since Will is on Academic Probation, passing Burton's class will get him off probation. They hit it off but then after a short time, Hilary starts not liking him for strange reasons such as his mole and Adam's Apple. Will finds that all of this is because she cannot get over Trevor. Despite her best efforts, Hilary is not able to get over Trevor. Will understands and accepts her justification. Meanwhile, Philip and Carlton attempt to build a high-tech crib for Nicky, "Le Crib Chalet", but find that they can't cooperate. When they successfully finish it, Ashley reveals that "Le Crib Chalet" was the most dangerous crib on the market, having flung a baby up 50 feet in the sky. Despite the crib being dangerous, Vivian commends Phil and Carlton on working together. After the credits, a "where-are-they-now"-style ending is shown: Will passes his midterm and is taken off academic probation, but is subsequently put back on two weeks later; Hilary started dating again, but has no memory of who she dated; Professor Burton is removed from the college when he starts dating a girl from Will's "chicktionary"; and Nicky is thrown from the crib into the sky at 42 feet.
85	12	"You've Got to Be a Football Hero"	Shelley Jensen	Bill Boulware	November 29, 1993	60042	25.1
When Will is challenged to a drinking contest by Jackie's boyfriend, Hank Farley (Cylk Cozart), a popular college football player, he gets drunk, collapses in a cemetery on the way home, and is trapped in a mausoleum with four philosophical ghosts. He learns how stupid it can be to get so drunk when he meets the ghost of a boy killed by a drunk driver.
86	13	"Twas the Night Before Christening"	Shelley Jensen	Maiya Williams & Eddie Gorodetsky	December 20, 1993	60043	22.3
Surprised by the expensive gifts that the Banks family bought for baby Nicky's christening on Christmas Eve, Will foolishly promises to provide a live performance by the R&B music group Boyz II Men. Vivian chooses Geoffrey ahead of her sisters as the child's godfather. Philip recounts this as a bedtime story to toddler Nicky in 1998, to which time this episode travels forward. This episode contradicts the latter timeline of the sitcom, as Geoffrey leaves for England and the Banks move out of the mansion in the final episode.
87	14	"Sleepless in Bel-Air"	Shelley Jensen	Maiya Williams	January 3, 1994	60054	22.6
Will and Carlton try to concentrate on their schoolwork while surrounded by the noisy late-night distractions of the Banks family. Carlton ends up irritating Will by revealing that the assignment he was working on was purely optional whereas Will's test will be mandatory. Ashley came home late by curfew and her father is very overbearing and overprotective of her. Ashley tried to reason with her father, it didn't work and he punished her for it.
88	15	"Who's the Boss"	Shelley Jensen	David Pitlik & Barry Gurstein	January 10, 1994	60044	23.4
When Carlton becomes the new manager of the campus restaurant, Will (who had previously been up for the same position) refuses to work as his employee. He attempts to do so, and when it does not work out, he gets a job at a sports bar a few blocks away.
89	16	"I Know Why the Caged Bird Screams"	Shelley Jensen	Bill Boulware & David Zuckerman	January 24, 1994	60045	22.9
When Carlton, the mascot of the university's football team, is abducted by the students from a rival college, Will wears Carlton's peacock costume to inspire the team during a championship game. It does not work because they are so attached to Carlton already and his inspiring speech puts even more of a damper on their team spirit.
90	17	"When You Hit Upon a Star"	Shelley Jensen	Michael Soccio	January 31, 1994	60046	23.5
Will's love affair with a superstar singer, Michelle Michaels (Stacey Dash), is threatened when he meets her handsome former lover. Will learns that glamorous flings are not as fulfilling as meaningful relationships.
91	18	"Stop Will! In the Name of Love"	Maynard C. Virgil I	Story by : Gayle Abrams; Teleplay by : Gayle Abrams & Jenji Kohan	February 14, 1994	60048	19.9
Ashley asks Will to chaperone her on a date, thinking that her father would be too overprotective. Will and Ashley double date, and he turns out to be just as overprotective. Both of their dates take off, as Will's "double standards" are apparent; Ashley subsequently rebels, wanting nothing to do with Will. When Will and Ashley arrive on a bad romantic dinner between Phil and Vivian, the parents get angry at Will's incompetence as a chaperone. Ashley, feeling her pleas have been completely ignored, finally gets through to them by singing "Respect", signaling to her parents that she is no longer a child.
92	19	"You'd Better Shop Around"	Shelley Jensen	Devon Shepard & K. Snyder	February 21, 1994	60047	19.7
Will withdraws from his university classes to become a successful car salesman by the place's owner Pete Fletcher (Robert Guillaume). His mother becomes furious when she finds out and comes to LA, and gets him to re-enroll at college by threatening to enroll herself.
93	20	"The Ol' Ball and Chain"	Shelley Jensen	Arnold Rudnick & Rich Hosek	February 28, 1994	60049	19.5
On the day of Jazz's wedding, his bride-to-be Jewel (Karen Malina White) makes sexual advances towards Will to call off the wedding.
94	21	"The Harder They Fall"	Shelley Jensen	Devon Shepard	March 14, 1994	60050	19.5
Will finds himself stranded in a mountain forest with his new girlfriend Lisa's (Cree Summer) disagreeable father Augustus (John Witherspoon), after having crash-landed. He escapes from there and leaves him to it because he is somewhat unsettled by his overbearing personality and protectiveness of Lisa.
95	22	"M is for the Many Things She Gave Me"	Shelley Jensen	Gary H. Miller	April 25, 1994	60060	17.6
When Philip's former college girlfriend, Janice Robertson (Pam Grier), visits the Banks family, she attempts to seduce an unwilling Will, who is supposed to be getting to know the daughter, Wendy (Elise Neal). Vivian is openly jealous of Janice's presence (made worse by overhearing Phil saying he "settled" for Vivian after Janice showed no interest), but when Philip finds out that Will slept with Janice, he apologizes to her and makes it clear that he values his marriage more than anything Janice tempts him with. She accepts his apology (but still has him sleep on the couch for his flirty behavior).
96	23	"Mother's Day"	Madeline Cripe	Leslie Ray & David Steven Simon	May 2, 1994	60051	15.1
When Jazz and his wife, Jewel, try unsuccessfully to conceive a child, they ask Will to "father" the baby. Meanwhile, Phillip challenges the kids to put more thought into their Mother's Day gifts for Vivian.
97	24	"Papa's Got a Brand New Excuse"	Shelley Jensen	Bill Boulware & David Zuckerman	May 9, 1994	60053	19.4
Will's deadbeat father, Lou Smith (Ben Vereen), returns to his son's life after 14 years. Will is very happy about the chance to reconnect with his father. However, Philip and Vivian (especially Philip) give him the cold shoulder, sensing that Lou has returned for his own selfish purposes and will most likely disappoint Will again. Will refuses to believe it and even gets into a heated argument with Philip. However, Lou discovers he has landed a new job that doesn't afford room to take Will on a cross-country trip he'd promised. Phillip berates Lou for prioritizing his own life over his son's, but Lou just doesn't realize how big of a mistake this is. When Lou tells Will, he rejects Lou and he leaves without another word. A heartbroken Will goes on a tirade about how Lou was never there when he needed him before breaking down in Philip's arms.
98	25	"For Sale by Owner"	Shelley Jensen	Harrison Boyd	May 16, 1994	60061	19.4
The Banks family is offered a $1 million profit by Donald Trump and Marla Maples, who wants to buy the family house. Clips are shown of previous memorable occasions. The only person who really does not want to move even for the money is Ashley, who shows the most sentimental attachment, a complete opposite to her brother Carlton who'd like to take the money and leave.
99	26	"The Philadelphia Story"	Shelley Jensen	Maiya Williams & Eddie Gorodetsky	May 23, 1994	60052	18.6
Will and the entire Banks family vacation in Will's hometown, Philadelphia, and learn a surprising secret about Will's reputation in the neighborhood. They learn that Will is now known as a chicken due to moving and not confronting the bully, Omar Boulware, who made him go to LA in the first place. Will is determined to fight Omar. Omar rejects him. Will is surprised and asks him about his reputation. Omar points at his small group of friends, telling Will that that was his reputation. Omar tells Will to grow up. Will stays behind with his mother. When Phil calls and asks Will when he was coming back to LA, Will said that he wasn't. A tagline shows an altered version of the Fresh Prince title, replacing "Bel-Air" with "Philadelphia?". Note: Will breaks the fourth wall by mentioning Omar as "the dude that be spinning me over his head in the opening credits".
