= For sale by owner (disambiguation) =

For sale by owner is the process of selling real estate without a broker or agent.

For sale by owner may also refer to:

- For Sale by Owner (film), 2009 horror film
- "For Sale By Owner", episode from the television series The Fresh Prince of Bel-Air
- Forsalebyowner.com, a real estate website

== See also ==
- "For Sail by Owner", episode from the television series Las Vegas
