= Where There's a Will There's a Way =

Where There's a Will There's a Way may refer to:

- "Where There's a Will, There's a Way", an episode of The Fresh Prince of Bel-Air season 4
- "Where There's a Will There's a Way" (song), a 1980 song by The Pop Group
