= Father Knows Last =

Father Knows Last may refer to:

In television:

- "Father Knows Last" (Cheers)
- "Father Knows Last" (Moonlighting)

In other uses:

- Father Knows Last: High Risk, Guilty Passion, an omnibus written by Jacqueline Baird and Emma Darcy

== See also ==
- Father Knows Best (disambiguation)
