= Father Knows Least =

Father Knows Least may refer to:

- "Father Knows Least" (Everybody Loves Raymond), the episode of Everybody Loves Raymond
- "Father Knows Least" (Dexter's Laboratory), the episode of Dexter's Laboratory

== See also ==
- Father Knows Best (disambiguation)
