= Father Knows Less =

Father Knows Less may refer to:

- "Father Knows Less" (Boy Meets World), an episode of Boy Meets World
- "Father Knows Less" (Parker Lewis Can't Lose), an episode of Parker Lewis Can't Lose

== See also ==
- Father Knows Best (disambiguation)
