= Father Knows Nothing =

Father Knows Nothing may refer to:

- "Father Knows Nothing" (Three's a Crowd), a 1985 television episode
- "Father Knows Nothing", an episode of The Good Guys (1968 TV series)
- Father Knows Nothing, a working title of The Parent 'Hood

== See also ==
- Father Knows Best (disambiguation)
