= The Little Rascals (film) =

1994 family comedy film by Penelope Spheeris

- Theatrical release poster
- Directed by: Penelope Spheeris
- Screenplay by: Paul Guay; Stephen Mazur; Penelope Spheeris
- Story by: Paul Guay; Stephen Mazur; Penelope Spheeris; Mike Scott; Robert Wolterstorff
- Based on: Our Gang by Hal Roach
- Produced by: Bill Oakes; Michael King; Gerald R. Molen
- Starring: Travis Tedford; Kevin Jamal Woods; Jordan Warkol; Zachary Mabry; Ross Elliot Bagley; Courtland Mead; Sam Saletta; Blake Jeremy Collins; Blake McIver Ewing; Juliette Brewer; Heather Karasek; Brittany Ashton Holmes; Bug Hall; Elmer; Petey
- Cinematography: Richard Bowen
- Edited by: Ross Albert; Peter Teschner
- Music by: William Ross
- Production companies: Universal Pictures; Amblin Entertainment; KingWorld Filmed Entertainment
- Distributed by: Universal Pictures
- Release date: August 5, 1994
- Running time: 82 minutes
- Country: United States
- Language: English
- Box office: $67.3 million

The Little Rascals is a 1994 American family comedy film produced by Amblin Entertainment, and released by Universal Pictures on August 5, 1994. The film is an adaptation of Hal Roach's Our Gang, a series of short films of the 1920s, 1930s, and 1940s (many of which were broadcast on television as The Little Rascals) which centered on the adventures of a group of neighborhood children. Directed by Penelope Spheeris, who co-wrote the screenplay with Paul Guay and Stephen Mazur, the film presents several of the Our Gang characters in an updated setting, featuring re-interpretations of several of the original shorts. It is the first collaboration by Guay and Mazur, whose subsequent comedies were Liar Liar and Heartbreakers.

The Little Rascals was released by Universal Pictures on August 5, 1994. The film received mixed reviews from critics and grossed $67.3 million. A sequel, The Little Rascals Save the Day, also based on Our Gang, was released as a direct-to-video feature in 2014.

== Plot ==
Spanky McFarland is the president of the "He-Man Womun [sic] Haters Club" with many school-aged boys from around the neighborhood as members. His best friend, Alfalfa, has been chosen as the driver for the club's prize-winning undefeated go-kart, "The Blur", in the annual Soap Box Derby style race. However, when the announcement is made, Alfalfa is nowhere to be found.

The boys catch Alfalfa in the company of Darla. The club's members try their hardest to break the two apart, eventually causing their beloved clubhouse to burn down. Darla is mistakenly led to believe Alfalfa feels ashamed of her, so she turns her attention to Waldo, the new rich kid whose family just moved into town after his father, an oil tycoon, bought the oil refinery. Spanky, Stymie and friends judge Alfalfa's punishment to be left guarding the go-kart around the clock until the day of the race (in addition, he is also forbidden from ever having any contact with Darla). Until that day comes, Alfalfa makes many attempts to woo back Darla including a visit to her ballet rehearsal, an undelivered love letter, and through serenade, all of which fail.

In order to rebuild their clubhouse, the boys try to fund-raise the cost of lumber, $450, but the youngest ones, Porky and Buckwheat, have unwittingly come up with $500. Their school teacher, Miss Crabtree, finds out about the scheme, but Spanky convinces her to use the funds as prize money for the go-kart derby. Later that day, Alfalfa and Spanky get into a heated argument when Alfalfa finds out that Spanky is the reason for his breakup with Darla which causes Alfalfa to quit as a club member.

"The Blur" is stolen by local bullies Butch and Woim. In addition to having to rebuild the clubhouse, the boys now need a new soapbox racer. They band together to build "The Blur 2: The Sequel." Prior to race day, Spanky and Alfalfa reconcile and decide to ride in the two-seat go-kart together. They hope to win the prize money and the trophy, to be presented to the victors by "the greatest racer of all, A.J. Ferguson."

Butch and Woim make several sneaky attempts to stop Alfalfa and Spanky from winning the race. Waldo, who (seemingly) kicks out Darla from his race car, pulls a few tricks of his own. "The Blur 2" crosses the finish line ahead of the pack (and resulting in a photo-finish between "The Blur" and "The Blur 2" literally "by a hair" due to Alfalfa's cowlick), despite the many scrapes and crashes throughout the derby. When Butch and Woim try to fight with Alfalfa, he knocks Butch into pig slop, with Woim throwing himself in.

Along with first prize, Alfalfa also wins back Darla's heart after it turns out that Darla kicked Waldo out of the car instead of the opposite. Spanky, meanwhile, is shocked at the trophy presentation when he finally meets his favorite driver, A.J. Ferguson, whom he learns is a woman. Spanky also confesses to Darla that he was responsible for messing up her and Alfalfa's picnic, as he feared that she was trying to steal his best friend and sabotage their club, realizing he was wrong and apologizes to both Alfalfa and Darla. As soon as the club house is rebuilt, the boys collectively have a change of heart toward membership and welcome Darla and friends to their club, with "Women Welcome" added to the sign.

At the end of the movie, it is revealed that Uh-Huh can say more than simply "Uh-Huh." The movie closes with bloopers from the kids while filming.

== Cast ==
- Travis Tedford as "Spanky" McFarland, the president of "He-Man Womun Hater's Club" and Alfalfa's best friend.
- Bug Hall as "Alfalfa" Switzer, Spanky's best friend and Darla's boyfriend.
- Brittany Ashton Holmes as Darla, Alfalfa's girlfriend.
- Kevin Jamal Woods as "Stymie", the club's vice-president.
- Jordan Warkol (voice dubbed by E. G. Daily) as "Froggy", a club member with a croaking voice and a huge love for amphibians.
- Zachary Mabry as "Porky", one of the younger members of the club and Buckwheat's best friend.
- Ross Elliot Bagley as "Buckwheat", another one of the younger members of the club and Porky's best friend.
- Courtland Mead as "Uh-huh" – club "typographer", always answers "uh-huh".
- Sam Saletta as "Butch", the neighborhood bully.
- Blake Jeremy Collins as "Woim", Butch's best friend and sidekick.
- Blake McIver Ewing as Waldo Johnston III, an obnoxious rich new kid who is very interested in Darla.
- Juliette Brewer as Mary Ann.
- Heather Karasek as Jane.
- Raven-Symoné as Stymie's girlfriend at the club.
- Mary-Kate and Ashley Olsen as the twins at Darla's sleepover.
- Mel Brooks as Mr. Welling, the stingy bank teller.
- Lea Thompson as Miss Roberts, Darla's ballet instructor.
- Daryl Hannah as Miss Crabtree, the gang's schoolteacher.
- Reba McEntire as A.J. Ferguson, "the best driver there is".
- Whoopi Goldberg as Buckwheat's mother.
- Donald Trump as Waldo Johnston II, Waldo's father.
- Eric Edwards as Spanky's father.
- Dan Carton as Alfalfa's father.
- George Wendt as Lumber store guy.
- Alexandra Monroe King as Darla's friend at Darla's sleepover.
- Zoe Oakes as Darla's other friend at Darla's sleepover.
- Katie Volding as Uh-huh's girlfriend at the club. (uncredited)

=== Animals ===
- Petey, an American Bulldog.
- Fifi, a Doberman Pinscher.
- Elmer, a white-throated white Capuchin monkey and part of the Rascal's club.

== Production ==
Bill Thomas Jr., son of the late Billie "Buckwheat" Thomas, contacted the studio and was invited down to visit the set, but got the impression that the filmmakers did not want him or any of the surviving original cast members involved in any production capacity. The surviving cast members saw this as especially hurtful, in light of the fact that director Penelope Spheeris had previously made a point of including Buddy Ebsen, from the original Beverly Hillbillies, in her 1993 feature film adaptation of that series. Eugene Jackson, who played the original Pineapple from the silent Our Gang comedies, tried unsuccessfully to contact the studio to be a part of production, stated, "It's real cold. They have no respect for the old-timers. At least they could have recognized some of the living legends surviving from the first films." Filming took place from January 11, 1994 to April 6, 1994.

An extended cut of the film has occasionally been shown with television airings. The cut extends the film by over four minutes.

== Release ==
=== Critical response ===
On Rotten Tomatoes the film has an approval rating of 31% based on reviews from 16 critics as of September 2026. On Metacritic it has a score of 45 out of 100 based on reviews from 20 critics, indicating "mixed or average reviews". Audiences surveyed by CinemaScore gave the film a grade "A−" on scale of A to F.

Brian Lowry of Variety magazine wrote: "Those who grew up watching The Little Rascals may well be intrigued by the idea of introducing their kids to this full-color, bigscreen version. Still, the challenge of stretching those mildly diverting shorts to feature length remains formidable, and one has to wonder whether an audience exists beyond nostalgic parents and their young children." Writing in The Washington Post, critic Desson Howe described the film as "a see-through marketing impulse more than a creative venture" with "gratuitous grown-up cameos," and concluded that "if one thing unites parents as one, makes them stand up and cheer, it's likely to be that familiar on-screen credit: The End." Film critic Glenn Kenny reported in Entertainment Weekly that the film was "not half bad" and "a minor delight," that it "can be seen as another of the director’s love/hate letters to L.A.," and suggested that "[Spheeris'] experience with the half-formed humans in [her] Decline movies may have provided the forbearance to deal with her preteen actors."

=== Box office ===
The Little Rascals earned $10 million at the North American box office during its opening weekend, ranking in fourth place behind Clear and Present Danger, The Mask and Forrest Gump. The film grossed a worldwide total of $67,308,282.

== Home media ==
The Little Rascals was released on VHS, DVD, and Blu-ray in 1995, 2004, and 2014 respectively.

== See also ==
- Our Gang
- The Little Rascals (animated TV series)
- The Little Rascals Save the Day (2014 film)
