= Lush Life (TV series) =

1996 American sitcom

- Created by: Yvette Lee Bowser; Lori Petty; Karyn Parsons
- Starring: Karyn Parsons; Lori Petty; Fab Filippo; Khalil Kain; John Ortiz; Sullivan Walker
- Opening theme: "We're Livin' The Lush Life" Performed by Terence Trent D'Arby
- Country of origin: United States
- Original language: English
- No. of seasons: 1
- No. of episodes: 7 (3 unaired)

Production
- Executive producer: Yvette Lee Bowser
- Camera setup: Multi-camera
- Running time: 22 minutes
- Production companies: SisterLee Productions; Warner Bros. Television

Original release
- Network: Fox
- Release: September 9 – November 18, 1996

Lush Life is an American television sitcom that aired between September and November 1996 on Fox. The series stars Karyn Parsons and Lori Petty as roommates who share a studio apartment for financial reasons.

== Plot ==
Petty stars as Georgette "George" Sanders, a wild, uninhibited bohemian artist. Parsons plays Margot Hines, a snooty, airheaded wanna-be businesswoman. The two get into conflicts generally surrounding one of their crazy schemes. In one aired episode, George fakes her own death to draw attention and higher prices to her paintings. In another, Margot convinces some of George's gay male friends to pose as her boyfriends to frighten off her ex-husband.

== Cancellation ==
The ratings of the first episode were low, and it was canceled after the fourth episode aired at the end of September 1996. It was the first new series of 1996 to be canceled. The remaining three produced episodes were aired later in October and November.

== Cast ==
=== Main cast ===
- Karyn Parsons as Margot Hines
- Lori Petty as Georgette "George" Sanders
- Fab Filippo as Hamilton Ford Foster
- Khalil Kain as Lance Battista
- John Ortiz as Nelson "Margarita" Marquez
- Sullivan Walker as Hal Gardner

=== Recurring cast ===
- Concetta Tomei as Ann Hines-Davis-Wilson-Jefferson-Ali
- Derek Chen as Joey White

== Episodes ==
No.	Title	Directed by	Written by	Original release date	Prod. code
1	"The Lush Beginning"	Ellen Gittelsohn	Yvette Lee Bowser & Lori Petty & Karyn Parsons	September 9, 1996	475106
Margot Hines, a snooty socialite coming off a tumultuous marriage with her cheating ex-husband, moves in with her childhood best friend Georgette "George" Sanders, a free-spirited abstract artist. They plot to get Margot's belongings from her ex's house, then run into her ex-husband latest flame, Sandy (Mari Morrow).
2	"The Dead Lush Artist"	Ellen Gittelsohn	Lyn Greene & Richard Levine	September 16, 1996	465502
Margot convinces George that her paintings would be worth a lot more if people think that she is dead. The plan actually works to the point that a gallery auction is arranged, showing off George's work.
3	"The First Lush Date"	Ellen Gittelsohn	Matt Ember	September 23, 1996	465503
George convinces Margot to get back into the dating life.
4	"The Lush Ex-Posures"	Ellen Gittelsohn	Eunetta T. Boone	September 30, 1996	465504
Wallace (Phil Morris), Margot's cheating airline pilot ex-husband, is now dating an up-and-coming politician and tries to retrieve naked photos from Margot from when they were married.
5	"The Lush Waitress"	Ellen Gittelsohn	Marc Hyman	October 28, 1996	465501
6	"The Lush Hex"	Ellen Gittelsohn	Marc Hyman	November 4, 1996	465505
7	"The Not So Lush Rock Star"	Ellen Gittelsohn	Matt Ember & Lynnie Greene & Richard Levine & Marc Hyman	November 18, 1996	465506
