= Mother Knows Best =

Mother Knows Best may refer to:

== Film and television ==
- Mother Knows Best (film) Fox's first "talkie" (1928)
- "Mother Knows Best" (Class of the Titans) an episode from season one of Canadian animated television series Class of the Titans
- Mother Knows Best (1997 TV movie) by Larry Shaw starring Joanna Kerns, Christine Elise and Grant Show

== Literature ==
- Mother Knows Best, a novel by Serena Valentino

== Music ==
- "Mother Knows Best" (song), performed by Donna Murphy, on the soundtrack of the Disney film Tangled
- "Mother Knows Best", song by Richard Thompson from the album Rumor and Sigh 1991
- "Mother Knows Best", song by Crystal Castles from the album Doe Deer 2007

== See also ==
- Father Knows Best (disambiguation)
