= Rich Hosek =

American TV writer, novelist (active 1990– )

Rich Hosek is a television writer and novelist whose screen credits include Star Trek: Voyager, Hope and Gloria, Pacific Blue, The New Addams Family, and The Fresh Prince of Bel-Air. He received a Leo Award for his work on The New Addams Family. His writing credits are all with writing partner Arnold Rudnick. He started working in television in 1990 as a production assistant, later a writers assistant, on the series A Different World.

His novels include books in the Raney/Daye Investigation series, co-written with Arnold Rudnick and Loyd Auerbach:

Near Death (2020)

After Life (2021)

And a series of "everyman thrillers" From the Files of Eddie Horne:

The Dead Kids Club (2021)

The Tenth Ride (2021)

He attended the University of Illinois Urbana-Champaign campus where he majored in Computer Engineering. While there, he was a chimes player at Altgeld Hall. He now works in information technology.
