= Janet Hubert =

American film and television actress

- Born: Janet Louise Hubert; January 13, 1956 (age 70); Chicago, Illinois, U.S.
- Education: Juilliard School
- Occupation: Actress/Dancer
- Years active: 1980–present
- Spouses: James Whitten (m. 1990–1994) Larry Kraft (m. 2005)
- Children: 1

Janet Louise Hubert (born January 13, 1956) is an American film and television actress and dancer. She is best known for playing the role of the original Vivian Banks on the sitcom The Fresh Prince of Bel-Air from its first season in 1990 until the end of its third season in 1993. Hubert was nominated for an NAACP Image Award for Outstanding Actress in a Comedy Series for her role in 1991. Her performance as Mignon on the digital series King Ester garnered her first Daytime Emmy Award nomination in 2020.

== Early life ==
Hubert was born in Chicago, Illinois and spent her early days growing up on Chicago's South Side. At the age of nine she moved with her family to rural Illinois. She won a scholarship to the Juilliard School in New York City, but did not complete her studies.

== Career ==
After performing in the national tour of Dancin', Hubert made her Broadway debut in 1981, in the ensemble of The First, a short-lived musical about Jackie Robinson. Hubert created the role of Tantomile in the original Broadway production of Cats, and also understudied Grizabella and Demeter. She left Cats in April 1983 to star in the national tour of Sophisticated Ladies, opposite Dee Dee Bridgewater and Gregg Burge. Hubert played Aunt Viv on The Fresh Prince of Bel-Air, the role she is most known for. After she was allegedly fired by the makers of The Fresh Prince, Hubert's character was recast and played by Daphne Maxwell Reid for the remainder of the show's run. At the time, Will Smith, the show's star, claimed that Hubert "brought her problems to work." Rumors then speculated that Smith had fired her following her departure. Hubert has since denied this, explaining that she had left the show after being informed that she had 2 1/2 months of remaining on set and that she could not work on another project.

Hubert was featured in a 2002 episode of Friends as Chandler's boss. In 2005, she began playing the recurring role of Lisa Williamson, mother of attorney Evangeline Williamson, on One Life to Live. Her character has made occasional appearances since then. She was featured as Michel Gerard's mother in an episode of the CW show Gilmore Girls. She has made appearances on episodes of All My Children, NYPD Blue, The Bernie Mac Show, and Tyler Perry's House of Payne, among others. In November 2018, it was announced that Hubert had been cast on the daytime soap opera, General Hospital; she made her debut as Yvonne on December 7, 2018.

Hubert appeared in The Fresh Prince of Bel-Air Reunion on HBO Max in November 2020. During the special, she and Smith spoke for the first time since her departure from the show. Hubert discussed issues regarding her personal life, which included domestic violence, and revealed she had not been fired from the show as largely believed. Smith admitted that he was neither "sensitive" nor "perceptive" to Hubert's situation and attributed his behavior to being "very young" and "immature" at the time. He has insisted that being a parent has taught him how to understand what she was dealing with and apologized for his actions. Hubert then joined the rest of the guests at the reunion.

Hubert appeared on FX's Pose in season 3 as a family member of Billy Porter's character, Pray Tell, alongside Jackée Harry and Anna Maria Horsford. In 2022, she appeared on The Ms. Pat Show as the title character's mother-in-law, Jewell.

== Personal life ==
Hubert suffers from osteoporosis and is the ambassador of the National Osteoporosis Foundation.

== Filmography ==
=== Film ===
Year	Title	Role	Notes
1985	Agent on Ice	Lola	
1994	New Eden	Ashtarte	TV movie
1995	White Man's Burden	Dinner Guest	
1999	California Myth	Lysistrata	
2001	30 Years to Life	Joy's Mom	
2004	Proud	Larry's Mother	
2004	Christmas at Water's Edge	Mrs. Turner	TV movie
2004	Neurotica	The Neighbor	
2013	Mom	Judy Curtains	
2015	No Letting Go	Dr. Stacey Slater	
2016	Not Another Black Movie	Aunt Gloria	
2019	Christmas Belles	Whitley	TV movie
2020	JG and the BC Kids	Narrator/Blackbird/Stanley Leroy	Also screenplay writer
2022	Single Black Female	Denise	TV movie
2022	Fever	Grace	Short
2022	Remember Me: The Mahalia Jackson Story	Aunt Duke	
2023	The Perfect Find	Monica	
2024	Snatched	Carolyn	

=== Television ===
Year	Title	Role	Notes
1988	Hunter	Vanessa Riley	Episode: "The Fourth Man"
1988	21 Jump Street	Councilwoman Travers	Episode: "Fun with Animals"
1989	Hooperman	Loretta Todd	Episode: "Look Homeward, Dirtbag"
1989	A Man Called Hawk	Serita	Episode: "Poison"
1989	One Life to Live	Miriam	Episode: "Episode #1.5370"
1990	Tales from the Crypt	Psyche	Episode: "Till Death"
1990–1993	The Fresh Prince of Bel-Air	Vivian Banks	Main role
1992	Where in the World Is Carmen Sandiego?	Herself	Episode: "She Took the Notes Right of My Mouth"
1992–1993	Reasonable Doubts	Judge Mary Sims	Recurring role
1993	An Evening at the Improv	Herself/Host	Episode: "Janet Hubert, Glenn Super, Mary Anne Kelly, and more!"
1994	Dave's World	Elise	Episode: "Shel in Love"
1994	Coach	Karen Williams	Episode: "Blue Chip Blues"
1995	CBS Schoolbreak Special	Elaine Baham	Episode: "What About Your Friends"
1996	The Faculty	Annette Freeman	Episode: "Somewhere There's Music"
1996	The Pretender	Madam Director	Episode: "The Paper Clock"
1997	The Jamie Foxx Show	Edwina DuBois	Episode: "Act Like You Love Me"
1997	Goode Behavior	Dr. Pamela Fordham	Episode: "Goode Lovin'"
1997	Lawless	Esther Hayes	Episode: "Pilot"
1998	NYPD Blue	Hiruut Kebede	Episode: "Weaver of Hate"
1999	All My Children	Alice Dawson	Episode: "May 20, 1999"
2001–2002	The Job	Adina Phillips	Recurring role
2002	Weakest Link	Herself	Episode: "TV Moms Edition"
2002	Gilmore Girls	Gisele Gerard	Episode: "Back in the Saddle Again"
2002	Friends	Ms. McKenna	Episode: "The One Where Emma Cries"
2003–2004	The Bernie Mac Show	Leora	Guest
2005–2010	One Life to Live	Lisa Williamson	Main role
2007	E! True Hollywood Story	Herself	Episode: "Will Smith"
2010	Life After	Herself	Episode: "Janet Hubert"
2011	Tyler Perry's House of Payne	Evelyn	Episode: "A Mother's Payne"
2016–2017	If Loving You Is Wrong	Diane	Recurring role
2018–2020	General Hospital	Yvonne Godfrey	Main role
2020	54 Below Premieres	Herself	Episode: "Norm Lewis: Christmastime Is Here!"
2021	Pose	Latrice	Episode: "Take Me to Church"
2021	Love Life	Donna Watkins	Recurring role
2021	The Last O.G.	Miss May Miller	Recurring role
2022	New Amsterdam	Dr. Palpa	Episode: "Two Doors"
2022–2024	The Ms. Pat Show	Jewell Carson	Guest: season 2, recurring: season 4
2023	Sweet Magnolias	Bev Decatur	Episode: "Someone I'm Longing to See"
2023	My Dad the Bounty Hunter	Empress Gurira (voice)	Recurring role
2025	Demascus	Dr. Bonneville	Main Role
2025	Bel-Air	Iris	Episode: "Soulmates"

=== Music videos ===
Year	Artist	Song	Role
1986	Sylvester	"Someone Like You"	Dancer

=== Stage ===
Year(s)	Title	Role(s)	Notes
1980	Dancin'	Performer	
1981	The First	Passenger/Opal/fan	
1982	Cats	Tantomile	
1983	Sophisticated Ladies	Performer	
1984	Sleeping Beauty	Carameen	
2002	Crowns	Wanda	

=== Video games ===
Year	Title	Role	Notes
2013	Grand Theft Auto V	Denise Clinton	

== Awards ==
Year	Nominee/work	Award	Category	Result
1991	The Fresh Prince of Bel-Air	NAACP Image Awards	Outstanding Actress in a Comedy Series	Nominated
2014	Grand Theft Auto V	Behind the Voice Actors Award	Best Vocal Ensemble in a Video Game	Nominated
2020	King Ester	Daytime Emmy Awards	Outstanding Performance by a Supporting Actress in a Digital Drama Series	Nominated
