= Ross Bagley =

American actor and comedian

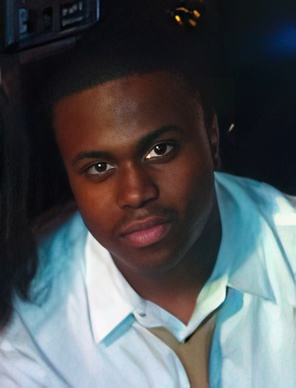
- Bagley in 2012
- Born: Ross Bagley
- Education: California State University, Northridge
- Occupations: Actor; comedian
- Years active: 1994–2015
- Notable work: The Little Rascals; Fresh Prince of Bel-Air

Ross Bagley is an American former actor and comedian. He is best known for his role as Nicholas "Nicky" Banks on The Fresh Prince of Bel-Air as well as Dylan Dubrow in Independence Day. He also played Buckwheat in The Little Rascals (1994).

== Career ==
Most popular as a child actor during the mid-1990s, Bagley is best known for his role as Nicholas "Nicky" Banks on the NBC sitcom The Fresh Prince of Bel-Air, between 1994 and 1996.

Bagley also portrayed Buckwheat in the feature film adaptation of 1994 of The Little Rascals, and along with his Fresh Prince co star Will Smith he appeared in the film Independence Day (1996). Just months after The Fresh Prince of Bel-Air ended, he appeared on the Children's Tylenol commercial.

== Filmography ==
Year	Title	Role	Notes
1994	The Little Rascals	Buckwheat	
1994–1996	The Fresh Prince of Bel-Air	Nicholas "Nicky" Banks	Television (48 episodes)
1995	Babe	Puppy	(voice)
1996	Eye for an Eye	Sean Kosinsky	
1996	Independence Day	Dylan Dubrow	
1996	Profiler	Donny	Television, one episode
1999	Providence	Eldon	Television, one episode
1999	The Wild Thornberrys	Hutu	Television, one episode (voice)
2004	Judging Amy	Micah Benton	Television, one episode
2015	Gnome Alone	Landon	

== Awards and nominations ==
Year	Film or series	Awards	Outcome	Recipient(s)
Young Artist Awards:
1995	The Little Rascals	Best Performance by a Youth Ensemble in a Motion Picture	Won	List: Ross Bagley Travis Tedford Bug Hall Brittany Ashton Holmes Kevin Jamal Woods Juliette Brewer
1995	The Fresh Prince of Bel-Air	Best Performance by an Actor Under Ten in a TV Series	Won	Ross Bagley
1996	The Fresh Prince of Bel-Air	Best Performance by an Actor Under Ten – Television	Won	Ross Bagley
1997	Independence Day	Best Performance in a Feature Film – Actor Age Ten or Under	Nominated	Ross Bagley
