= Father Knows Best (disambiguation) =

Father Knows Best is an American radio and television sitcom.

Father Knows Best may also refer to:

- Father Knows Best, an anthology of three novels by Judith Arnold: Father Found, Father Christmas, and Father of Two

== Television episodes ==
- "Father Knows Best" (Dexter), 2006
- "Father Knows Best" (Fresh Prince of Bel-Air), 1994
- "Father Knows Best" (The Bernie Mac Show),
- "Father Knows Best???" (Perfect Strangers), a two-part episode of Perfect Strangers
- "Father Knows Best", an episode of Tyler Perry's House of Payne
- "Father Knows Best", an episode of Gideon's Crossing
- "Father Knows Best", an episode of The Tortellis
- "Father Knows Best", an episode of High Incident
- "Father Knows Best", an episode of Eight is Enough
- "Father Knows Best", an episode of Pretty Little Liars
- "Father Knows Best, Even When He's a Ghost", an episode of Ghostly Encounters
- "The Father Knows Best", the alternative title of The O.C. episode "The Test"

== See also ==
- Father Does Know Best: The Lauren Chapin Story by Lauren Chapin and Andrew Collins
- "Father Knows Beast", an episode of Ghostbusters (1986 TV series)
- "Father Knows Death", an episode of The War Next Door
- "Father Knows Worst", an episode of The Simpsons
- Father Knows..., the film directed by Toby Ross
- Mother Knows Best (disambiguation)
