= The Fresh Prince of Bel-Air =

American television sitcom (1990–1996)

- Genre: Family sitcom; Comedy-drama
- Created by: Andy Borowitz; Susan Borowitz
- Based on: A format by Benny Medina & Jeff Pollack
- Starring: Will Smith; James Avery; Janet Hubert-Whitten; Alfonso Ribeiro; Karyn Parsons; Tatyana M. Ali; Joseph Marcell; Daphne Maxwell Reid; Ross Bagley
- Theme music composer: The Fresh Prince in association with A Touch of Jazz, Inc.
- Opening theme: "The Fresh Prince of Bel-Air" performed by DJ Jazzy Jeff & the Fresh Prince
- Ending theme: "The Fresh Prince of Bel-Air” (instrumental)
- Composer: Quincy Jones III
- Country of origin: United States
- Original language: English
- No. of seasons: 6
- No. of episodes: 148 (list of episodes)

Production
- Executive producers: Quincy Jones; David Salzman; Andy Borowitz; Susan Borowitz; Kevin Wendle (season 1); Jeff Pollack; Benny Medina; Winifred Hervey (seasons 2–3); Gary H. Miller (seasons 4–5); Cheryl Gard (season 5); Will Smith (season 4-6)
- Producers: Werner Walian; Lisa Rosenthal; Joel Madison; Leilani Downer; Joanne Curley-Kerner; Joel Markowitz
- Production locations: Hollywood Center Studios, Hollywood (1990–1991); Sunset Gower Studios, Hollywood (1991–1993); NBC Studios, Burbank (1993–1996)
- Camera setup: Videotape; Multi-camera
- Running time: 21–23 minutes
- Production companies: The Stuffed Dog Company; Quincy Jones Entertainment (1990–1993, seasons 1–3); Quincy Jones-David Salzman Entertainment (1993–1996, seasons 4–6); NBC Productions

Original release
- Network: NBC
- Release: September 10, 1990 – May 20, 1996

The Fresh Prince of Bel-Air is an American television sitcom created by Andy and Susan Borowitz that aired on NBC from September 10, 1990, to May 20, 1996. The series stars Will Smith as a fictionalized version of himself, a street-smart teenager born and raised in West Philadelphia who is sent to live with his wealthy uncle and aunt in Bel-Air, Los Angeles, where his lifestyle often clashes with that of his upper-class relatives.

The Fresh Prince of Bel-Air was a massive commercial success and a hit for NBC, running for 148 episodes over six seasons. Smith and James Avery were the only actors who appeared in every single episode. The series was Smith's star vehicle into television and film. The series is widely regarded as one of the greatest sitcoms of all time.

A reunion special/retrospective reuniting the surviving cast debuted on HBO Max in November 2020. A more dramatic re-imagining of the series, titled Bel-Air and based on the fan film of the same name, received a two-season order for Peacock, was released on February 13, 2022, and ran for four seasons.

== Summary ==
The theme song and opening sequence set the premise of the show. Will Smith is a street-smart African-American teenager, "born and raised" in West Philadelphia. While playing street basketball, Will accidentally hits a group of young people with the ball, causing a confrontation that frightens his mother, who sends him to live with his wealthy aunt and uncle in the opulent neighborhood of Bel Air.

Will's working class background ends up contrasting with the upper class world of the Banks family – Including his uncle Phil, aunt Vivian, and their children, Hilary, Carlton, Ashley and Nicky (introduced in season 3), including their butler, Geoffrey.

== Cast and characters ==
= Main cast (credited)
= Recurring cast (4+)

=== Main ===
Actor	Character						
Actor	Character	1	2	3	4	5	6
Will Smith	William "Will" Smith	Main	Main	Main	Main	Main	Main
James Avery	Philip Banks	Main	Main	Main	Main	Main	Main
Janet Hubert-Whitten	Vivian Banks	Main	Main	Main			
Daphne Maxwell Reid	Vivian Banks				Main	Main	Main
Alfonso Ribeiro	Carlton Banks	Main	Main	Main	Main	Main	Main
Karyn Parsons	Hilary Banks	Main	Main	Main	Main	Main	Main
Tatyana M. Ali	Ashley Banks	Main	Main	Main	Main	Main	Main
Joseph Marcell	Geoffrey Butler	Main	Main	Main	Main	Main	Main
Ross Bagley (Note: Various actors portrayed the infant Nicky Banks throughout seasons 3 and 4.)	Nicholas "Nicky" Banks			Recurring	Recurring	Main	Main

=== Recurring ===
Actor	Character	Seasons					
Actor	Character	1	2	3	4	5	6
DJ Jazzy Jeff	Jefferson "Jazz" Jefford	Recurring	Recurring	Recurring	Recurring	Recurring	Recurring
Vernee Watson-Johnson (Note: A different unidentified actress portrayed Will's mother in the opening title sequence.)	Viola "Vy" Smith	Recurring	Recurring	Recurring	Recurring	Recurring	Recurring
Michael Weiner	Kellogg "Cornflake" Lieberbaum	Recurring	Recurring				
Lisa Fuller	Toni	Recurring					
Virginia Capers	Hattie Banks	Recurring	Recurring				Recurring
Jenifer Lewis	Helen Smith		Recurring	Recurring	Recurring		Recurring
Charlayne Woodard	Janice Smith		Recurring	Recurring			
Perry Moore	Tyriq "Ty" Johnson		Recurring				
Brian Stokes Mitchell	Trevor Collins-Newsworthy			Recurring			
Tyra Banks	Jacqueline "Jackie" Ames				Recurring		
Nia Long (Note: Nia Long had a one-off role as Will's talkative prom date Claudia in season 2 before playing Lisa in season 5.)	Beullah "Lisa" Wilkes					Recurring	
Jim Meskimen (Note: Jim Meskimen had a one-off role as Professor Jeremy Mansfield in season 4 before returning as Werner in season 6.)	Werner						Recurring

=== Celebrity guest stars ===
The show is notable for having a heavy celebrity guest presence, with more than forty celebrities guest-starring throughout the series. Seasons 1 and 6 had the highest celebrity participation, with over 10 celebrity guest stars each.

Celebrity	Season–Episode	Notes	Ref(s)
Richard Roundtree	1–3	Dr. Mumford, father of Will's love interest. Also played Rev. Sims in 6–18.	
Don Cheadle	1–5	Ice Tray: Will's best friend from Philadelphia.	
Adrienne-Joi Johnson	1–7	Christina Johnson: Will's crush from poetry club.	
Bo Jackson	1–9	Themselves.	
Heavy D	1–9	Themselves.	
Malcolm-Jamal Warner	1–9	Themselves.	
Quincy Jones	1–9	Themselves.	
Al B. Sure!	1–9	Themselves.	
Kadeem Hardison	1–9	Themselves.	
Naomi Campbell	1–10	Helen: Geoffrey's date.	
Isiah Thomas	1–11	Himself.	
Evander Holyfield	1–15	Himself.	
Vivica A. Fox	1–19	Janet: Jazz's sister and Will's date.	
Jasmine Guy	1–21	Kayla Samuels: Will's girlfriend.	
Tevin Campbell	1–24	Little T: Teen idol.	
Queen Latifah	1–25	Marissa Redman: Hilary's Boss. Also played "Dee Dee" in 2–8.	
Tisha Campbell	2–1	Kathleen, Will's girlfriend in the episode.	
Lela Rochon	2–3	Cindy: Will's girlfriend in the episode.	
Malcolm-Jamal Warner	2–9	Eric: Hilary's love interest.	
Zsa Zsa Gabor	2–10	Sonya Lamor: Uncle Phil's celebrity client.	
Bell Biv DeVoe	2–11	Themselves.	
Brandon Quintin	2–12	Ramon: Ashley's friend. He returns as Bryan in 4–18.	
Allen Payne	2–15	Marcus: Will's basketball rival.	
Anna Maria Horsford	2–16	Karen Caruthers, a woman who Geoffrey is attracted to.	
Milton Berle	2–18	Max Jakey: Will's hospital roommate.	
Bernie Kopell	2–18	Reprising his role as Dr. Adam Bricker from The Love Boat in Will's nightmare.	
John Beradino	2–18	Reprising his role as Dr. Steve Harding from General Hospital in Will's nightmare.	
Bob Eubanks	2–19	Himself, as the host of a game show.	
Raven-Symoné	2–21	Claudia, the daughter of Robert, who is Vy's boyfriend in the episode.	
Larenz Tate	3–3	Kenny, a student at Bel-Air Prep who woos Ashley	
Garcelle Beauvais	3–3	Veronica, a student at Bel-Air prep who Will pursues. Also appears in 5–25 and 6–6.	
Lark Voorhies	3–5	Cindy: Carlton's ex-girlfriend	
Sherman Hemsley	3–6, 3–7, and 3–10	Judge Robertson: Uncle Phil's rival. Also George Jefferson in 5–17 and 6–24.	
Oprah Winfrey	3–9	Herself.	
Vanessa Williams	3–11	Danny Mitchell: Will's idol.	
Phil LaMarr	3–15	Edward: Uncle Phil's personal assistant.	
Naya Rivera	3–16	Cindy: Hilary's imagined ideal baby sister.	
Kim Fields	3–17	Monique: Will's girlfriend.	
Tom Jones	3–18	Himself.	
Riddick Bowe	3–21	A bully that confronts Carlton, but fights Will instead.	
D. L. Hughley	3–22	Keith Campbell: Will's comedian friend from Philly.	
Hugh Hefner	4–9	Himself.	
Robin Quivers	4–12	Judith, one of the ghosts playing cards.	
Boyz II Men	4–13	Themselves.	
Sullivan Walker	4–13	Reverend Boyd.	
Branford Marsalis	4–14	Himself. Also plays "Duane" a repair man in 4–18.	
Stacey Dash	4–17	Michelle Michaels, a famous singer/celebrity.	
Robert Guillaume	4–19	Pete Fletcher: Will's boss.	
Cree Summer	4–21	Lisa Adams: Will's girlfriend.	
John Witherspoon	4–21	Augustus Adams, father of Lisa.	
Pam Grier	4–22	Janice Robertson, a former love interest of Uncle Phil.	
Ben Vereen	4–24	Lou Smith: Will's father.	
Donald Trump	4–25	Themselves.	
Marla Maples	4–25	Themselves.	
Dick Clark	4–26	Himself. Returned in 6–19 to co-host bloopers of the show with Will Smith.	
Leeza Gibbons	5–3	Herself.	
Brad Garrett	5–5	John "Fingers" O'Neill.	
Kareem Abdul Jabbar	5–6	Himself.	
Don Cornelius	5–8	Himself.	
Ken Griffey Jr.	5–9	Himself.	
Pat Morita	5–9	Mr. Yoshi, a Martial Arts master who Will comes to learn self-defense from.	
Jay Leno	5–10	Himself. Also in 6–5 again playing himself.	
John Ridley	5–10	Himself.	
Susan Powter	5–11	Herself.	
Isabel Sanford	5–17	Louise Jefferson, couple's therapy member. Returns in 6–24.	
Isaac Hayes	5–18	The Minister, who happens to be an Isaac Hayes impersonator, assigned to officiate Will's express wedding.	
Max Maven	5–21	The Great Mentos, a magician and mentalist that hypnotizes Will.	
Charlie Robinson	5–22	Ernest: Uncle Phil's friend and fraternity brother.	
Robin Givens	5–23	Denise: Will's love interest.	
Chris Rock	6–2	Maurice, a famous actor. Also plays Maurice's sister in the same episode.	
B.B. King	6–4	Pappy, the bar's blues player.	
Jaleel White	6–7	Derek: Ashley's boyfriend.	
Wayne Newton	6–8	Fred, the Casino Manager.	
Galyn Görg	6–12	Helena: Nicky's boxing instructor.	
Fredia Gibbs	6–12	One of the women who was throwing Will around the gym in his nightmare.	
Daniel Riordan	6–12	Stan: Carlton's personal trainer.	
Regis Philbin	6–21	Himself.	
Arthel Neville	6–21	Herself.	
William Shatner	6–22	Himself.	
Conrad Bain	6–24	Phillip Drummond, open house attendee.	
Gary Coleman	6–24	Arnold Jackson-Drummond, open house attendee.	
Marla Gibbs	6–24	Florence Johnston, open house attendee.	

== Episodes ==
Season	Episodes	Originally released		Rank	Rating
Season	Episodes	First released	Last released	Rank	Rating
1	25	September 10, 1990	May 6, 1991	41	12.9
2	24	September 9, 1991	May 4, 1992	18	14.5
3	24	September 14, 1992	May 10, 1993	16	14.6 (Note: Tied with Hangin' with Mr. Cooper and The Jackie Thomas Show)
4	26	September 20, 1993	May 23, 1994	21	13.7 (Note: Tied with Dave's World)
5	25	September 19, 1994	May 15, 1995	55	10.4
6	24	September 18, 1995	May 20, 1996	55	9.6

== Development ==
The cast of The Fresh Prince of Bel-Air, seasons 1–3. From top left: Karyn Parsons, Joseph Marcell, Janet Hubert-Whitten, Alfonso Ribeiro. From bottom left: Tatyana M. Ali, James Avery, Will Smith.

In 1989, music manager Benny Medina, along with his business partner, real estate mogul Jeff Pollack, decided to market a TV story based on Medina's life. Medina had grown up poor in East Los Angeles but his life changed when he befriended a rich white teenager, whose family lived in Beverly Hills and allowed Medina to live with them. Medina decided to use this part of his life as the main focus of the show. However, given that by then a black character living with a white family was a concept that had been done multiple times on TV, Medina decided to change the rich white family to a rich black family. "That way we could explore black-on-black prejudice as well as black class differences", Medina said in an interview for Ebony magazine.

Medina pitched the idea to Quincy Jones, who had just signed a development deal with Warner Bros. Television. Jones was impressed by the idea and arranged a meeting with NBC chief Brandon Tartikoff. Will Smith was well known at the time as one-half of the hip-hop duo DJ Jazzy Jeff & the Fresh Prince, which had put him on the mainstream radar, but he had come into debt after failing to pay taxes. At the suggestion of his then-girlfriend, Smith went to a taping of The Arsenio Hall Show where he met Medina by chance. Medina pitched the idea to Smith, but Smith was reluctant, having never acted before. Medina invited Smith to meet Jones at a party that Jones was throwing at his house in December 1989. There, Jones handed Smith a script for a failed Morris Day pilot that he had produced and challenged Smith to audition for Tartikoff on the spot. Smith did so, and the first contract for the show was drawn up that night in a limo outside.

Andy Borowitz and his wife, Susan, are credited as the series' creators. Andy Borowitz, who was on a contract with NBC, was selected by Tartikoff to write the pilot. He based Will's cousins on Quincy Jones's daughters, and named Carlton after his friend Carlton Cuse. In 2015, he remarked that "it was written and taped in about three weeks, start to finish, and somehow it worked. It was just an explosion of really good luck."

The pilot episode began taping on May 1, 1990. Season 1 first aired in September 1990, and ended in May 1991. The series finale was taped on Thursday, March 21, 1996, and aired on Monday, May 20, 1996.

The theme song "Yo Home to Bel Air" was written and performed by Smith under his stage name, The Fresh Prince. The music was composed by Quincy Jones, who is credited with Smith at the end of each episode. The music often used to bridge scenes together during the show is based on a similar chord structure.

In seasons 1, 5 and 6, the credits would be played over still frames from the episode that aired and was accompanied by an instrumental version of the main theme that played in the background. In seasons 2–4, the music and stills were dropped, and the credits were now played over bloopers from the episode.

The series also occasionally touches on serious social issues, such as child abandonment, racial profiling, gun ownership, substance use disorder, driving under the influence, social inequality, mortality rate, interracial marriage, sexism, age disparity in sexual relationships, white privilege, police brutality, African-American history, social justice, body shaming, ageism, judgement, sex education, grief, and leaving the nest.

Though not a spinoff, The Fresh Prince was described by CNBC reporter Carl Quintanilla and Norman Lear in 2016 as being in the same "universe" as The Cosby Show and A Different World. However, according to Hilary Banks actress Karyn Parsons, the show was actually intended to be different from previous "black family" shows such as not only Diff'rent Strokes, but also The Cosby Show. Speaking with The Independent in July 2020, Parsons stated that "Our show was a little more irreverent – we were definitely sillier and the characters were broader.”

== Crossovers and other appearances ==
During the fall 1991–1992 season, NBC gained two hit television shows to anchor their Monday night lineup (Blossom aired immediately after The Fresh Prince of Bel-Air). To gain popularity between the two shows, Will Smith appeared in the Blossom episode "I'm with the Band" as himself under his rap stage name, The Fresh Prince. That same season, Karyn Parsons appeared in the Blossom episode "Wake Up Little Suzy" as Hilary Banks. Parsons also appeared in the Patti LaBelle sitcom Out All Night as Hilary.

James Avery had a short cameo as "the father from Fresh Prince" on Family Matters, at the end of the episode "Scenes from a Mall". He appears during the credits in a blooper scene where he surprises Reginald VelJohnson on set.

In the House and Fresh Prince were both executive-produced by Winifred Hervey (who served as the latter series' showrunner for its second and third seasons), David Salzman and Quincy Jones. During the second season's first episode, Alfonso Ribeiro and Tatyana Ali appeared as their Fresh Prince characters (Carlton and Ashley Banks) in the crossover episode "Dog Catchers". Later that season, James Avery (Phillip Banks) appeared as a mediator in the episode "Love on a One-Way Street".

Following Fresh Prince's conclusion, Ribeiro joined the principal cast of In the House for its third season as Dr. Maxwell Stanton, who had personality traits similar to those of Carlton. In the season 4 episode "My Pest Friend's Wedding", Avery and Daphne Maxwell Reid (the second Vivian Banks) guest starred as Stanton's parents. Joseph Marcell, Geoffrey Butler on Fresh Prince, appeared as an officiating minister in the same episode.

== Distribution ==
The series was produced by the Stuffed Dog Company and Quincy Jones Entertainment (later Quincy Jones-David Salzman Entertainment in 1993) in association with NBC Productions.

In 1994, the series' distribution rights were picked up by Warner Bros., which continues to hold those rights to this day.

== Home media ==
Warner Home Video has released the complete series on DVD in Region 1. Seasons 1 to 4 have been released in Regions 2 and 4. Seasons 5 to 6 have been released in Region 2 in Germany, and in the complete series boxset in the United Kingdom.

DVD name	Ep #	Release dates		
DVD name	Ep #	Region 1	Region 2	Region 4
The Complete First Season	25	February 8, 2005	February 21, 2005	April 13, 2005
The Complete Second Season	24	October 11, 2005	November 21, 2005	March 1, 2006
The Complete Third Season	24	February 14, 2006	June 26, 2006	August 9, 2006
The Complete Fourth Season	26	August 8, 2006	January 22, 2007	December 6, 2006
The Complete Fifth Season	25	May 11, 2010	June 18, 2010	2018
The Complete Sixth Season	24	April 19, 2011	May 6, 2011	2018
The Complete Series	148	April 12, 2011	September 5, 2016	—N/a

== Awards and nominations ==
Awards	Outcome	Recipient(s)	Year
ASCAP Film and Television Music Awards:
Top TV	Won	Quincy Jones; Will Smith; DJ Jazzy Jeff	1994
Emmy Awards:
Outstanding Individual Achievement in Lighting Direction for a Comedy Series	Nominated	Art Busch	1996
Golden Globe Awards:
Best Performance by an Actor in a TV-Series – Comedy/Musical	Nominated	Will Smith	1994
Best Performance by an Actor in a TV-Series – Comedy/Musical	Nominated	Will Smith	1993
NAACP Image Awards:
Outstanding Comedy Series	Nominated		1997
Outstanding Supporting Actor in a Comedy Series	Won	Alfonso Ribeiro	1996
Outstanding Lead Actor in a Comedy Series	Nominated	Will Smith	1997
Outstanding Youth Actor/Actress	Won	Tatyana M. Ali	1997
Outstanding Supporting Actress in a Comedy Series	Nominated	Janet Hubert-Whitten	1991
Outstanding Supporting Actress in a Comedy Series	Nominated	Nia Long	1996
Outstanding Supporting Actress in a Comedy Series	Nominated	Daphne Maxwell Reid	1996
Kids' Choice Awards:
Favorite Television Actor	Nominated	Will Smith	1996
Favorite Television Show	Nominated		1996
Favorite TV Actress	Nominated	Tatyana M. Ali	1996
NCLR Bravo Awards:
Outstanding Television Series Actor in a Crossover Role	Nominated	Alfonso Ribeiro	1996
TP de Oro:
Best Foreign Series (Mejor Serie Extranjera)	Nominated		1996
Best Foreign Series (Mejor Serie Extranjera)	Won		1994
Teen Choice Awards:
Choice TV Show: Throwback	Nominated		2017
Choice TV Show: Throwback	Nominated		2018
Choice TV Show: Throwback	Nominated		2019
TV Land Awards:
Best Broadcast Butler	Nominated	Joseph Marcell	2004
Favorite "Fish Out of Water"	Nominated	Will Smith	2004
Young Artist Awards:
Best Performance by an Actor Under Ten – Television	Won	Ross Bagley	1996
Best Performance by an Actor Under Ten in a TV Series	Won	Ross Bagley	1995
Best Youth Comedienne	Nominated	Tatyana M. Ali	1994
Best Young Actor Guest Starring in a Television Series	Nominated	Larenz Tate	1993
Best Young Actor Guest Starring or Recurring Role in a TV Series	Nominated	Tevin Campbell	1992
Best New Family Television Comedy Series	Won		1991
YoungStar Award:
Best Performance by a Young Actress in a Comedy TV Series	Won	Tatyana M. Ali	1997

== Cultural impact and legacy ==
The Fresh Prince of Bel-Air's success is considered to be a watershed moment for hip-hop and black television, with many publications referring to it as one of the greatest sitcoms of all time. Professor Andrew Horton stated: "Smith's genre of comedy, popularized on the sitcom Fresh Prince of Bel-Air, translated well into commercial box-office appeal. The Fresh Prince watered down and capitalized upon the then growing popularity of hip-hop and almost anticipated its dominance on the American scene".

Author Willie Tolliver noted: "What The Fresh Prince did accomplish was to put Smith and his character Will into an environment of affluence and possibility, thus changing the terms of his own Black identity. This social and cultural mobility is central to Smith's racial significance, and this will become evident again and again; he moves the image of the Black male into unaccustomed spaces just as Smith himself was in the process of conquering Hollywood."

== Reboot series ==
On August 13, 2015, it was reported that a reboot of the show was in development by Overbrook Entertainment, with Will Smith serving as a producer. In August 2016, during a promotional interview with the E! television network for his then upcoming film Suicide Squad, Smith denied that a reboot was in development, saying that it would happen "...pretty close to when Hell freezes over.”

In 2019, a mock trailer titled Bel-Air was uploaded on YouTube, written and directed by Morgan Cooper, for a darker, more dramatic re-imagining of the sitcom. Will Smith subsequently heavily praised the fan film, commenting that "Morgan did a ridiculous trailer for Bel-Air. Brilliant idea, the dramatic version of The Fresh Prince for the next generation", expressing interest in expanding the idea beyond the short film into a full Bel-Air reboot series.

In August 2020, it was announced that Will Smith and Morgan Cooper would be developing a reboot of the series based on Cooper's Bel-Air. The series had reportedly been in the works for over a year since Cooper posted his Bel-Air trailer on YouTube, with Netflix, Peacock and HBO Max all currently bidding for the series. On September 8, 2020, Peacock gave Bel-Air a two-season order, with the series produced by and copyrighted to Universal Television. In September 2021, the full cast was announced with newcomer Jabari Banks cast as Will Smith, Adrian Holmes as Philip Banks, Cassandra Freeman as Vivian Banks, Olly Sholotan as Carlton Banks, Coco Jones as Hilary Banks, Akira Akbar as Ashley Banks, Jimmy Akingbola as Geoffrey, Jordan L. Jones as Jazz and Simone Joy Jones as Lisa. The series premiered in February 2022.

== Reunion ==
Much of the cast virtually reunited over a video call in an episode of Smith's Snapchat reality series Will From Home that premiered in April 2020. A reunion of the surviving original cast, The Fresh Prince Reunion, aired on HBO Max in November 2020. Among other reminisces, Janet Hubert appeared, also appearing around this time in a joint radio interview with Smith where the two reconcile. More information and context were offered regarding the situation between Smith and Hubert and her exit when the two met for their conversation. Hubert discussed the turmoil in her personal life, her abusive marriage and that she had not actually been fired by the show. She was offered what she described as a "bad deal" to return for the fourth season and she turned it down. Smith talked about how grappling with his rapidly increasing fame at such a young age led him to make decisions during that time that he now regrets and wishes he had made differently. The reunion show also features a tribute to James Avery, who died in 2013, that was shown to the surviving cast. The tribute brought the entire cast to tears.

== Notes ==
The series was re-broadcast on E4 from 2 November 2026 onwards.
