= Chuck Vinson =

American television director and producer

- Born: Chuck Rallen Vinson; July 14, 1956 (age 68); Elkhart, Indiana, U.S.
- Occupation(s): Television director and producer
- Years active: 1982–present

Chuck Rallen Vinson (born July 14, 1956, in Elkhart, Indiana) is an American television director and producer.

== Career ==
Vinson began his career as a stage manager on the sitcom Detective School, going on to stage manage for the sitcom Benson. In 1985, he began stage managing for The Cosby Show, going on to direct his first episode entitled "Twinkle, Twinkle Little Star" co-directing with Carl Lauten.

His other sitcom directing credits include Martin, Clarissa Explains It All, Thea, The Sinbad Show, The Fresh Prince of Bel-Air, Sister, Sister, The Mystery Files of Shelby Woo, Living Single, One World and Sabrina, the Teenage Witch.

In recent years, Vinson has directed number of stand-up comedy specials for Sinbad, Steve Harvey, Mark Curry and Jamie Foxx. He also directed numerous episodes of Last Comic Standing.

His professional awards include. Winner of an EMMY for Outstanding Directing for SESAME STREET-HBO. 2 NAACP IMAGE AWARD for Sinbad Summer Jam-HBO. Cable Ace award for Sinbad Summer Jam-HBO

== Personal life ==
Vinson currently resides in Atlanta, GA with his daughter Spencer.

== Filmography ==
- Sinbad and Friends: All the Way Live... Almost! (1991)
- Sesame Street Stays Up Late! (1993)
- All-Star 25th Birthday: Stars and Street Forever! (1994)
- Sinbad: Son of a Preacher Man (1994)
- The Right Connections (1997)
- Sinbad: Nuthin' But the Funk (1998)
- Classic Rock: The Tubes and Night Ranger (2001)
- Steve Harvey: One Man (2001)
- Jamie Foxx: I Might Need Security (2002)
- Latham Entertainment Presents (2003)
- Tess: Looking for My Next Ex-Husband (2005)
- Gary Gulman: Boyish Man (2005)
- The Kims of Comedy (2005)
- ANT: America's Ready (2005)
- Alonzo Bodden: Tall, Dark, and Funny (2005)
- Sinbad: Where U Been? (2010)
