= Karyn Parsons =

American actress (born 1966)

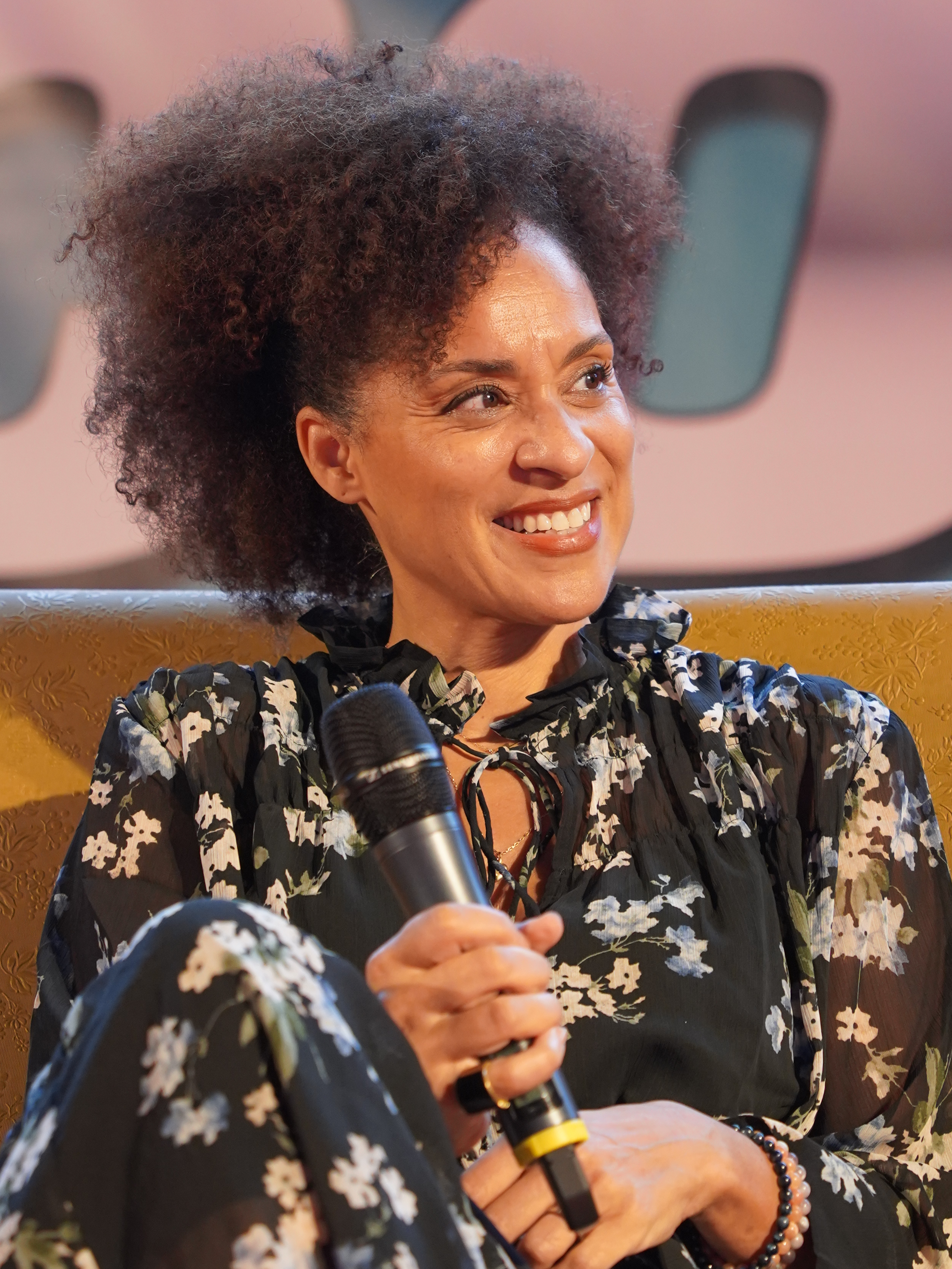
- Parsons in 2021
- Born: Karen L. Parsons; October 8, 1966 (age 60); Los Angeles, California, U.S.
- Occupations: Actress; author; comedian
- Years active: 1987–2002; 2019–present
- Spouses: Randy Brooks (m. 1987; div. 1990) Alexandre Rockwell (m. 2003)
- Children: 2

Karyn Parsons Rockwell (born October 8, 1966) is an American actress, author and comedian. She is best known for her role as Hilary Banks on the NBC sitcom The Fresh Prince of Bel-Air from 1990 to 1996. Parsons also starred in the 1995 film Major Payne opposite Damon Wayans, and in ABC sitcom The Job (2001–2002) as Toni.

== Early life ==
Parsons was born on October 8, 1966, in Los Angeles, California. In an interview for Essence in 2008, she described her parentage as biracial. Her father, Kenneth B. Parsons, was of English, Welsh, Irish, German, and Greek descent, from Butte, Montana, and her mother, Louise (née Hankerson) Parsons, was an African-American from Charleston, South Carolina. She attended Santa Monica High School.

== Career ==
Parsons starred as Hilary Banks on the sitcom The Fresh Prince of Bel-Air, which aired on NBC from 1990 to 1996. She co-created, co-produced, co-wrote, and co-starred on the Fox sitcom Lush Life in 1996, which was canceled after four episodes. In 2001, she starred in the series The Job with Denis Leary. Besides television, Parsons has starred in several films, particularly in comedies such as Late Nights (1992), Major Payne (1995), and The Ladies Man (2000). Parsons is the founder of the Sweet Blackberry Foundation, which produces animated films and books about unsung black heroes. The first video in the series was about Henry Box Brown, a slave who mailed himself to freedom.

Parsons has also published three books for children: a middle-grade novel, How High the Moon (2019), which was loosely inspired by stories of her mother's childhood in the Jim Crow South; and two Sweet Blackberry picture-book biographies about black historical figures, illustrated by R. Gregory Christie: Flying Free (2020) about pioneering aviator Bessie Coleman, and Saving the Day (2021) about inventor Garrett Morgan.

== Personal life ==
Parsons was married to Randy Brooks from 1987 until their separation in 1990. She married director Alexandre Rockwell in 2003. Together they have a daughter, Lana, and a son, Nico. The couple live in Brooklyn, New York.

== Filmography ==
=== Film ===
Year	Title	Role	Notes
1989	Death Spa	Brooke	Her film debut
1992	Class Act	Ellen	
1995	Major Payne	Emily Walburn	
1998	Mixing Nia	Nia	
2000	The Ladies Man	Julie Simmons	
2002	13 Moons	Lily	
2019	On Monday of Last Week	Tracy	Short film
2020	Sweet Thing	Eve	
2026	The Projectionist	Rosa	

=== Television ===
Year	Title	Role	Notes
1987	The Bronx Zoo	Amelia	2 episodes
1988	Hunter	Elizabeth Childs	Episode: "Renegade"
1988	CBS Summer Playhouse	Lynette	Episode: "Roughhouse"
1990–1996	The Fresh Prince of Bel-Air	Hilary Banks	Main role; 147 episodes
1992	Blossom	Hilary Banks	Episode: "Wake Up Little Suzy"
1992	Out All Night	Hilary Banks	Episode: "The Great Pretender"
1995	The John Larroquette Show	Annie	Episode: "Several Unusual Love Stories"
1996	Gulliver's Travels	Lady-in-waiting	Episode: "February 4, 1996"
1996	Lush Life	Margot Hines	Lead role
1999	Melrose Place	Jackie Zambrano	2 episodes
1999	Linc's	Elaine	Episode: "Dog Day Afternoon"
2001–2002	The Job	Toni	Main role
2002	Static Shock	Tracy Flackman	Voice, episode: "Static Shaq"

== Books written ==
- How High the Moon (2019)
- Flying Free (2020)
- Blue Beach (2026)
