= Shelley Jensen =

American director

- Occupations: Television director, producer
- Years active: 1977–2016

Shelley Jensen is an American television director and producer.

Jensen began his career in 1977 as an associate director for the Walt Disney Company. He made his directorial debut in 1985 with an episode of the ABC sitcom Webster. From the 1990s until his retirement in 2016, Jensen continued to direct episodes for a number of other notable television series including The Fresh Prince of Bel-Air, Friends, Suddenly Susan, Amen, What I Like About You, The Drew Carey Show, The Suite Life on Deck, Sonny with a Chance, I'm in the Band, Good Luck Charlie, Shake It Up, Jessie, Austin & Ally, Dog with a Blog, Liv and Maddie, Anger Management, and Best Friends Whenever.

Jensen won a Daytime Emmy Award in 1996 for his directing work on Disney Channel's Adventures in Wonderland winning alongside David Grossman and Gary Halvorson.
