= List of One on One episodes =

The following is an episode list of the television sitcom One on One. The series aired on UPN from September 3, 2001 to May 15, 2006, with 113 episodes produced spanning five seasons.

== Series overview ==
Season	Episodes	Originally released	
Season	Episodes	First released	Last released
1	22	September 3, 2001	May 20, 2002
2	23	September 23, 2002	May 19, 2003
3	24	September 16, 2003	May 25, 2004
4	22	September 20, 2004	May 23, 2005
5	22	September 19, 2005	May 15, 2006

== Episodes ==
=== Season 1 (2001–02) ===
Flex Washington, a successful Baltimore sports reporter and teenage father, lets his teenage daughter, Breanna move in with him after her mother is forced to move to Canada for work.

No. overall	No. in season	Title	Directed by	Written by	Original release date	Viewers (millions)
1	1	"When Flex Got Breanna"	Ellen Gittelsohn	Eunetta T. Boone	September 3, 2001	4.90
Baltimore sportscaster Mark "Flex" Washington finds his bachelor's paradise disrupted when his feisty 14-year-old daughter, Breanna, comes to live with him full-time. Flex is used to the carefree life of a young single man, complete with junk food, sports and women. Breanna is accustomed to no rules and all fun when she visits her dad for two weeks a year. But when the demands of her mother's new job make it necessary for Breanna to move in with her father for the foreseeable future, Flex must adjust to raising a teenager on a day-to-day basis. In the series premiere, Breanna's jealousy of Flex's date causes her to act out, straining their relationship.
2	2	"Jailbait"	Ellen Gittelsohn	Eunetta T. Bonne	September 10, 2001	4.98
When Breanna finds out that her friends are going to a club for ages (14-18) and figures her father won't mind, she decides to follow them to the club. Meanwhile, Duane is trying to avoid a customer he cheated. When Flex comes home from work and finds his parents there and learns that his daughter Breanna was at a club without any permission, he shows her what it's like to be an adult, which isn't easy. Meanwhile, Duane ends up at Flex's house with the customer he cheated.
3	3	"Radioactive Platonic"	Ellen Gittelsohn	Kenny Smith	September 17, 2001	4.07
Flex gets his first taste of what it's like to be an overprotective father when Tracy, Breanna's best friend from Atlanta, comes for a weekend visit and is revealed to be a 16-year-old boy. The situation becomes even more complicated when Breanna discovers that she may have more than friendly feelings for Tracy and seeks out dating advice from Flex's girlfriend, Tonya. Meanwhile, Duane makes a bird-brained attempt to get an autograph from the retiring Cal Ripken Jr.
4	4	"School Dazed"	Ellen Gittelsohn	Arthur Harris	September 24, 2001	5.08
Flex and Breanna find themselves at loggerheads over where she should go to school. While Breanna is eager to attend a funky public school for the performing arts, Flex prefers that she enroll in a posh private academy. But once he hears her excruciatingly bad singing voice, he agrees to let her audition for the performing arts school.
5	5	"My Life as a Dog"	Ellen Gittelsohn	Bill Fuller & Jim Pond	October 1, 2001	4.62
Flex is dismayed when Breanna tries to recover from her recent heartbreak by taking on the persona of a "player," flirting outrageously and toying with every boy around. But he is even more distressed to discover that she's emulating him.
6	6	"Let's Wait Awhile"	Ellen Gittelsohn	Stacy A. Littlejohn	October 8, 2001	4.33
While Breanna is away on a school ski trip, Flex snoops into her room where he makes a shocking discovery. In alarm, he rushes to the ski resort to put a halt to her shenanigans and to have a long-overdue fatherly talk about the birds and the bees.
7	7	"Playing Possum"	Ellen Gittelsohn	Eunetta T. Bonne	October 15, 2001	5.18
Breanna's crush on a handsome football player inspires her to do the unthinkable. Meanwhile, Duane pulls a fast one on Flex, who finds himself in a surprising new sideline.
8	8	"Phantom Menace"	Ellen Gittelsohn	Eric Lev	October 29, 2001	5.21
Flex's competitive spirit is kicked into high gear when an old nemesis named Elliott, a successful player on and off the court, moves into the neighborhood. His apprehension grows worse when the man throws a hot Halloween party. Meanwhile, Breanna, Spirit, and Arnaz's spying leads them to witness something they wish they hadn't seen.
9	9	"Fifteen Candles"	Ellen Gittelsohn	Al Sonja L. Rice	November 5, 2001	5.41
It's Breanna's 15th birthday, and she's very excited. After receiving such cool presents from her grandma and mom, Flex tries to top them all by inviting Lil' Zane to Breanna's birthday party. Everything starts to go wrong when Duane tells Breanna before Flex can actually invite him. In the end, after all that stalking, Flex is finally able to get him to perform at Breanna's birthday party.
10	10	"Mi Casa Es Mi Casa"	Ellen Gittelsohn	Arthur Harris	November 12, 2001	4.1
MTV decides to shoot a documentary of Flex's home, but Tonya decides to decorate his home before they come. After the finishing touches, Flex's manly bachelor pad turns into a woman's dream house. He decides to change his apartment back to the way it was and change the date of the documentary. When Tonya finds out, she gets deeply hurt and decides that their relationship is over.
11	11	"Thanksgiving It to Me, Baby"	Ellen Gittelsohn	Meg DeLoatch	November 19, 2001	5.36
Breanna's mother comes to town for Thanksgiving. Flex disagrees at first, but he soon falls in love with her again. They make love, and the next day, Breanna catches them, thinking that her parents are coming back together again. Later they attend Breanna's football game and start arguing, so Breanna has some second thoughts about this parents together thing.
12	12	"Santa Baby"	Ken Whittingham	Kenny Smith	December 17, 2001	3.85
Once again, Breanna's mother has come over for the holidays. This time she feels sick. Later on, Flex's whole family comes over for Christmas, and Breanna's grandma discovers that Nicole is pregnant. Breanna overhears this and tells Flex. At first, they're all happy about it, thinking that it's a miracle, but when she takes a pregnancy test, she realizes that there's no baby. But Breanna says that there's still a miracle because her parents are together for Christmas. Also Brenna's guide will soon be her sister Angela.
13	13	"Tame Me, I'm the Shrew"	Dana DeVally Piazza	Kenny Buford	January 21, 2002	3.93
Breanna gets the leading part in a play called Shakespeare's The Taming of the Shrew. When the lines become old and whack, Breanna decides to liven it up in a 2Pac version, but when she lets her ego get the best of her, the director decides that Spirit should have the role, leaving Breanna as her understudy. Meanwhile, Flex is having some competition trying to get the lead sports anchor position at his job. Duane has discovered that he is related to Dr. Martin Luther King Jr., so he decides to make a tunnel to honor him.
14	14	"The Case of the Almost Broken Heart"	Ellen Gittelsohn	Eunetta T. Boone & Arthur Harris	February 4, 2002	3.89
After Flex's father eats unhealthily and gets a heart attack, Flex decides to take risks and live his life like his last day everyday. Meanwhile, at Breanna's high school, the upcoming Ghetto-Fabulous dance arrives, and Arnaz brings his country cousin for a visit. She wants to go to the dance, but not until Breanna and Spirit give her a ghetto makeover.
15	15	"Adventures in Double Dating"	Ellen Gittelsohn	Eric Lev	February 11, 2002	4.03
Breanna goes on her first date with a boy named Keith, and just as Duane and Flex remember their dating days, he decides to tag along with Breanna on her date. They go to the movies and Flex annoys the couple even more. When he finally decides to go to see another movie, he runs into the sexy mother of Breanna's boyfriend! The kids of the parents are not happy, and Breanna and Keith put their heads together to think of a way for their parents to stop dating. Meanwhile, Duane has to take his boss's wife out to dinner, but she begins to fall madly in love with Duane and wants him. When Duane says no, she starts to think she is unattractive to him, until Nate Dogg shows up and woos her.
16	16	"Me & My Shadow"	Ellen Gittelsohn	Meg DeLoatch	February 25, 2002	4.55
When a music contest comes up, Flex and Duane decide to have a reunion with their highschool band "Midnight Gold", but during rehearsals, Duane turns out to have an incredible singing voice, and the band wants him as their leader instead of Flex. But will he remain in Flex's shadow forever or will he finally stand up to Flex and make something of himself? Meanwhile, when Tiffany gets a broken ankle, she tricks Breanna into being the coach of the cheerleaders for revenge, but in the end, Breanna's efforts on the team help them win a cheerleading trophy award, which Tiffany decides to take credit for.
17	17	"It's Raining Women"	Ellen Gittelsohn	Bill Fuller & Jim Pond	March 4, 2002	4.0
Flex is a ladies' man and can't help but love to tangle with the opposite sex, but when he makes a bet with Stacy, his boss, to keep off of women for three days, he has to learn to diminish his cravings. Also, Arnaz plays one of Flex's old albums, and Breanna scratches it. When Duane sees this, they become his slaves so he'll keep his mouth shut, until Flex finds out and tells them that Duane scratched it a long time ago, so Breanna, Arnaz, and Spirit then plan to get revenge. Guest Star: Lisa Leslie
18	18	"The Way You Make Me Feel"	Ellen Gittelsohn	Stacy A. Littlejohn	March 25, 2002	4.27
Flex dates famous show host Michelle McCall. She'll date him and do anything for him, but only if he keeps their relationship secret so her fans won't find out what she's been up to. They make love, and the next day, cameras and news reporters come flooding to Flex's door finding out about their relationship. Flex soon finds out that Duane is the one who squealed. Meanwhile, Breanna's friend Natasha comes to town and has a crush on Arnaz. When they meet, they instantly fall in love, but Natasha asks Breanna's permission to date Arnaz. She allows her, and they take their relationship to the next level, but Breanna gets jealous along the way.
19	19	"Love Means Never Having to Say I Know You"	Ellen Gittelsohn	Charlie Bonomo	April 29, 2002	2.91
Flex thinks that he and his boss Stacy are hitting it off, but what he doesn't know is that his best friend Duane has been secretly dating her. It's hard for them to hide it from Flex, but when they both have to go on a business trip together, Duane takes it to the extreme. While Flex is out of town, Breanna and Spirit throw a party. Arnaz brings Natasha over, and Breanna once again gets jealous. She tries to stop them, but when they're about to have sex, all Arnaz can think about is Breanna. Also, a boy named Lewis tries to get with Breanna. At the trip, Duane can't take it and tries to stop Stacy and Flex from having sex, only to reveal his relationship to Flex.
20	20	"Fatal Attractions"	Ellen Gittelsohn	Bennie R. Richburg Jr. & Kenny Smith	May 6, 2002	3.44
At McKinley High School, all the cool boys are called "Pros." They have a "Hottie List," and if you're a girl and you get on it, you're a "Hottie." Breanna gets on the list and starts to think that she's cool. Spirit didn't get on the list, so she starts to dress sexy to impress Derrick, the leader of the McKinley Pros. Meanwhile, at a hangout, Flex meets an old flame, his ex-girlfriend Tonya, who is engaged to be married to her new guy. She tells Flex that she met him at an anger support group when they broke up, and now she and Flex decide to be friends, but this gets complicated when they start to have feelings for each other in his apartment. Back at the high school, Arnaz gets to be the new member of the McKinley Pros and finds out from Derrick that they are also known as the Panty Posse, who have sex with all the "Hotties." At the party, Derrick plans to have sex with Spirit, but Breanna and Arnaz stop it. Flex goes over to Tonya's apartment late at night and, not knowing it's Flex, but thinking it's a burglar, she knocks him out.
21	21	"Misery"	Ellen Gittelsohn	Stacy A. Littlejohn	May 13, 2002	4.04
Tonya turns on the lights, and a shocked Flex wakes up. She tells him that she thought he was a burglar. After that, they turn off the lights and make love all weekend. By Monday, Flex can't find his keys because Tonya has hidden them. She wants to have more sex with Flex, but he has to go to work, so he spots his keys and runs the minute she's not looking. When he's finished at his job and gets home from work, the house is filled with romantic items. Breanna says that it's from Tonya and she has called off her engagement to her fiance. Flex goes to Tonya immediately and tries to reason with her, but she won't listen. When he leaves, she throws his picture at a wall. Flex then tries to woo another woman, but the waiters, along with the serenaders, keep doing things that remind Flex of Tonya. Then, the main waiter says that these were all compliments of his wife Tonya. That puts a dent in Flex's evening and he suddenly remembers why he didn't commit to Tonya, because she's literally crazy about him! Meanwhile, Breanna tries to ask Arnaz to the May Moonlight Dance, but he has plans with another girl, so she lies and says that she has plans with someone, too. She and Spirit go by themselves and at the party, Breanna tries to insult Arnaz's date, but the embarrassment turns on her as she spills her drink on her dress. Saddened by this, she goes home. Flex and Duane plot a scheme to get rid of Tonya by acting very unattractive. In the beginning, it works, but by the next day, she is used to it and still wants Flex. However, he acts serious and tells her about the whole plot which breaks her heart. Breanna decides to call Arnaz and tell him her true feelings, but his answering machine goes on. She is nervous and decides to quit, but Spirit tells Arnaz to come over to Breanna's house.
22	22	"He Got Game... Again"	Ellen Gittelsohn	Story by : Meg DeLoatch; Teleplay by : Jim Pond & Bill Fuller	May 20, 2002	5.20
Spirit and Breanna practice before Arnaz shows up, but when he does, Breanna gets nervous and messes up. She decides to tell Arnaz that she loves him another way by putting her feelings for him on a video tape. The problem is, she unknowingly had a chunk of spinach in her teeth while recording it. Meanwhile, Breanna's mother Nicole has come back in town to host a celebrity basketball game, and Flex decides to be in it. Breanna thinks he'll be okay, but Nicole warns her that her father is more in love with basketball than herself. During practice, he seems a little rusty, but in the last quarter of the game, the coach puts him in, and he turns out to be very talented at basketball. After the game, the coach decides to return him to the NBA. He accepts, but Nicole warns him that he might not have time for Breanna anymore, but Flex says that he'll always make room for his daughter. Back at the house, Breanna finds out that she had spinach in her teeth, so she and Spirit go undercover to get the tape back, but they get caught by Arnaz, who doesn't have a clue. Breanna then tells her mother about the situation, and she decides to take Breanna back to Nova Scotia forever to live with her. Flex finds out and doesn't want Breanna to go, but Nicole reminds him that they agreed that Breanna would only stay with Flex for a year and that whole year is up! Breanna and Spirit groan for losing the tape. Suddenly, the doorbell rings, and Arnaz appears at the door with the video tape in his hand.

=== Season 2 (2002–03) ===
The lives and relationships of Flex, Breanna, and their friends are about to undergo significant change, but as usual, things don't always turn out as expected.

No. overall	No. in season	Title	Directed by	Written by	Original release date	Viewers (millions)
23	1	"I Believe I Can Fly (Part 1)"	Ken Whittingham	Eunetta T. Boone	September 23, 2002	4.98
Arnaz comes over to Breanna's house with the tape and taunts her with it. Breanna denies what she said to Arnaz on the tape, but he says that he'll get her to say those words again if it kills him. Meanwhile Nicole tells Flex that she's taking Breanna to live with her in Nova Scotia, but Flex says he can work it out. Nicole then says that he has to choose between his dream career as a professional basketball player on the NBA or giving it up for Breanna. Breanna then comes in and she and Flex both try to reason with Nicole, but her mind is made up. She asks Flex why should Breanna have a half-time dad when she can have a full-time mom. This makes Flex give up and decide to join the NBA. This saddens Breanna and she and Spirit spend some final time together as friends. Arnaz comes and he once again confronts Breanna about her true feelings. Just as she's about to admit them, one of Arnaz's old girlfriends, Ginger, comes and steals him away. Spirit encourages Breanna to catch Arnaz, but Breanna says it's no use because she's moving to Nova Scotia. Meanwhile, Flex goes down to a barbershop to drown his sorrows and gets encouragement from all his friends to join the NBA. Flex is unsure until Breanna comes and decides that she'll let her father live out his dream if it'll make him happy.
24	2	"I Believe I Can Fly (Part 2)"	Ken Whittingham	Arthur Harris, Jr.	September 30, 2002	5.02
Flex struggles with being a 33-year-old rookie in the NBA. Breanna bumps heads with Nicole over her strict parenting style. Nicole tells her to get used to it because she's going to Nova Scotia. Breanna then tells all her friends goodbye and she and Arnaz share a goodbye kiss. Seeing how sad her daughter is, Nicole decides to give up her dream job and stay in Baltimore. Meanwhile, Flex gets fired as a basketball player because he doesn't put any heart into the game like all the other players do and realizes that his heart belongs to Breanna instead. He comes back home, and Nicole and Breanna have returned. Breanna says that Nicole is going to live in Flex's apartment with them until she gets a new job and apartment.
25	3	"Unemployment Up, Pride Down"	Ken Whittingham	Kenny Smith	October 7, 2002	4.90
Nicole struggles to get a new job in Baltimore. Meanwhile, when Flex comes back to his newscaster job, he finds out that he's been bumped down to a weatherman. Breanna tells Arnaz and her friends that she's not moving.
26	4	"Daddy in Overdrive"	Leonard R. Garner, Jr.	Meg DeLoatch	October 14, 2002	5.39
Breanna tries to get her learner's permit, so Flex decides to teach her how to drive. All seems to go well until he freaks out and becomes overprotective of Breanna on the open road. Meanwhile, Duane is interested at a woman at his gym, but she only likes to date built men, so he takes diet pills. Breanna, annoyed by her dad, gets Arnaz, Duane, and her grandparents to teach her how to drive, but they all react just like Flex. Flex then realizes how overprotective he is, but he tells Breanna it's because he loves her. Flex suggests that maybe she should get a professional teacher who doesn't know her and Breanna agrees. Duane gets off his diet pills and wins the woman's heart in the end.
27	5	"Pop Art"	Mark Cendrowski	Susan Nirah Jaffee	October 21, 2002	4.43
Breanna gets a new art teacher at school called Ms. Natalie Odessa. Unlike all of her old boring teachers, Breanna likes Ms. Odessa because she can relate to her students. Unfortunately, at a parent-teacher conference, Flex tries to hit on Ms. Odessa, and Breanna doesn't like this. Fortunately for Breanna, Natalie doesn't fall for all his corny pick up lines. Flex thinks he can still get her, but Breanna makes a bet that he can't. Meanwhile, Duane tries to move out of his mother's basement. The next night, Flex invites her to dinner, but Spirit eavesdrops on them, tells Breanna, and she shows up at the dinner instead. She informs him that he lost the bet, but Flex still tries to get her. He attends her annual art fair and once again tries his corny pick up lines, but they don't work. Then Natalie shows him a work of art and Flex expresses his feelings towards the painting. Flex realizes that Natalie forced him to be real and she starts to like him. They start to date and Breanna realizes she lost the bet. Also, Duane finds an apartment right next to Flex's.
28	6	"Give Me Some Credit"	John Tracy	Erica Montolfo	October 28, 2002	5.17
When there's a sale at their favorite store, Breanna and Spirit want to buy everything there, but Flex won't allow them to. He tells Breanna that when he was a kid, everything he got he earned for, so Breanna applies for a credit card. Meanwhile, Flex continues to see Breanna's art teacher, but Breanna warns her that he usually breaks up with girls on their 30th day. Back at the mall, Breanna, Spirit and Arnaz buy out the entire mall with her credit card, but when she can't find it when they go home, she reports it stolen. Duane finds it near the couch and assumes it's Flex's. He gives it to him and drowns out his sorrows for losing Stacy. At the store Flex and Duane use the card, but it gets cut up by the cashier because of Breanna's report. Flex then winds up in jail and loses his relationship with Natalie. Breanna eventually finds out what happened and she bails them out and explains the whole thing with the credit card. Flex then goes over to Natalie's house, explains to her everything that happened, and saves his relationship. Marc Evan Jackson guest stars as the store clerk.
29	7	"Give'm an Inch, They'll Throw a Rave"	Ken Whittingham	David Hoge & Dan Cross	November 4, 2002	4.74
Arnaz and Spirit's parents have complete discipline and strict control over them, but not Breanna's. Breanna's dad completely trusts her and defends her. Breanna then decides to take this to her advantage and throw a rave at an old abandoned warehouse to raise enough money for a car. Unfortunately, two teenagers mistake the rave to be at Breanna's house and Flex finds out. He then gets Spirit and Arnaz's parents to help him find their kids. Meanwhile at the rave, the party gets a little wild and uncontrollable for Breanna to handle, but then suddenly Method Man appears and calms down the crowd with his rap music. Arnaz's mother, being the owner of the abandoned warehouse, figures out where they are, and Breanna gets busted. When they arrive home, Flex realizes that he's too trustworthy. He tells Breanna that her little stunt made him realize that he has to be a father to her, not her friend. Method Man guest stars in this episode.
30	8	"A Fla-Dap by Any Other Name"	Brian K. Roberts	Eric Lev	November 11, 2002	5.02
Breanna starts to date a new cute guy at her school named Josh, but Flex plans to end their relationship when he finds out that he is the son of his rival for his sportscasting job. Meanwhile, Arnaz seems to be getting bored with his relationship with Ginger. He wants to get with Breanna again, but he soon discovers that she and Josh are dating now.
31	9	"A Crappy Birthday"	Brian K. Roberts	Arthur Harris	November 18, 2002	4.89
It's Breanna's 16th birthday, and Flex's fulfills her greatest birthday wish by getting her a car. Knowing just how expensive cars are, Flex tries to get Breanna a cheap used car by going to Duane's car lot and pulling a fast one on him. With a lot of negotiations, Duane allows Flex to get the best car out of the lot for a really cheap price. When Breanna, Spirit, and Arnaz drive, it suddenly breaks down after a mile or two. When Flex tries to get Duane to pay for fixing the car, he refuses and they decide to take it to court and sue each other on the courtroom show "Judge Joe Brown". When they arrive, it seems that both of them are guilty for trying to scam each other, so nobody wins. In the end, Flex and Duane realize their mistakes. They make up and both of them decide to pay for Breanna's broken car.
32	10	"Is It Safe?"	Ken Whittingham	Charlie Bonomo	November 25, 2002	4.35
After he accidentally injures pro-football player Michael Irvin during an interview, Flex is targeted by a stalker. Meanwhile, Breanna's plans to be named sophomore queen at the Harvest Moon Dance may go for naught when an overly paranoid Flex restricts her and himself to the apartment. WWE wrestler Big Show guest stars as Flex's bodyguard.
33	11	"Everybody Loves Whom?"	Gerren Keith	Eunetta T. Boone	December 16, 2002	5.35
Flex is excited to be spending Christmas with his current girlfriend Natalie, but quickly becomes jealous when his ex-wife Nicole comes over with her new boyfriend. Meanwhile Breanna exchanges kisses and gifts from both Josh and Arnaz.
34	12	"Daddy, I Don't Need an Edumacation"	Ken Whittingham	Kenny Smith Jr.	January 6, 2003	4.40
McKinley High is taking the PSATs and every student is doing their best to prepare for the test. Nicole starts to go all out and she gives Breanna many studying tools to prepare for it, but Breanna doesn't take the PSATs seriously. After taking the PSATs, the results come on Parent-Teacher Night. By the time Flex and Nicole get to Breanna's teacher to learn about her results, they discover that Breanna scored the lowest in the state. They ask her why and Breanna says she scored that score because she just wrote anything down. She doesn't want to go to college because she wants to become an actor. Flex and Nicole then come up with an ingenious plan to show Breanna the error of her ways. It works, and when Breanna retakes the test, she gets the highest score in the state. Meanwhile Duane tries to give his apartment door an artistic decor, but the landlord refuses to let him keep it.
35	13	"Daddy's Other Girl"	Maynard Virgil	Michael Carrington	February 3, 2003	4.06
Flex's little sister, Bernadette, has come to Baltimore to announce to her brother that she has given up her successful career in law to become a fashion model. Flex tries to figure out how to break the news to their dad. Meanwhile, when Breanna gets a baby from her Home Economics class, Josh and Arnaz become competitive to be its father.
36	14	"The One About Friends"	Brian K. Roberts	David Hoge & Dan Cross	February 4, 2003	1.95
Natalie wants to spend more quality time with Flex, but he wants to have time for himself to watch his sports games, so she starts spending time with Duane instead. When Flex finds out, he becomes jealous. Meanwhile, at a sleepover, Breanna discovers that Spirit has kissed Arnaz before, causing a problem in their friendship.
37	15	"The Test"	Brian K. Roberts	Meg DeLoatch	February 10, 2003	3.95
Natalie informs Flex that he has to be tested for HIV before she considers having sex with him. Flex takes the test, but is scared that he might have HIV after waiting a long time for his results. Meanwhile, Spirit feels left out because Breanna and Arnaz have dates and she doesn't, but when she suddenly finds a date for the Saddie Hawkins dance, Breanna and everybody else start to think she's crazy Mario guest stars in this episode
38	16	"Take This Job and Love It"	Mary Lou Belli	Susan Nirah Jaffee	February 17, 2003	3.59
Breanna takes a job at a burger joint, but her ideas to improve the working environment don't sit well with her boss. Elsewhere, Flex lets Walt cut his hair while Malik is out of town, then goes to great lengths to hide the fact. Meanwhile, Duane and Candy go on a date.
39	17	"Where Everybody Knows Your Name"	Katy Garretson	Bill Fuller & Jim Pond	February 24, 2003	3.96
While his father is away, Flex assumes control of the barbershop, but his tenure turns rocky when a hair salon opens nearby. Meanwhile, Breanna loses track of Spirit and her other friends after she begins hanging out exclusively with Josh.
40	18	"I Know What You Did Last Thursday"	Chip Hurd	Eric Lev	March 17, 2003	3.81
Breanna begins to see Flex, Natalie, and herself becoming one, big happy family…until she catches Natalie on a date with another man.
41	19	"Meet the Parents"	Gary Shimokawa	Arthur Harris & Charlie Bonomo	April 14, 2003	3.80
Flex throws a retirement party for his father. There, a nervous Natalie meets his mother, Eunice, for the first time, who disapproves of her. Flex doesn't understand at first, but when Flex's paternal grandmother still holds her grudge against his mother, he starts to understand why. Meanwhile Breanna, Spirit, and Arnaz look after Eunice's dog, but it dies when Breanna runs over it with her car.
42	20	"Checkmate Daddy"	Brian K. Roberts	Bennie R. Richburg Jr.	April 28, 2003	3.87
Breanna tries to keep Flex away from McKinley High fundraiser week because of his competitive nature, but when he gets wind of it, he winds up embroiled in a competition with Spirit's mom Leilani.
43	21	"Heart to Heart"	Maynard Virgil	Erica Montolfo	May 5, 2003	3.49
When her apartment gets infested with mice, Natalie decides to move in with Flex. Flex allows her to stay for a while, but has second thoughts when Duane reminds him that he has had trouble in the past with commitment in relationships (Examples: Tonya (Mi Casa Es Mi Casa & Misery) and Nicole (Thanksgiving It To Me, Baby)). Meanwhile at McKinley High, Ginger discovers the locket that Arnaz gave Breanna at Christmas (Everybody Loves Whom?) and breaks up with him. Ginger then tells Josh, but he doesn't believe her. Then he goes to Breanna and Arnaz himself and connects the two half heart lockets that forms a whole. Josh doesn't break up with Breanna, but instead forces her to choose between him and Arnaz. Meanwhile, Flex is still having trouble adjusting to Natalie living with him, so much trouble that he has an anxiety attack. After Natalie brings him to the hospital, she discovers the truth. The doctor advises them to work out their problems. When Flex and Natalie return home, they try to do just that, but Flex's issues with commitment are just so strong that Natalie breaks up with him. When she leaves, Flex is heartbroken. Breanna then tries to cheer him up by burdening him with her problems. She says that she thinks it's time she made the choice between Josh and Arnaz, and Flex says he thinks it's time he married Natalie.
44	22	"Stuck on You"	Ken Whittingham	MaLyssa Scott	May 12, 2003	3.64
Nicole comes back and announces that Jayden has gotten a job in Africa and she's gonna be living with him for a short while. Flex fears that she's gonna take Breanna with her, but she says that he's got nothing to fear. Besides that, Flex says that he's happy that she is having a great relationship with Jayden. Nicole asks Flex the same question, and he says that he plans to propose to Natalie. Nicole decides then to help him pick out a ring. Meanwhile Josh and Arnaz pressure Breanna to choose between them while the whole school places bets (thanks to Spirit) on who she will choose. Shortly afterwards, she gets tonsillitis. Flex and Nicole go to the jewelry shop and pick out the perfect ring for Natalie to have, and it accidentally gets stuck on Nicole's finger while admiring it. During that time, she, Flex, and Duane remember Nicole's pregnancy and that that was the main reason they got married. Natalie shortly comes over and she finds out that Nicole is going to Africa and gives her a going away present. Breanna gets over her tonsillitis, but Duane catches it. Meanwhile at the hospital, the ring finally comes off of Nicole's finger. After that, they part ways, and Flex drives Nicole to the airport. They both say that they will miss each other. Then they have another memory of promising that they'd always love each other in high school. Breanna gives Josh one last kiss and she makes her choice: Arnaz.
45	23	"Find My Wife... Please"	Ken Whittingham	Eunetta T. Boone	May 19, 2003	3.88
Duane is depressed when he finds out that his cholesterol level is too high. The doctor tells him that it's genetic, so he and Flex go in search of Duane's father. Meanwhile, Natalie accidentally finds the engagement ring Flex plans to give her. The search for Duane's dad leads him to a professional, who tells him that Duane's father was an ex-con, but is now working for the C.I.A. Flex doesn't believe this guy, but when he digs up some info on Flex that only his family knows, he's convinced. The professional also looks up Flex's marital records and discovers that Flex and Nicole are still married! Meanwhile Breanna and Arnaz finally become a couple. Things are going great for them, except for Josh, who still has a thing for Breanna, but is heartbroken. Breanna wants to be friends with Josh, but he is unsure. Later on, Josh runs into Ginger, who comes up with a plan for him to get Breanna, and for her to keep Arnaz. Josh then decides to agree with the plan and becomes Breanna's friend. He takes her to the Burger Hut where they run into Arnaz and Ginger kissing. Breanna sees this and breaks up with him. Meanwhile, Flex tries to stop himself from proposing to Natalie, but she keeps dropping him hints. He finally does propose to Natalie to get her off his back, but Duane accidentally mentions that Flex is still married to Nicole. Flex then tries to solve this by contacting Nicole, but he discovers from a message on his answering machine that Nicole and Jayden's safari car was destroyed and they are lost in Africa. Breanna overhears this and wonders if her mom is okay, but a worried Flex has no idea.

=== Season 3 (2003–04) ===
Breanna develops as an artist, but she still finds her love life to be as confusing as ever. Flex tries to address certain issues in order to move forward.

No. overall	No. in season	Title	Directed by	Written by	Original release date	Viewers (millions)
46	1	"It's a Family Thing"	Brian K. Roberts	Eunetta T. Boone	September 16, 2003	3.46
One month later, in order to find Nicole, Flex gets fellow news reporters to help him find her. Suddenly, she then turns up at his door unharmed arriving from Africa. She says that she and Jayden escaped the jungle and were living in a tent for a month. Flex then drops the bomb on Nicole and says that they are still legally married which shocks Nicole. Meanwhile Josh comforts Breanna in her time of need. Arnaz tries to get Ginger to tell Breanna the truth about what really happened at the Burger Hut, but Ginger only makes the situation worse by saying they slept together. To get back at Arnaz, she and Josh plan to have sex, but Arnaz catches them. Arnaz then accuses Josh of helping Ginger to break them up. Josh denies this and he and Arnaz start fighting, but then Breanna tells both of them to leave saying that she does not know whom to believe anymore. Meanwhile, in divorce court, Judge Mablean says that because Flex and Nicole are still legally married and because they have had sex 2 years ago (on Thanksgiving 2001) she will not grant them their divorce and she suggests that they go to marriage counseling. At marriage counseling, Flex and Nicole resolve their issues and realize that maybe they should have made their marriage work. After the marriage counseling session, the judge also says that a divorce can't be made until they separate for one year. When Flex tells the news to Natalie, she gets mad and says that they should break up not only because he's still legally married, but also because he still hasn't gotten over Nicole. After a talk with her father about love, Breanna talks to Arnaz, having decided that they should not date until both of them are ready.
47	2	"Stepmom, Misstep"	Brian K. Roberts	Dan Cross & David Hoge	September 23, 2003	3.31
Natalie tries to ease Breanna's broken heart by inviting her and Spirit along on her romantic weekend away with Flex, but her first attempt at being "step mom" backfires when she ends up being too overprotective about the little things and too lenient when it comes to boys.
48	3	"Creepin'"	Brian K. Roberts	Susan Nirah Jaffee	September 30, 2003	3.93
Flex and Breanna swear off dating, deciding they only need each other, while Candy & Duane host a speed dating party.
49	4	"PTAmore"	Ken Whittingham	Arthur Harris	October 7, 2003	3.03
After Flex comes home and finds Breanna taking pics of hot young boys for a beefcake calendar for school Flex then decides to go to the PTA and argue over it. He then discovers that Spirit's mom Leilani is the president of the PTA and the beefcake calendar was her idea. Flex then decides to overthrow her and he does by providing the other women in the PTA meeting advice on their love lives. Meanwhile Arnaz decides to form a strike against the beefcake calendar because Breanna didn't include him in it. Also Duane buys a new refrigerator for his apartment but winds up getting stuck behind it.
50	5	"2 Young, 2 Curious"	Ken Whittingham	Bennie R. Richburg Jr.	October 14, 2003	3.21
Flex, feeling old, meets a young girl at a club who is, unbeknownst to him, a classmate of Breanna's.
51	6	"One Hand Washington's the Other"	Chip Hurd	Erica Montolfo-Bura	October 21, 2003	3.48
In an effort to improve his show's flagging ratings, Flex uses Breanna to get an exclusive interview with a Russian basketball star who is playing at her school.
52	7	"I Hear White People"	Gary Shimokawa	Eric Lev & Kenny Smith Jr.	November 4, 2003	3.24
After a freak accident, Duane inexplicably hears the thoughts of white people around him and becomes more aware of the racism that exists in their minds, so Flex decides to use Duane's new power to find out if his job is in jeopardy after suspecting the new station management is discriminating against the African-American employees.
53	8	"Keeping It"	Mary Lou Belli	Susan Nirah Jaffee	November 11, 2003	3.23
Asanti, the most popular cheerleader in Breanna's cheerleading squad, shares good news with the other cheerleaders about her losing her virginity with her boyfriend Rodney. The entire squad is happy for her, but when the cheerleading squad discovers that Breanna and Spirit are still virgins, their popularity is threatened. Giving into peer pressure, Breanna and Spirit decide to lose their virginity quick. Meanwhile, after a burglar almost robs Duane's apartment, he and Flex decide to patrol the building to catch the crook. Also Arnaz's mom, Cheryl, is worried about Arnaz and his raging hormones, so Flex decides to talk to Arnaz about the birds and the bees. The next night, Breanna decides to have sex with Arnaz to lose her virginity and remain popular, but she changes her mind when Arnaz reveals he's not a virgin! After a long talk with Flex, she realizes that she made the right choice and decides to wait until she's all grown up to have sex.
54	9	"Tears of a Clown"	Ken Whittingham	Arthur Harris	November 18, 2003	3.94
WYNX has a new producer named Geraldine, who has fired the old producer Hank and hired a new sidekick named Holly to help Flex out with the Flex Files to increase ratings. Holly at first seems like a dumb blonde, but she later on proves her intelligence to Flex as she proves that her "dumb-blonde" act is just a tease she uses to help get more viewers. Meanwhile Duane finally meets his father, but it turns out that he's only come because he needs Duane's kidney. Also Breanna tries to figure out who Arnaz lost his virginity to, while Spirit works on a unique design to get her way into a fashion college.
55	10	"Spy Games"	Gary Shimokawa	Dan Cross & David Hoge	November 25, 2003	3.42
When Flex falls for Sheila, an ambitious, sexy sports columnist, he is willing to do anything for her, including bribing Breanna to tutor her son Eric. But when Eric is caught stealing Flex's stories from his computer to give to his mother, Flex and Breanna team up to seek revenge. Guest Star: Lil' Romeo (as Eric)
56	11	"It's a Miserable Life"	Gary Shimokawa	Susan Watanabe	December 16, 2003	3.55
Nicole comes home announcing that she is pregnant and plans to marry her boyfriend, Jayden, shattering Breanna's hope that her parents will remarry. While planning the wedding, Breanna falls asleep at Duane's and sees what her life would be like if her parents were still married.
57	12	"Dream Seller"	Ken Whittingham	Bennie R. Richburg Jr.	January 13, 2004	3.05
With Flex's father out of town, it's his job to look over his father's barbershop, but things become complicated when he has to balance out his job as manager of the barbershop and leading sportscast anchor at his news job. Unfortunately, after he fouls up an interview with R&B artist Anthony Hamilton, he gets fired, forcing Flex to have a permanent job at the barbershop. Meanwhile, Duane, Breanna, Arnaz, and Spirit start a fashion business, and decide to sell their latest fashions to the students at McKinkley High School for a high price. Guest Star: Anthony Hamilton (as himself)
58	13	"East Meets East Coast"	Maynard C. Vigil	Erica Montolfo-Bura	January 27, 2004	3.39
The Korean shop-owner next to Flex's barbershop raises unexpected objections when his daughter begins a mini romance with Flex. Breanna teams up with Nyghtmare for a chemistry project. Flex doesn't approve, but realizes he's just like him when he was a teenager, so he decides to let them date. Guest Star: Omarion (as Nyghtmare)
59	14	"It's a Mad, Mad, Mad, Mad Hip Hop World"	Ken Whittingham	Lee House	February 10, 2004	2.76
Breanna, Arnaz, and Spirit plan to drive all the way to West Virginia to the Hip-Hop Palooza. Breanna tries to get Flex's permission to go there all by herself, but instead, Flex decides to tag along and make it a memorable family memory for her. On the road, Flex annoys them with road trip games, and the kids quickly get bored. The car runs out of gas, and Flex decides to go look for a gas station out alone while the kids are asleep. When Breanna, Spirit, and Arnaz wake up and discover Flex gone, they think that he has abandoned them. They are stranded on the road until Angie Stone pulls up with her limo and decides to give them a lift. Meanwhile, at a restaurant, Flex tries to contact the kids, but fails. Eventually, Breanna and Flex are reunited. Unfortunately, the Hip-Hop Palooza gets canceled because of a heavy downpour, but Breanna thanks Flex anyway for giving her a good family memory to reflect on. Also, Duane and Candy try to go a whole entire weekend without sex to find out what they have in common. Guest Stars: Angie Stone (as herself), Avant (as himself), Eve (as a waitress), Floetry (as themselves)
60	15	"The Catch"	Leonard R. Garner Jr.	Rod J. Emelle	February 24, 2004	3.19
Breanna and Spirit hold auditions for a new cheerleader on their cheerleading squad. So far, all the people who try out suck, except for one girl who just recently moved to Baltimore and transferred to McKinley. Her name is Charlotte and not only does she make the squad, but she and Breanna quickly become friends. While getting to know each other, Charlotte tells Spirit and Breanna that even though she just moved to Baltimore, she was still here over the summer visiting her grandmother. Charlotte also mentions that during the summer, she met a guy and had sex with him. Breanna and Spirit get really curious and ask her who and she says Arnaz! When Breanna discovers that she's the girl that Arnaz lost her virginity to, this makes Breanna mad, putting a dent in her new friendship with Charlotte. The next few days, Breanna starts to treat her really cruelly, but Spirit knocks some sense into Breanna by saying that she should really be mad at Arnaz. During the annual school cheer-off, Breanna and Charlotte make up. She also tells Breanna that even though she had sex with Arnaz, Arnaz had told her that there was already a special girl in his life who he had given a special half-heart locket to: Breanna. Meanwhile, Flex and Duane go up against each other for the condo board presidency. Flex tells Duane that since Flex is a "celebrity," he has no chance against Duane, but Duane gets a celebrity of his own to campaign him. Duane gets R&B star Ruben Studdard to sing to the voting committee board. Eventually, it turns out that both Flex and Duane lose, and the position goes to Ruben. Guest Stars: Ruben Studdard (as himself), Solange Knowles (as Charlotte)
61	16	"He's Not Heavy, He's My Half-Brother"	Mary Lou Belli	Kenny Smith Jr.	March 2, 2004	2.82
Duane's father returns for the kidney operation. When Duane goes to the hospital to get the kidney transplant, he discovers that his kidney's not going to his father, but instead to his half-brother he never even knew about, Dewayne. Duane is shocked by his existence and also discovers that while he was father-less his entire life, Dewayne was not and the only reason why Duane even got a chance to meet his real father is because Dewayne needed a kidney donor. Feeling left out and unloved, Duane runs away. Duane eventually comes back to the hospital, and Vaughn apologizes for not being a part of his life. Duane forgives him and accepts his half-brother. Meanwhile at WYNX, Flex lands a high-profile interview that is critical to his plans to go national, but he's blind-sided by his sexy co-host Holly, whose feminine wiles steal the interviewee away. Flex eventually gets jealous that Holly is attracting more viewers than him, but thanks to Breanna, he realizes that he has no reason to be jealous and that he and Holly make a great team. Also, Breanna receives many presents from her secret admirer. Arnaz gets jealous, and Spirit eventually discovers that Breanna is her own secret admirer. Breanna says she did it to show Arnaz that she's over him, but Spirit lets her know what the right thing to do is. The next day, Breanna sends herself one last note saying that it's over. Breanna then opens her locker and finds a whole bunch of flowers from her other secret admirer. Spirit says she thought Breanna stopped doing that, but she says she did, and it turns out Arnaz gave her those flowers. Guest Stars: Orlando Brown (as Dewayne), Smokey Robinson (as Vaughn Odell Knox)
62	17	"Spy Games Reloaded"	Ken Whittingham	Eric Lev	March 30, 2004	2.70
Flex lets Breanna stay at home alone, for two reasons: 1- It's her last chance and 2- To look after Duane who is recovering from his surgery. Arnaz spills grape soda on Flex's new expensive chair, then Spirit's stain removal material burns a hole in the cushion, so the three teens sell some of their stuff to make the money to buy a new chair. They raise the money, but accidentally sell Flex's flat screen television. Duane, who was given $10000 by his dad as thanks for the kidney, decides to give the kids the money for the TV, but as long as they look after him.
63	18	"Cabin Fever"	Mary Lou Belli	Kevin G. Boyd	April 6, 2004	1.86
Flex becomes jealous when Breanna starts to admire her drama teacher more than him. He gets so jealous that he goes to McKinley High School just to tell the teacher off, but because of a huge snowstorm, he, Breanna and the entire school get snowed in. Meanwhile, because of the snowstorm, Duane is the only one left in the building, so he tries to find ways to entertain himself. Flex's father comes back from a trip and helps Flex out with his jealousy.
64	19	"Sleepless in Baltimore"	Ken Whittingham	MaLyssa Scott	April 27, 2004	2.16
When Breanna secretly goes online to find her dad a date, she believes she has found his perfect match in Pamela, but she is shocked to discover that Flex and Pamela had dated 10 years earlier and, to make matters worse, Flex has no memory of ditching her the first time.
65	20	"No More Wire Hangers"	Leonard R. Garner Jr.	Eric Lev & Kenny Smith Jr.	May 4, 2004	2.80
Flex finds Arnaz in Breanna's room. Arnaz tells Flex that his home life isn't good because his mother Cheryl's drinking has gotten out of control. After talking, Flex decides to call Cheryl to come to Duane's apartment. After the talk, Breanna and Arnaz come in and Cheryl tries to take Arnaz home, but Arnaz refuses, calling her "drunk," and Cheryl slaps Arnaz. Cheryl tries to explain to Arnaz, but Breanna takes Arnaz to her house, Cheryl being taken home by Duane. The next day at school, Breanna tells the school counselor about Arnaz's mom's drinking. The counselor comes with her and Spirit to her office. Cheryl comes to Flex's house to apologize about what she did, and Flex tells her to pay for her drinking. At school, the counselor hosts an Alanon meeting in the gym. Arnaz is mad about the meeting at first, but as he tries to leave, his friends beg him to stay. After talking about drinking, Cheryl comes to school and apologizes for her behavior. She asks if she could join the meeting, and Arnaz lets her.
66	21	"The Prodigal Brother"	Leonard R. Garner Jr.	Eunetta T. Boone & Bennie R. Richburg Jr.	May 11, 2004	3.08
When his career as "hairdresser to the rap stars" ends abruptly, Flex's younger brother Kevin returns home hoping to take over the family barbershop, but after Flex sells it out from under him, he agrees to let Kevin stay on as manager. Later, Flex and Kevin team up to confront Kevin's former employer, a gangster rapper, in order to get the money he owes Kevin. Meanwhile, after Flex grounds her, Breanna tries hard not to break her punishment. NOTE: This episode sets up the following episode as a backdoor pilot to the spin-off series Cuts.
67	22	"Splitting Hairs/Phatheadz"	Leonard R. Garner Jr.	Eunetta T. Boone & Bennie R. Richburg Jr.	May 18, 2004	2.51
When hair-care mogul Jack Sherwood buys the family barbershop from Flex, Kevin is forced to co-manage the place with the new owner's spoiled daughter Tiffany, but they immediately butt heads over their different views of how the salon should be run. Later, Kevin and Tiffany agree to incorporate both of their ideas under one roof, making the shop a place where men can hang out, watch sports and have a beer all while getting a haircut, and at the same time be an urban oasis for women and men, where they can offer massages, highlights and lattes made to order. NOTE: This episode serves as a backdoor pilot to the spin-off series Cuts.
68	23	"The Play's the Thing"	Brian K. Roberts	Eunetta T. Boone	May 25, 2004	2.48
When "The Flex Files" has a chance of going national, their producer Geraldine convinces Flex and his co-host Holly to fake a romance in order to generate publicity and secure syndication, but things get complicated when Holly starts to have real feelings for Flex. Meanwhile, after learning that Arnaz has decided to move to New York, a devastated Breanna uses her broken heart to deliver an emotional performance that lands her the lead in her high-school play.
69	24	"Bright Lights, Big City"	Brian K. Roberts	Eunetta T. Boone	May 25, 2004	2.54
When Holly finds out that Flex is not in love with her, she decides to get even by sabotaging their chances of getting syndicated, but after they make fools out of each other at the broadcast awards dinner, her plan backfires as they are offered a deal to go national. Meanwhile, when Flex chooses to attend the awards dinner instead of Brenna's play, she decides to follow her dreams and run away with Arnaz to New York. Meanwhile, Candy moves in with Duane, who is now trying to hide the fact that Big Sal's has closed down and he is now out of a job.

=== Season 4 (2004–05) ===
- This is Kelly Perine and Sicily Johnson's last season of the show.

No. overall	No. in season	Title	Directed by	Written by	Original release date	Viewers (millions)
70	1	"We'll Take Manhattan"	Ken Whittingham	Eunetta T. Boone	September 20, 2004	3.26
After sneaking off to NYC, Breanna, Spirit and Arnaz quickly learn that fame and fortune is hard work after spending the night in a grungy apartment with other starving artists and being forced to panhandle for money. While Duane, Joyce and Flex drive all night to New York to find their kids, Arnaz makes a decision for his future.
71	2	"Zen Daddy"	Brian K. Roberts	Dan Cross & David Hoge	September 27, 2004	3.43
When an accident to Flex's co-host puts his syndication deal in jeopardy, Flex comes up with a great idea to have a sports show with his buddies, but before he has a chance to pitch the concept, he finds himself forced to take on his boss's new Croatian girlfriend as his new sidekick. Breanna tries to adjust to the fact that Arnaz decided to stay in New York and tries to move on in time for her senior year.
72	3	"Follow That Car"	Ken Whittingham	Bill Boulware	October 4, 2004	4.11
When Breanna and Arnaz admit to Flex that they are dating, he pretends to be happy about it, but really can't handle it, so he goes to great lengths to keep an eye on them, even going so far as to place a locator chip in Breanna's car to track her every move.
73	4	"Dirty Laundry"	Brian K. Roberts	Susan Nirah Jaffee	October 11, 2004	3.34
Breanna and Flex decide to see the new attractive family therapist who has moved into their building.
74	5	"Rock the Vote"	Ken Whittingham	Bennie R. Richburg Jr.	October 18, 2004	3.62
Breanna, excited to take part in the political process, ends up leading a McKinley High protest against her cousin.
75	6	"Manic Monday"	Ken Whittingham	Erica Montolfo-Bura	October 25, 2004	3.51
During Halloween, Flex and Breanna are put under a mysterious spell, causing them to inexplicably switch bodies and forcing them to see each other's point of view, so Breanna (as Flex) must pull off an interview with Olympic Gold Medal swimmer Gary Hall Jr., while Flex (as Breanna) must deliver a convincing performance in her drama class.
76	7	"You Don't Have to Go Home..."	Ken Whittingham	Devon Shepard	November 8, 2004	3.41
When Miss Swain finds out that Arnaz is using school as his home, Arnaz turns to his father for help. So when his dad can not help, his dad puts him to work at the family business at the "Crab in a Barrel."
77	8	"Daddy's Home"	Ken Whittingham	Eric Lev	November 15, 2004	3.54
When Arnaz hires a sexy back up singer for his band, Breanna is full of envy, because she thinks that Arnaz may have a passion for more than just the music.
78	9	"Who Brought the Jive Turkey?"	Maynard C. Vigil	Susan Watanabe	November 22, 2004	3.04
Breanna plans a perfect romantic Thanksgiving dinner for Arnaz and her, but it later turns sour when his friends show up. Meanwhile, Flex wants to have a nice dinner with his neighbor Danielle, but Flex accidentally stumbles upon a support group for singles, all of whom have dated Flex.
79	10	"Lost in the Headlights"	Brian K. Roberts	Lee House	November 29, 2004	3.48
Breanna wants to stuff her bra so she could appear in a national commercial at a movie-themed restaurant, where women with large breasts are the main attraction.
80	11	"Mojo No Mo"	Maynard C. Vigil	MaLyssa Scott	December 13, 2004	2.87
When Flex and Duane find themselves with no plans on New Year's Eve, they devise a plan to win dates at a charity auction. Meanwhile, Breanna is disappointed when Arnaz decides to take a gig on New Year's Eve instead of spending it with her.
81	12	"Shock Jock"	Chip Hurd	Dan Cross & David Hoge	January 3, 2005	3.36
After making some comments on his show "The Flex Files," Flex jeopardizes Breanna's chances of getting college scholarships from some organizations, who think Flex is a pig. Also, Duane secretly sells the uniforms that Spirit made for him as a favor.
82	13	"Goodbye, Mr. Chips"	Mary Lou Belli	Ray "Cory" Daniels	January 31, 2005	2.95
Flex brings Duane with him to the annual celebrity poker tournament, where Flex plays against Kevin Frazier (as himself). NBA legend John Salley and Claudia Jordan guest star as themselves.
83	14	"Lock Blockin'"	Maynard C. Vigil	Bennie R. Richburg Jr.	February 7, 2005	3.31
To get Flex out of a deep depression, Duane surprises Flex with an opportunity to sing with his favorite group, New Edition.
84	15	"Rock and a Hard Place"	Ken Whittingham	Devon Shepard	February 14, 2005	3.64
Arnaz has auditioned for a "Battle of the Bands" competition and is waiting until the scores get posted. Then A-Train (Lloyd Polite, Jr.) appears and says that he will lose against his group. Then Arnaz makes a joke about his name, and A-Train says that at least he has a nickname. Spirit laughs, which catches the eye of A-Train, who asks what her name is. Meanwhile, Duane tells Flex that he wants to marry Candy. Flex doesn't like the idea because they just got back together. They have a minor "argument," which ends with Duane walking out the apartment. At Arnaz's band practice, Spirit gives him and his band new outfits, but he doesn't like them, saying that they look like "hip hop butlers." Spirit states that she was doing a friend a favor. So Spirit goes to A-Train's group and gives them the outfits she made for Arnaz, without Breanna and Arnaz knowing, which gets him jealous. Meanwhile, Flex and Duane go through "friends counseling." In the end, Arnaz's band wins The Battle of the Bands, and Arnaz apologizes to Spirit, who does not forgive him.
85	16	"Contract High"	Mary Lou Belli	Susan Nirah Jaffee	February 21, 2005	2.81
Flex gets frustrated with his co-star's favored treatment and hires a powerful agent (David Faustino), hoping to get what he believes he deserves. Meanwhile, Spirit decides to quit designing after someone else rips off her creations.
86	17	"Accidental Love (Part 1)"	Ken Whittingham	Bill Boulware	February 28, 2005	3.30
An epiphany following a car accident sends Flex back into the arms of his old girlfriend, Tonya (Tamala Jones), much to the dismay of his therapist, Danielle, who suddenly realizes that she has feelings for him.
87	18	"Accidental Love (Part 2)"	Ken Whittingham	Erica Montolfo-Bura	March 28, 2005	3.15
Flex tries his best to make things work with Tonya (guest star Tamala Jones), but that becomes more difficult when he learns Danielle's true feelings for him. Meanwhile, Breanna's obsession with being crowned "cutest couple" with Arnaz for her school yearbook causes a rift between them.
88	19	"Glug, Glug"	Alfonso Ribeiro	Eric Lev	May 2, 2005	2.78
When her boyfriend cancels their date for the senior party because she won't have sex with him, a depressed Spirit gets drunk on way to the event and misses all of the festivities. Meanwhile, Danielle and Candy are convinced they are being stood up by their dates with Flex and Duane, but unbeknownst to them, the guys are being held up at gunpoint by a man (Chingy) down on his luck.
89	20	"Save the First Dance"	Maynard C. Vigil	Lee House & Susan Watanabe	May 9, 2005	2.83
After Flex hurts Danielle's feelings by teasing her for being fat in high school, he tries to make it up to her by recreating the prom she never got to attend. Meanwhile, after agreeing to let Spirit design her prom dress, Breanna is furious when she shows up to the prom in the dream dress she wanted to wear.
90	21	"Cap and Frown"	Ken Whittingham	Shawnte McCall	May 16, 2005	3.33
With graduation quickly approaching, Flex's ex-wife Nicole (Tichina Arnold) convinces him to meddle in Breanna's love life, hoping she will choose a college in California over staying in Baltimore with Arnaz. Later, Arnaz tells Breanna that she should go to California to follow her dreams, but she thinks it's his way of breaking up with her.
91	22	"The Graduates"	Ken Whittingham	David Hoge & Dan Cross	May 23, 2005	3.23
Feeling guilty for meddling in Breanna's love life, Flex admits to her that he persuaded Arnaz to let her go to California without him. Later, Breanna's plans for college take a surprising turn when she announces to Flex that she is living in Baltimore with Arnaz. Note: This episode marks the final appearance of Kelly Perine as Duane Odell Knox and Sicily Johnson as Spirit Jones. Note: This episode marks the final appearance of Flex Alexander as a main cast member.

=== Season 5 (2005–06) ===
- Jonathan Chase, Ray J. Norwood, Nicole Paggi and Camille Mana join the cast.
- Flex Alexander, Kelly Perine and Sicily Johnson are no longer part of the main cast.
- Flex Alexander makes a guest appearance in six episodes.

No. overall	No. in season	Title	Directed by	Written by	Original release date	Viewers (millions)
92	1	"One on One Remix"	Alfonso Ribeiro	Eunetta T. Boone	September 19, 2005	3.52
After last season's finale where Breanna decided to stay in California and go to college with Arnaz behind her, this season starts off with them searching for a place to live. Breanna and Arnaz move to California to pursue their dreams and find four new roommates. Special guest star: Flex Alexander as Flex Washington Note: Flex Alexander's character as Flex Washington was credited as a recurring character for the rest of this season. Note: Ray J. Norwood as Darrell "D-Mack" McGinty, Jonathan Chase as Cash Began, Camille Mana as Lisa Sanchez & Nicole Paggi as Sarah Crawford joins the cast. Note: Ray J. Norwood, Jonathan Chase, Camille Mana, Nicole Paggi join the cast. Flex Alexander will only appear in six episodes.
93	2	"Money's Tight and So Are My Abs"	Alfonso Ribeiro	Eric Lev	September 26, 2005	3.50
In an attempt to make some more money so Breanna won't have to be so dependent on her dad, Arnaz hits the boardwalk, but he finds it's easier to make money showing off his body than as a musician. Special guest star: Flex Alexander as Flex Washington
94	3	"House Dad"	Alfonso Ribeiro	Eric Lev	October 3, 2005	3.13
Flex becomes the House Dad and soon annoys everyone with his fatherly love. When the housemates decide to make Flex their new 'house dad', Breanna is annoyed. Special guest star: Flex Alexander as Flex Washington
95	4	"Static Clingy"	Ken Whittingham	Dan Cross & David Hoge	October 10, 2005	3.63
Arnaz and Breanna have a night out with their respective friends. Arnaz and Breanna spend time away from each other on a boys' and girls' night out.
96	5	"Study Buddy"	Alfonso Ribeiro	Michelle Listenbee Brown	October 17, 2005	3.50
Arnaz becomes jealous when Breanna spends a lot of time studying for her exams with D-Mack.
97	6	"Where's My Yemmy?"	Maynard C. Vigil	Eric Lapidus	October 24, 2005	3.32
Halloween episode. A Halloween party creates stress for Arnaz when he accidentally kisses a girl dressed up like Breanna. Meanwhile, Manny claims that his child actor award has been stolen. Guest Stars: Emmanuel Lewis.
98	7	"Who's the Boss?"	Alfonso Ribeiro	Bill Boulware	November 7, 2005	3.09
Arnaz and Breanna's relationship becomes strained when Breanna begins to work at the coffee shop with Arnaz, only to be promoted over him as his boss. Note: The title on this episode is the same as to the season 1 episode of Living Single.
99	8	"Venice Boulevard of Broken Dreams"	Maynard C. Vigil	Susan Nirah Jaffee	November 14, 2005	2.99
Breanna thinks she is getting her big break when she is cast as an extra in a film, but the director decides to offer Arnaz a speaking part instead. Guest Star: Kadeem Hardison
100	9	"One On One, One Oh Oh"	Maynard C. Vigil	Eunetta T. Boone	November 21, 2005	3.37
Breanna finally makes the big decision to have sex with Arnaz when she thinks she will lose him to another girl. Things get complicated when her father Flex makes an unexpected visit. Special guest star: Flex Alexander as Flex Washington
101	10	"Waiting for Huffman"	Leonard R. Garner Jr.	Lee House	November 28, 2005	3.03
Breanna is caught between a rock and a hard place as Cash takes photos of her new boss. Meanwhile, Arnaz is excited about a record producer at the Blog. Breanna becomes disillusioned when she learns the real reason that she was hired: to assist a famous daytime talk show host. Guest Stars: Jackée Harry as Sherri St. Croix and Bobby V as himself Special guest star: Flex Alexander as Flex Washington
102	11	"It's Beginning to Look a Lot Like Venice?"	Mary Lou Belli	Lisa Muse Bryant & Chanel Sartor	December 12, 2005	3.43
Stuck in Los Angeles for the holidays, Breanna and Arnaz try to get their roommates into the Christmas spirit whether they like it or not. Guest Stars: Eric Payne as Man
103	12	"Missing the Daddy Express"	Alfonso Ribeiro	Joe Rubin & George B. White III	January 16, 2006	2.48
Breanna parties too much and starts to fall behind in classes. When Breanna's grades begin to suffer, Flex pays her a visit to see what is going on. Guest-star: Saskia Garel as Danielle. Special guest star: Flex Alexander as Flex Washington Note: This episode marks the final appearance of Flex Alexander as Flex Washington.
104	13	"Fame and the Older Woman"	Chip Hurd	Michelle Listenbee Brown	February 6, 2006	3.06
D-Mack goes out with his French professor and is stunned when she kisses him; Breanna prepares for the opening night in a Shakespearean play, but is disappointed when Arnaz can't come.
105	14	"Espresso Your Love"	Chip Hurd	Susan Nirah Jaffee	February 13, 2006	2.47
Breanna and Arnaz learn they are complete opposites after taking a compatibility test on Valentine's Day. Sara launches a dating service.
106	15	"Tijuana Break Up?"	Art Manke	Eric Lev	February 20, 2006	3.02
As Breanna and Arnaz decide to take a break from their relationship, things get uncomfortable when D-Mack's sister Michelle shows up and makes a connection with Arnaz, causing Breanna to become jealous. Meanwhile, the stubborn roommates can't decide whose turn it is to go shopping, so instead of giving in, they hoard whatever food and coffee they have for themselves. Guest star: Brandy as Michelle
107	16	"Dump Me? Dump You!"	Maynard C. Vigil	Dan Cross & David Hoge	February 27, 2006	3.03
Things turn ugly when the roommates twist Arnaz and Breanna's amicable break-up into a fight over who dumped whom, and making matters worse, Arnaz and Michelle start spending time together, leading a jealous Breanna to confront Michelle to find out what she really wants with Arnaz. Meanwhile, after seeing Arnaz's passion for music, Michelle realizes she must follow her own dreams and enlists her brother D-Mack's help in dealing with their parents. Guest star: Brandy as Michelle
108	17	"Recipe for Disaster"	Katy Garretson	Jeffrey Duteil	March 27, 2006	2.82
Breanna uses a girl named Alica to prove that she is over Arnaz at a party. However she realizes that she isn't over him just yet. Guest Stars: Chris Brown as himself
109	18	"The Reel World"	Katy Garretson	Devon Shepard	April 17, 2006	2.30
Cash attempts to make a movie based on his roommates' lives; he gets more than he asked for when Breanna attempts to re-write their roles. But when Cash insists on sticking to the original script, she leads the whole cast off the set.
110	19	"California Girl"	Alfonso Ribeiro	Stacey Evans Morgan	April 24, 2006	2.22
When Arnaz decides to spend a weekend away with his new girlfriend Rachel, he is disappointed when he discovers that Breanna has planned a girls weekend with Lisa and Sara at the same place.
111	20	"Double Trouble"	Ken Whittingham	Eric Lapidus	May 1, 2006	2.34
Ready to enter the dating world, Breanna changes her rules about bringing dates back to the house, but when Arnaz shows up with his new girlfriend, Breanna regrets her decision. Meanwhile, Breanna's uncle Kevin and his protégé Darius come to Los Angeles to build his KevCare hair-care line and enlist the roommates to help sell the products.
112	21	"I Love L.A. (Part 1)"	Craig Wyrick-Solari	Story by : Christopher Barbers; Teleplay by : Lee House	May 8, 2006	2.43
Michelle returns as Breanna wants to take her relationship with Calvin further. Cash does a photo shoot and isn't too happy with the results.
113	22	"I Love L.A. (Part 2)"	Howard Ritter	Bill Boulware	May 15, 2006	2.94
Calvin confronts Breanna about her feelings for Arnaz as she and D-Mack deal with Michelle and Arnaz being seen together. Sara discovers the truth about her boyfriend, Andrew, and Lisa finds a new love interest in Benjamin. D-Mack ends up kissing Breanna, and in the end they wind up sleeping together.
