= It's a Miserable Life =

It's a Miserable Life may refer to:

== Television ==
- "It's a Miserable Life (The Golden Girls)", an episode of the sitcom The Golden Girls
- "It's a Miserable Life (Beavis and Butt-head)", an episode of the animated series Beavis and Butt-head
- "It's a Miserable Life (One on One)", an episode of the sitcom One on One
- "It's a Miserable Life (Freddy's Nightmares)", an episode of the horror series Freddy's Nightmares

== Other uses ==
- It's a Miserable Life, a novel based on the television adaptation of Sabrina the Teenage Witch by Cathy East Dubowski

== See also ==
- It's a Wonderful Life (disambiguation)
