= Judy Smith =

American crisis manager, lawyer, author, and TV producer (born 1958)

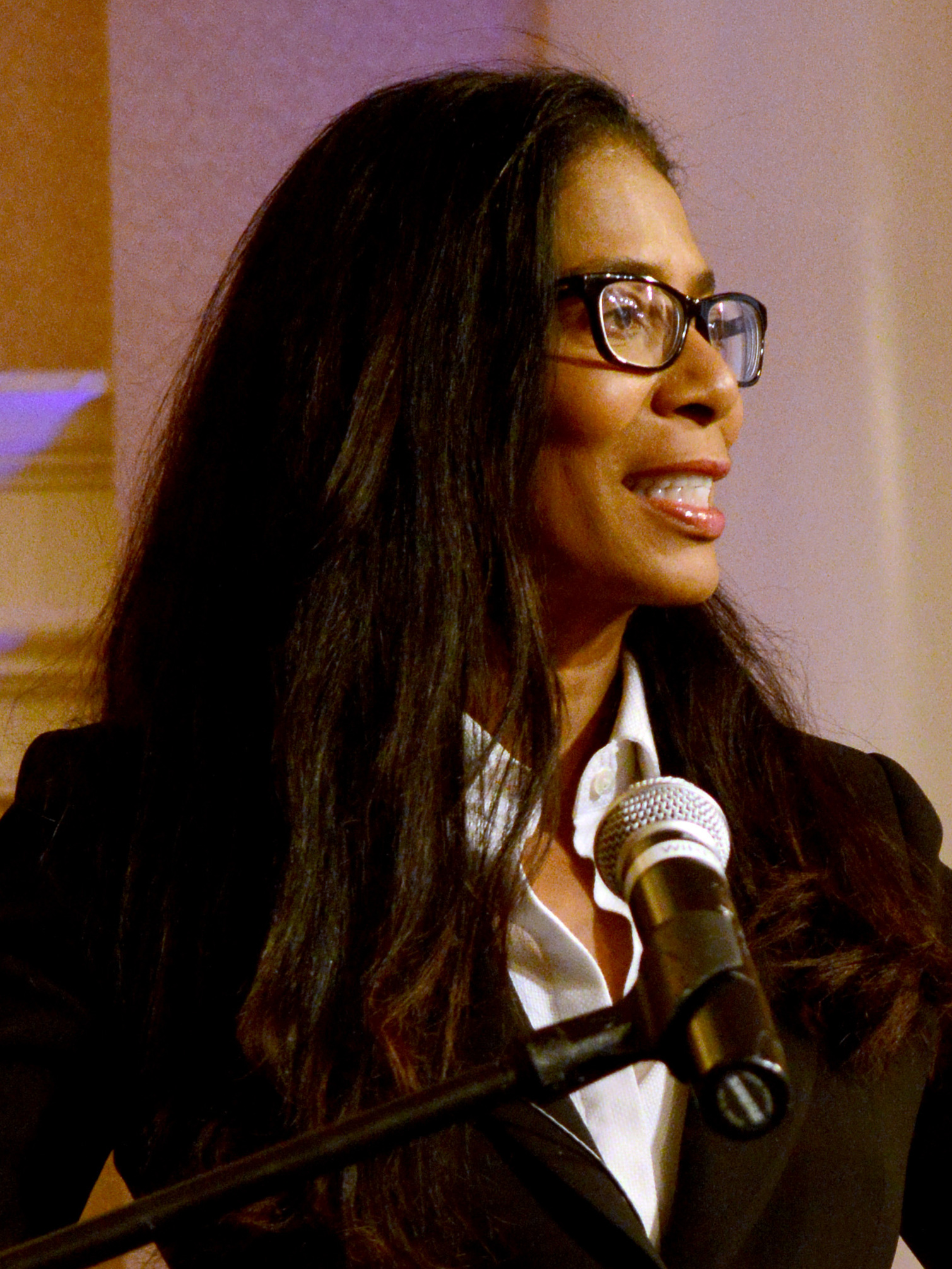
- Smith speaking at Roanoke College in 2014
- Born: October 27, 1958 (age 68); Washington, D.C., U.S.
- Education: Boston University (BS); American University (JD)
- Occupations: Crisis manager, PR manager, TV producer, author
- Spouse: Bill Boulware
- Website: www.judysmith.com

Judy A. Smith (born October 27, 1958) is an American crisis manager, lawyer, author, and television producer. She is known as the founder, president, and CEO of the crisis management firm Smith & Company. Her work in crisis management is the inspiration for the ABC television series Scandal.

== Early life and education ==
Smith was born on October 27, 1958, in Washington, D.C. She attended St. Francis de Sales Elementary School and the Academy of Notre Dame. Following high school, she attended Boston University and graduated with a Bachelor of Science degree in public relations. She later enrolled at American University and graduated with a J.D. degree from the American University Washington College of Law. She was the first African-American woman to serve as executive editor of the American University Law review. In May 2013, Smith delivered the commencement address to the Boston University College of Communication Class of 2013, alongside the commencement student speaker, Cody Brotter. On July 10, 2016, Smith became an honorary member of Alpha Kappa Alpha. She is married to Bill Boulware.

== Career ==
=== Public service ===
Smith began working in public service in 1983, when she was employed as assistant editor for the Nurses Association of the American College of Obstetricians and Gynecologists in Washington, D.C. After her graduation from American University in 1987, she became Deputy Director of Public Information and Associate Counsel in the Office of the Independent Counsel. In 1989, she was appointed Special Counsel to the U.S. Attorney for the District of Columbia, serving as principal adviser to the U.S. Attorney on media relations and chief spokeswoman.

Starting March 7, 1991, Smith served as Special Assistant and Deputy Press Secretary to President George H. W. Bush. While there, she earned a reputation for being straightforward, honest and hard working. She was reportedly instrumental in guiding the Bush administration through the controversies surrounding the nomination of Clarence Thomas to the Supreme Court.

=== Crisis management ===
After leaving the White House staff, Smith started Smith & Company, a consulting firm specializing in crisis management and media relations. Her firm has advised clients that include Monica Lewinsky, actor Wesley Snipes, NFL quarterback Michael Vick and Sony Pictures Entertainment after their 2014 cyber attack.

=== Television ===
After her work for President Bush, Smith worked for NBC as vice president of communications, where she was responsible for news, sports and entertainment shows. In 2009, Smith was introduced to Shonda Rhimes, creator of the TV series Grey's Anatomy, and her partner Betsy Beers, a co-executive producer. That meeting was scheduled for less than half an hour but went on for more than three, resulting in the development of the political thriller television series Scandal, which is inspired by Smith's professional background in public relations and crisis management work in Washington D.C. As of 2012, Smith serves as co-executive producer and technical advisor for the show.

=== Author ===
Smith writes blogs for the Huffington Post and ABC television. Her blog, titled Ask Judy, is a feature of the Huffington Post, where she is listed among the Black Voices. In tandem with her role at ABC, she writes a blog titled What Would Judy Do? for each episode of the television series Scandal.

Smith's first book, Good Self, Bad Self, was released on April 3, 2012, to generally good reviews. Kirkus Reviews summarized a review by stating, "Smith provides a good overview of how to identify and curtail egregious behavior, with just enough celebrity misbehavior to hold the reader's attention." Publishers Weekly was less enthusiastic, concluding that her "approach feels unwieldy and better suited to accompany her services as a crisis manager than as a do-it-yourself program".

== Published works ==
- Smith, Judy (2012). Good Self, Bad Self: Transforming Your Worst Qualities into Your Biggest Assets, Free Press, 288 pages. ISBN 978-1451649994
- Smith, Judy (2013). Good Self, Bad Self: How to Bounce Back from a Personal Crisis, Free Press, 272 pages. ISBN 978-1451650006
