= Drexell's Class =

American sitcom

- Genre: Sitcom
- Created by: Andrew Nicholls; Darrell Vickers
- Written by: Bill Boulware; Eric Brand; Ralph R. Farquhar; Jim Herzfeld; Phil Kellard; Wayne Kline; Robert Kurtz; Tom Moore; Andrew Nicholls; Darrell Vickers; George Zateslo
- Directed by: Matthew Diamond; Dick Martin; Gino Tanasescu; John Tracy
- Starring: Dabney Coleman
- Theme music composer: Kurt Farquhar
- Composers: Rich Eames; Scott Gale
- Country of origin: United States
- Original language: English
- No. of seasons: 1
- No. of episodes: 18

Production
- Executive producers: Phil Kellard; Tom Moore; David A. Neuman
- Producer: Marsha Posner-Williams
- Running time: 30 minutes
- Production companies: Grantwood Productions; 20th Century Fox Television

Original release
- Network: Fox
- Release: September 19, 1991 – March 5, 1992

Drexell's Class is an American sitcom that aired Thursday at 8:30 on Fox as part of its 1991–92 lineup. The show was created by Andrew Nicholls and Darrell Vickers.

== Synopsis ==
Dabney Coleman is Otis Drexell, a fifth-grade teacher at fictional Grantwood Elementary School in Cedar Bluffs, Iowa. Drexell was a divorced father living with his two daughters, the boy crazy Melissa (A. J. Langer), who dated happy, dim-witted Slash (Phil Buckman), and the levelheaded, mature Brenda (Brittany Murphy). His sarcastic, cynical and manipulative ways made it easier to deal with his class. Drexell's backstory revealed he was a corporate raider who lost a large amount of money on a failed venture, dodged his taxes, and was arrested. At his sentencing, he was offered a suspended sentence if he served as a teacher at the understaffed school to pay off his back taxes. The cast also included two antagonists, the smug rival teacher Roscoe Davis (Dakin Matthews), who enjoyed putting Drexell down, claiming he had a better class of students, and principal Francine Itkin (Randy Graff), who thought Drexell was incompetent and couldn't control his class. Itkin later had a nervous breakdown and was replaced by shrewd principal Marylin Ridge (Edie McClurg).

One of Drexell's few friends was P.E. teacher George Foster (Cleavant Derricks), who shared Drexell's love of sports and beer. Early episodes focused on Drexell's unwillingness to teach his students lessons by the book, while later episodes focused more on his life outside of school and his attempts to be a good father. On one occasion, Drexell's ex-wife made an appearance; Drexell hoped she would remarry so he could stop paying alimony.

== Cast ==
- Dabney Coleman as Otis Drexell
- Randy Graff as Principal Francine E. Itkin
- Dakin Matthews as Roscoe Davis
- Jason Biggs as Willie Trancas
- Heidi Zeigler as Nicole Finnigan
- Damian Cagnolatti as Kenny Sanders
- Matthew Lawrence as Walker
- A. J. Langer as Melissa Drexell
- Brittany Murphy as Brenda Drexell
- Edie McClurg as Principal Marilyn Ridge
- Cleavant Derricks as George Foster
- Phil Buckman as Slash
- Jacqueline Donnelly as Bernadette
- Matthew Slowik as Lionel

== Episodes ==
No.	Title	Directed by	Written by	Original release date	Prod. code
1	"Otis' Last Day"	Matthew Diamond	Andrew Nicholls & Darrell Vickers	September 19, 1991	8G03
2	"Air Drexell"	Matthew Diamond	Phil Kellard & Tom Moore	September 26, 1991	8G02
3	"Misery Loves Drexell"	Matthew Diamond	Andrew Nicholls & Darrell Vickers	October 3, 1991	8G04
4	"Love Walked Right In and Swept Mr. Drexell Away"	Matthew Diamond	Dennis Klein	October 10, 1991	8G05
5	"Convictions"	Matthew Diamond	Ralph Farquhar	October 17, 1991	8G01
6	"Viva Lost Wages"	Matthew Diamond	Phil Kellard & Tom Moore & Ralph Farquhar	October 24, 1991	8G07
7	"Best Halloween Ever"	Matthew Diamond	Wayne Kline	October 31, 1991	8G06
8	"Driving Drexell Crazy"	Matthew Diamond	Andrew Nicholls & Darrell Vickers	November 7, 1991	8G08
9	"Down and Out at the Out 'n In"	Matthew Diamond	Andrew Nicholls & Darrell Vickers	November 14, 1991	8G10
10	"The Best Thanksgiving Ever"	Matthew Diamond	Andrew Nicholls & Darrell Vickers	November 21, 1991	8G09
11	"Bully for Otis"	Matthew Diamond	Andrew Nicholls & Darrell Vickers	December 5, 1991	8G11
12	"Silent Night, Holy Smokes"	Matthew Diamond	Bill Boulware	December 12, 1991	8G12
13	"My Own Private Iowa"	Matthew Diamond	Eric Brand & Robert Kurtz	January 16, 1992	8G13
14	"Beauty and the Beast"	Dick Martin	Bill Boulware	January 23, 1992	8G14
15	"Ashes to Ashes"	Matthew Diamond	George Zateslo	February 6, 1992	8G17
16	"Till Death Do You Part"	Gino Tanasescu	George Zatelso	February 13, 1992	8G15
17	"Cruisin'"	Matthew Diamond	Bill Boulware	February 20, 1992	8G18
18	"The Resentments"	Matthew Diamond	Wayne Kline	March 5, 1992	8G16

== Awards and nominations ==
Year	Award	Title of work	Recipient
1991	Young Artist Awards	Outstanding Young Ensemble Cast in a Television Series	–
1991	Young Artist Awards	Best Young Actor Guest Starring or Recurring Role in a TV Series	Michael Oliver
1991	Young Artist Awards	Best Young Actor Guest Starring or Recurring Role in a TV Series	Brandon Quintin Adams

== In popular culture ==
- The Simpsons made light of the show's cancellation in their 1992 "Treehouse of Horror III" episode with a "graveyard of cancelled shows". A tombstone of Drexell's Class is featured alongside tombstones of Fish Police, Capitol Critters, and Family Dog.
- An early episode of the show had a montage of historically accurate flags, from the Red Ensign of Colonial America and showing how the American flag changed, with the current 50-star flag marked "1991" followed by the flag of Japan marked "2000". This had been criticized by Asian-American groups and the Veterans of Foreign Wars who considered that to be a joke in poor taste.
- Tupac Shakur and Digital Underground appeared and performed on the show in a cameo appearance.
