= Gary Shimokawa =

American director and producer (born 1942)

- Born: Gary Kango Shimokawa; February 13, 1942 (age 84); Los Angeles County, California, U.S.
- Education: University of Southern California (BA)
- Occupations: Television/Film director and producer
- Years active: 1972–present
- Notable work: Archie Bunker's Place; The Golden Girls; All in the Family; Night Court; Mister T

Gary K. Shimokawa (born February 13, 1942) is an American director and producer. He is best known for directing the sitcoms Archie Bunker's Place, Night Court and The Golden Girls. He has directed and produced over 40 shows and movies, and won the Peabody Award.

== Biography ==
Shimokawa was born in Los Angeles in 1942. He is of Japanese descent; he and his family were interned at Manzanar shortly after his birth following the attack on Pearl Harbor and signing of Executive Order 9066.

Before venturing into Hollywood films and TV, Shimokawa taught on the junior high and high school level in Los Angeles, and wrote on the Gardena Valley News, a local bi-weekly paper, as the Sports and Entertainment editor. In television, he has directed and produced shows for over 35 years (primarily half-hour multi-cam comedy shows for prime-time and cable) totaling over 600 episodes. He also co-wrote a comedy pilot for Nickelodeon cable TV network. Shimowaka holds a Bachelor of Arts degree from University of Southern California (USC) in Comparative Literature.

Shimokawa also served as an adjunct professor at USC for two years in the graduate film and television program and was also an adjunct professor at LMU in undergraduate television. He presently serves as a visiting professor at New York University's Kanbar Institute of Film & Television.

== Filmography ==
=== As director ===
- Welcome Back, Kotter (1976); Ep. "A Love Story"
- The Bay City Amusement Company (1977)
- Laverne & Shirley (1977); Ep. "Honeymoon Hotel"
- Another Day (1978); Ep. "A Couple Drinks With the Girls"
- Fish (1978); 8 Episodes
- Carter Country (1979); Ep. "The Russians Are Coming"
- Alice (TV series) (1980); Ep. "Carrie's Wedding"
- The Facts of Life (1980); Ep. "Molly's Holiday"
- Archie Bunker's Place (1980–83); 25 Episodes
- Mister T (1983–85); 30 Episodes
- Night Court (1984–85); 2 Episodes
- Down to Earth (1985); Ep. "Ethel's Memory Loss"
- What's Happening Now!! (1985–88); 4 Episodes
- Comedy Factory (1986); Ep. "Hearts of Steel"
- The Golden Girls (1986); Ep. "Second Motherhood"
- Sanchez of Bel Air (1986); 2 Episodes
- Nine to Five (1987–88); 14 Episodes
- ALF (1987–89); 13 Episodes
- Good Morning, Miss Bliss (1988–89); 5 Episodes
- Saved by the Bell (1989); 4 Episodes
- Normal Life (1990); Ep. "And Baby Makes..."
- Amen (1990–91); 3 Episodes
- Big Brother Jake (1990–92); 2 Episodes
- Sister, Sister (1995); Ep. "Christmas"
- Coach (1996); Ep. "We Can Never Die"
- Goode Behavior (1996); 23 Episodes
- Quick Witz (1996); Ep. "Pilot"
- USA High (1997); 3 Episodes
- Malibu, CA (1998); 3 Episodes
- Reba (2001); 3 Episodes
- Titus (2001–02); 8 Episodes
- One on One (2003); 4 Episodes
- Eve (2004); 3 Episodes
- Less Than Perfect (2004); Ep. "Claude's 15 Minutes of Christmas"
- Still Standing (2005); Ep. "Still Mother's Day"
- Cuts (2006); 2 Episodes
- Sherri (2009); Ep. "Thanks-for-Not-for-Nothing-Giving"

=== As Associate/Second Unit Director ===
- The Christmas Visit (1973)
- All in the Family (1973–77); 65 Episodes
- That's My Mama (1974); 3 Episodes
- Good Times (1975); 13 Episodes
- Welcome Back, Kotter (1975); Ep. "Welcome Back"
- Dorothy (1979); 3 Episodes
- The Facts of Life (1979–80); 3 Episodes
- Archie Bunker's Place (1980–82); 3 Episodes
- Night Court (1984–85); 28 Episodes
- Hail to the Chief (1985); Ep. "Pilot"
- The Golden Girls (1985–87); 39 Episodes
- Amen (1986); Ep. "Pilot"

=== As producer ===
- Mr. T and Tina (1976); 2 Episodes
- Count Basie at Carnegie Hall (1981)
- Living in TV Land (2006); Ep. "Sherman Hemsley"
- Lies I Told My Little Sister (2014)

=== Miscellaneous ===
- All in the Family (1972–73) as Stage Manager; 24 Episodes
- The Joker's Wild (1972–75) as Stage Manager; All Episodes
- The Actor's Journey (2011) as himself
- The Actor's Journey for Kids (2011) as himself
