= Seal Team (film) =

- Theatrical release poster
- Directed by: Greig Cameron; Kane Croudace
- Written by: Greig Cameron
- Story by: Brian Cleveland; Jason Cleveland; Wayne Thornley
- Produced by: Stuart Forrest; Mike Buckland; Jean-Michel Koenig; James Middleton; Anthony Silverston
- Starring: J. K. Simmons; Jessie T. Usher; Matthew Rhys; Patrick Warburton; Kristen Schaal; Sharlto Copley; Camille Mana; John Kani; Dolph Lundgren; Seal
- Edited by: Luke MacKay
- Music by: Elben Schutte; Andries Smit
- Production company: Triggerfish Animation Studios
- Distributed by: Netflix (streaming rights); Cinema Management Group
- Release dates: 13 October 2021 (Netherlands); 31 December 2021 (Netflix)
- Running time: 100 minutes
- Country: South Africa
- Language: English
- Budget: $23 million
- Box office: $905,428

Seal Team is a 2021 South African animated action comedy film co-directed by Greig Cameron and Kane Croudace, produced by Triggerfish Animation Studios and Cinema Management Group oversees worldwide distribution. The film stars the voices of J. K. Simmons, Jessie T. Usher, Matthew Rhys, Patrick Warburton, Kristen Schaal, Sharlto Copley, John Kani, Dolph Lundgren, and Seal. It tells the story of a group of misfit Cape Fur Seals who come together to fight a gang of ruthless sharks.

The film was released in cinemas in the Netherlands on 13 October 2021, followed by Belgium in 27 October, Czech Republic one day later, and in West Asian Arab countries on 4 November. Netflix acquired the rights for the film for release on 31 December of the same year in many other territories.

== Plot ==
During the 1980s near the Cape of Storms, an animal military unit called H.M.M.F. (Hydro Marine Military Force), consisting of two cape fur seals: veteran Claggart and tech genius Switch, and a striped dolphin named Dolph, are tasked by their human superiors with trying to defuse a naval mine. Due to a seal's color-blindness, Claggart ends up cutting the wrong wire, and the mine immediately blows up once hauled onto their ship, the Good Boy. This causes a portion of the ship to be destroyed and the ship to wrecked on a rock, while the H.M.M.F. all survive unscathed, though Claggart loses his name tags which drifts off to rest near Seal Island, an island endlessly full of seals. Over time, the now retired H.M.M.F. drift apart: Claggart stays behind on the wreck of the Good Boy, Switch goes insane and lives on his own wreck that he turns into a lab with his imaginary friend Senior Echo, and Dolph goes into show business in his own popular superhero show titled: Dial Eck-Eck-Eck-Eck For Action.

In the present day, Claggart's name tag is found by a bold cape fur seal named Quinn and his nervous best friend Benji while hunting for a fish, before they are chased off by sharks, whom their community lives in fear of, but their fear is always scoffed at by their elder leader, Brick. Due to the shortage of food, the seals are all forced to eat bad-tasting barnacles while having to wait for the annual sardine run. After retrieving the name tag, Quinn and Benji both share each of the name tags, and go out at night to search for food amongst the human shipwrecks with no luck, afoul of a great white shark named Grimes and his remora associates, who tries to eat them. Quinn manages to survive by hiding in the wreck, he calls for Benji to join him, but learns he has been eaten by Grimes after seeing his part of the name tag snagged on his teeth, who then goes for him next, but Quinn is then saved by an elderly Claggart, who drives off Grimes and brings him back to the surface and reclaims his name tag before leaving Quinn.

After he comes to, he is found by three cape gannets named Diving Dee, Roger, and Mayday, who has been trying to eat a starfish that has been stuck in her mouth for years, who guide him to the wreck of the Good Boy, where Quinn insist Claggart into teaching him how to fight a shark, which he had experienced him do that to Grimes before he passed out, so he can avenge Benji's death.

After some advice by Claggart to assemble a team in order to accomplish his goal, he returns to Seal Island, where he recruits the energetic but eccentric Beth, who prefers and suggests to licking rocks rather than eat barnacles, and the boastful yet cowardly Great Geraldo, who keeps telling everyone that comes his way about escaping an aquarium in Cape Town, but had to leave behind his Asian girlfriend Magnificent Jing. They arrive at the Good Boy where Claggart teaches them the skills they need to fight sharks and eventually they pass the final exam.

Later that night, after being convinced by Quinn, Claggart takes them to Switch's wreck, where he accepts the offer to join them and shows off his latest biotech weapons to help them, including snapping clam grenades, electric eel bolts, pufferfish mines, stolen synchronized watches (Geraldo instead gets a toy watch), barracuda bazookas, pistol shrimps (that shoots a blast of knockout gas when used), and a group of octopuses all named Flicka, who can all turn into a suit that makes anyone invisible. With their training and new weapons, they successfully take down a shark. Two onlooking sharks see this, and report to Grimes, who decides to make an example of them by using his remoras to summon all the sharks in the world, including the one that Quinn and his friends trapped.

The gannets tell the group of the situation, so Switch suggests using his special formula chum to hypnotize the sharks and lure them away from Seal Island, so they go to Cape Town to retrieve a boat in order to install the chum. Once there, Geraldo reunites with Jing who is ruling a group of harbor seals. She forces him to reveal that escaping the aquarium was Jing's idea that she escaped and left him behind due to the fact that he could not go through with it, and he was thrown out instead of escaping. After some convincing, Jing joins the team, as they acquire a boat and head back to Seal Island, where they use the chum to lure the sharks away from Seal Island and use the advantage to bombard the sharks with their weapons.

When the shark they fought attacks their boat, it crashes into a crevice where one of Grimes' remoras gets separated from the shark and take it hostage where they learn from it that surrounding Seal Island was a distraction to keep them busy while Grimes was gathering more shark forces. Geraldo and Jing stay behind to distract the sharks surrounding the boat wreck by tricking them with a play with fake replicas, in which they amend their ways before joining the others near Grimes' wreck to learn his true intentions.

With the help of Flicka, Quinn goes undercover and learns that Grimes is planning to lead an endless population of sharks to attack the Seal Island population on their south to the upcoming annual sardine run. However, Quinn's cover is compromised after Flicka's effects wear off but orders Flicka to activate their countermeasures who do it by covering the entire area of ink. In the commotion, Claggart abandons the others to keep the sharks busy, while the others escape. After arriving on the Good Boy, Quinn leaves for Seal Island, as he no longer wants to endanger his friends, but once he arrives, he learns all the seals have gone for the sardine run, he confronts Brick for mindlessly endangering them, but then the latter regrets that he already knows about sharks, because even though some seals will not come back, the community will survive, before leaving with the rest of the seals. Knowing that their fate is in his hands, Quinn returns to the Good Boy.

They arrive at Grimes' lair in a sunken oil tanker by sneaking inside the mouth of Dave, a goofy looking, loud-mouthed basking shark whom they frequently encounter. Once there, they assault all the sharks with ambushes, and they hide in a container, but they eventually escape, and manage to protect all the seals, who also lose their fear and join in the fight, along with Brick. They are also joined by Claggart, who is revealed to be alive and had gone to recruit Dolph for the team, who both restart the Good Boy, allowing a chance for the seals to escape on board. Grimes pounces onto the ship and snags Claggart's name tag on Quinn with the other name tag snagged on his tooth, resulting in a tug-of-war, but Quinn breaks free and retrieves both name tags, while Grimes falls back into the sea and is shredded to death by the Good Boy's propeller.

Six months later, Quinn and his friends have hauled the Good Boy to Seal Island as their new base, where the residents of Seal Island now honor them as heroes, and they, along with the gannets and Dave, keep the island safe from any seal-eating shark that comes by.

As the credits are rolling, Dave is seen as a caller on a talk show radio station, where continuously talks about the many objects he accidentally ate other than plankton to prove that not all sharks are dangerous as well as talking about a decorator crab with a knife and a team of seals.

== Cast ==
- Jessie T. Usher as Quinn, an orphaned cape fur seal.
- J. K. Simmons as Claggart, an elderly cape fur seal who comes out of retirement to lead the Seal Team.
- Matthew Rhys as Grimes, a villainous great white shark
- Patrick Warburton as Geraldo, a boastful yet cowardly cape fur seal that used to be in an aquarium.
- Kristen Schaal as Beth, an energetic, but eccentric female cape fur seal.
- Sharlto Copley as Switch, a mentally-unstable gadgets expert cape fur seal who has an imaginary friend named Senior Echo.
- Camille Mana as Jing, an Asian cape fur seal skilled in martial arts and Geraldo's former lover who escaped from the aquarium and ruled over the harbor seals in Cape Town.
- John Kani as Brick, a scarred old cape fur seal and the leader of the seals who keeps denying the existence of sharks.
- Dolph Lundgren as Dolph, a cigar-chomping striped dolphin with sunglasses whose catchphrase is "Eck eck eck eck! It's go time!"
- Seal as Seal Seal, a singing cape fur seal.
- Julian Smith as Benji, a cape fur seal and Quinn's best friend who gets killed by Grimes.
- Kate Micucci as Diving Dee, a fast-talking cape gannet.
- Anjali Bhimani as
  - Crabby Stabby, a decorator crab who carries around a knife threatening to stab people.
  - Female shark
- Richard Steven Horvitz as:
  - Snap, a sharp-tempered Mako shark.
  - Two of Grimes's remora fish.
- Jan Johns as:
  - Mayday, an insane cape gannet who has a starfish living in her mouth.
  - Geraldo's Watch
- Matthew Mercer as Dave, a loud-mouthed but friendly basking shark.
- Daran Norris as:
  - Roger, a cape gannet who usually just says "Roger".
  - Radio DJ
- Bumper Robinson as:
  - The HMMF Animal Handler of Claggert, Switch, and Dolph
  - One of Grimes's remora fish.
- Vivienne Rutherford as Sam
- Secunda Wood as Scarlet
- Jenny Yokobori as Geraldo's Watch
- Rick Zieff as Crunch, a dimwitted great white shark who hangs out with Snap and whose catchphrase is "Who wants to get in my face hole!?"
- Judy Abrahams as Guard
- Julia Anastasopolous as Tour Guide
- Zolani Mohala as Guard

The harbor seals of Cape Town voiced by Greig Cameron, Rob van Vurren, Louw Venter, and Tarryn Wyndgaard.

Additional octopus voices provided by Bob Bergen, Jan Johns, and Jenny Yokobori.

Additional seal voices provided by Bob Bergen, Anjali Bhimani, Greig Cameron, Remy Edgerly, Bill Farmer, Jan Johns, Jason E. Kelley, Neal Leachman, Brendan Sean Murray, Joe Ochman, Catherine Taber, Matthew Wood, and Jenny Yokobori.

Additional shark voices provided by Rodger Bumpass, Greig Cameron, Quinton Flynn, Jan Johns, Neal Leachman, Matthew Mercer, Kristina Mueller, Brent Mukai, Brendan Sean Murray, Sarah Natochenny, Ryan Robinson, Lindsey Sheppard, and Matthew Wood.

== Production ==
In 2018, Triggerfish Animation Studios began to produce Seal Team as their third feature film. The film was being financed by South Africa's Industrial Development Corporation, the Dept. of Trade and Industry (DTI), National Film & Video Foundation of South Africa, and Banc of California with worldwide sales by Cinema Management Group (CMG).

While the film was fully created at Triggerfish studios in Cape Town, some of the animation was outsourced to Base FX in Beijing and Johannesburg's Chocolate Tribe handled a portion of the rigging using Maya's mGear and Python tools to give the characters a stop-motion look on the movements.

Dolph Lundgren and Matthew Rhys joined the voice cast in May 2021. Rhys once mentioned that he wanted to voice Grimes because he has a 4-year-old son who is obsessed with sharks.

== Release ==
Seal Team, was initially given a limited theatrical release before becoming available globally on the streaming service Netflix on December 31st, 2021.

== Reception ==
=== Critical response ===
The New York Times gave it a negative review, claiming "the best cackle comes from reading the voice cameos in the end credits".

In contrast, Decider was more positive to the film. They said that the film "has laughs a-plenty and a sense of good natured camaraderie in its heart..." not to mention "inspired voice casting" and "the kind of sight gags that look beyond cartoon kids' fare".

Common Sense Media recommended it for ages six and older: "Though it doesn't have the big-name studios behind it, this movie holds its own in the animation and voice acting categories... You can't help but root for the seals".

The film Seal Team topped the top 10 list of the most-watched shows on Netflix in five continents and 27 countries.

== See also ==
- Seal Team Six
