= Shondrella Avery =

American actress, model and comedian

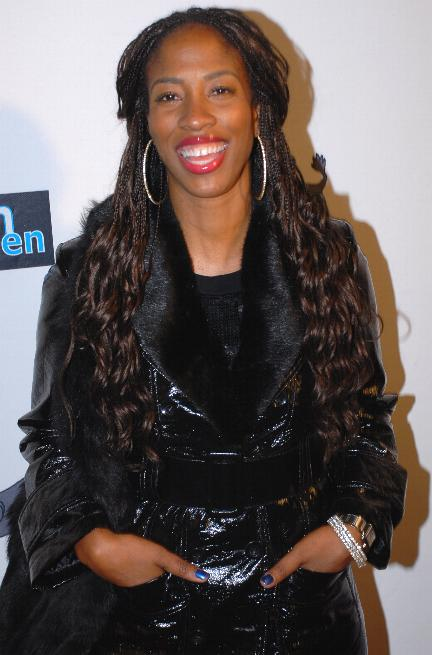
- Avery in December 2007
- Born: Shondrella Dupre Avery; Los Angeles, California, U.S.
- Education: California State University, Los Angeles
- Occupations: Actress, model, comedian
- Years active: 1997–present
- Spouse: Ade Kester

Shondrella Dupre Avery is an American actress, model and comedian. Her film roles include as LaFawnduh Lucas-Dynamite in the independent comedy Napoleon Dynamite (2004), and supporting roles in Domino (2005) and The Secret Life of Bees (2008).

== Early life ==
Avery was born in Los Angeles, California, and grew up in South Central Los Angeles, as the oldest of 10 children. She has created a one-woman show titled "Ain't I Enough," based on her experiences growing up with her enormous family, which has aired on HBO.

She graduated from Los Angeles County High School for the Arts and studied for her Bachelor of Fine Arts degree from California State University, Los Angeles.

== Career ==
Avery began her career as a comic, performing as a member of the improvisational comedy groups The Groundlings in Los Angeles, and The Second City in Chicago. She and her family produced four different "workout" spots for up-and-coming and seasoned comics throughout Los Angeles County, while working a corporate job. Her first big break came in 2001 during a Fourth of July celebration on Martha's Vineyard hosted by local politicians related to her high school friend. She and good friend Tony Rock (brother to Chris Rock) performed, with an overwhelming response.

From 2002 until 2005, Avery had a recurring role as Candy Taylor on the situation comedy One on One and later became a cast member on the spinoff Cuts, playing the same role. Simultaneously, she was a cast member for five seasons on the first all-female reality/prank television series, Girls Behaving Badly.

In movies, Avery played internet girlfriend "LaFawnduh Lucas-Dynamite" in the 2004 film Napoleon Dynamite. At the time of being cast, Avery was working as a contracts executive at the Hilton Hotels Corporation in Beverly Hills. She subsequently had supporting roles in the films Trippin' and Domino. She also appeared in Déjà Vu with Denzel Washington, in which she was directed by Tony Scott for the second time. In 2012, Avery appeared in End of Watch, starring Jake Gyllenhaal and Michael Peña. The movie was filmed in her native South Central Los Angeles, and was written and directed by Training Day writer David Ayer.

In 2007, Avery appeared in a People magazine "who wore it best" feature comparing her to Beyoncé in an H&M dress. In US magazine, she was pictured with Mena Suvari attending Carmelo Anthony's Shoe launch in 2008. She has also been seen at many of Macy Gray's concerts. Gray played Avery's twin sister in Domino. In 2010 she staged a high tea at Philippe Chow for friend Mo'Nique, also from Domino, in honour of her Oscar nomination. The day after the high tea, Mo'Nique won the Oscar for her acclaimed performance in Precious. Avery helped celebrate the win when she made an appearance on the Mo'Nique show in 2010.

In June 2023, Avery and Jeff Jenkins Productions signed a first-look deal. In addition she is developing multiple projects with Macy Gray and John Salley.

== Personal life ==
Avery's husband is Ade Kester. Avery has been linked to many philanthropic causes. She is a children's advocate, mentoring kids at "A Place Called Home" in South Central. She's also involved with the WGA Writer's Program for teens, speaking at high schools and universities. She gives time at Los Angeles children's charity Penny Lane and is a sitting board member of the Sickle Cell Disease Foundation of California; her mother has the disease, and two of her siblings died of it. She also works with Coach Art, a charity offering free athletic and arts training to chronically ill children.

== Filmography ==
=== Film ===
Year	Title	Role	Notes
1999	Cyberdorm	Lawanda	
1999	Trippin'	Amazon Woman	
2004	Napoleon Dynamite	LaFawnduh Lucas	
2005	Domino	Lashindra Davis	
2006	Déjà Vu	Kathy	
2008	The Secret Life of Bees	Greta	
2010	Our Family Wedding	Keisha Boyd	
2012	End of Watch	Bonita	
2014	Happy Anniversary Honey	Donna	Short
2015	Will to Love	Monica Hawkins	TV movie
2015	Klown Forever	Savannah	
2016	A Weekend with the Family	Rosie	
2016	Boy Bye	Charity	
2019	Halfway	-	Short
2021	Free Byrd	Red	
2024	Thelma the Unicorn	Zirconia	Voice

=== Television ===
Year	Title	Role	Notes
2000	The Jamie Foxx Show	Female Security Guard	Episode: "On Bended Knee"
2002–2004	Girls Behaving Badly	Herself	Main Cast
2002–2005	One on One	Candy	Guest: Season 1, Recurring Cast: Seasons 2–4
2003	Strong Medicine	Etta	Episode: "Prescriptions"
2005–2006	Cuts	Candy	Main Cast
2006	Community Service	Selma	Episode: "Pilot"
2009	Eleventh Hour	Louella	Episode: "Madea"
2010	Gillian in Georgia	Alicia	Recurring Cast
2020	Game On: A Comedy Crossover Event	Lil' Mama	Episode: "Family Reunion: Remember the Family's Feud?"
2022	Single Drunk Female	Annalisa	Episode: "James"
2022	The Neighborhood	Demi	Episode: "Welcome to the Ring"
