= Cuts (TV series) =

American sitcom

- Created by: Eunetta T. Boone; Bennie R. Richburg Jr.
- Starring: Marques Houston; Shannon Elizabeth; Shondrella Avery; Rashaan Nall; Edward "Grapevine" Fordham Jr.; Béatrice Rosen
- Theme music composer: Marques Houston; Chris Stokes
- Composers: Omaarr Rambert; Jae Staxx
- Country of origin: United States
- Original language: English
- No. of seasons: 2
- No. of episodes: 31

Production
- Executive producers: Eunetta T. Boone; Bennie R. Richburg Jr.
- Production companies: The Greenblatt/Janollari Studio; Penrose Productions; Daddy's Girl Productions; Paramount Network Television

Original release
- Network: UPN
- Release: February 14, 2005 – May 11, 2006

Related
- One on One

Cuts is an American sitcom that aired on UPN from February 14, 2005, to May 11, 2006, and is a spinoff of another UPN series, One on One. The show was canceled when UPN and The WB networks merged to form The CW.

== Cast ==
=== Main ===
- Marques Houston as Kevin Barnes, younger brother of One on One's Flex Washington (Flex Alexander)
- Shannon Elizabeth as Tiffany Sherwood
- Shondrella Avery as Candy Taylor, girlfriend of One on One's Duane Knox
- Rashaan Nall as Walt Powell, Candy's former foster brother
- Edward "Grapevine" Fordham Jr. as Ace Fields
- Béatrice Rosen as Faith

=== Recurring ===
- Corbin Bernsen as Jack Sherwood, Tiffany's father, previously played by David Garrison on One on One
- Omarion as Darius

== Episodes ==
=== Series overview ===
Season	Episodes	Originally released	
Season	Episodes	First released	Last released
1	9	February 14, 2005	May 23, 2005
2	22	September 22, 2005	May 11, 2006

=== Season 1 (2005) ===
No. overall	No. in season	Title	Directed by	Written by	Original release date	Viewers (millions)
1	1	"Cutting Corners"	Brian K. Roberts	Eunetta T. Boone	February 14, 2005	3.48
Kevin and Tiffany spend lavishly on items that they do not need for the new salon and cut corners on several necessary repairs, they jeopardize their opening when the building inspector threatens to shut them down. So then, Kevin and Tiffany fail to get more money from Tiffany's hair-care mogul father Jack, they are forced to work with each other and rally the staff to get the place ready for the grand opening.
2	2	"Why Can't We Be Friends?"	Brian K. Roberts	Bennie R. Richburg, Jr.	February 21, 2005	3.23
Kevin quits as CO-manager of Cuts when the whole staff falls in love with Tiffany's warm and fuzzy management style over his more disciplined approach. Later, when the staff starts coming in late and taking advantage of her, Tiffany realizes she needs to go to Kevin for help.
3	3	"Keeping It Real"	Alfonso Ribeiro	Kenny Smith, Jr.	February 28, 2005	3.52
Tiffany hires a publicist to help the spa get a higher profile. So when 'Cuts' becomes the hot place to be in town, it causes the staff instantly become affected by their new popularity. Meanwhile, when all the hype dies down, Tiffany and Kevin realize they have turned on their regular neighborhood customers, and so now they must figure out a way to win them back.
4	4	"Rich Man, Broke Man"	Leonard R. Garner Jr.	Jacque Edmonds Cofer	March 14, 2005	3.06
Tiffany brings her new working-class boyfriend Ben to her father for dinner. And then she is surprised when her snooty ex-boyfriend shows up and tries to win Tiffany back. Meanwhile, Kevin and Walt pretend to be wealthy people to impress their gold digging dates.
5	5	"My Boyfriend's Back"	Gary Shimokawa	B. Mark Seabrooks	March 28, 2005	3.51
Tiffany starts to date her rich ex-boyfriend Harrison, she quickly falls back into the wealthy lifestyle that she left behind. So that causes her to neglect her duties at the salon. Meanwhile, Kevin sees Tiffany's quickly losing interest in the salon as an opportunity to take total control and make the salon more manly.
6	6	"The Hook Up"	Ken Whittingham	Chrissy Pietrosh & Jessica Goldstein	May 2, 2005	2.81
Trying to save money on products for the salon, Kevin purchases special spa oils that unknowingly act as an aphrodisiac and creates quite a stir among the staff and clients.
7	7	"Switch Cutters"	Leonard R. Garner Jr.	Charlie Bonomo	May 9, 2005	2.87
Kevin starts to bond with Jack, which makes Tiffany jealous. Then that leads to Tiffany competing with Kevin for her father's attention.
8	8	"A Superstar Is Born"	John Tracy	Bennie R. Richburg, Jr.	May 16, 2005	3.40
Tiffany and Kevin become mentors to two teenagers, but both are forced to look at their values when the kids cause trouble by following their examples. Meanwhile, Kevin wants to get back on the road with his girl and his other business. Also, Tiffany gets kicked out of her dad's house, because she threw a party.
9	9	"On the Road Again"	Maynard Virgil	Eunetta T. Boone	May 23, 2005	3.40
Tiffany gets in a disagreement with her father, she leaves her home and then she ends up on Kevin's couch. Meanwhile, Kevin's ex-girlfriend from his "rap star" haircutting days comes and gives Kevin a job to come back on the road.

=== Season 2 (2005–06) ===
No. overall	No. in season	Title	Directed by	Written by	Original release date	Viewers (millions)
10	1	"Welcome Back, Barber-rino"	Leonard R. Garner, Jr.	Bennie R. Richburg, Jr.	September 22, 2005	2.77
Kevin returns from the road hoping to get his job back; Tiffany has other plans and decides to bring on another superstar female hairstylist instead. Later, refusing to admit that he desperately needs his job back, Kevin concocts a plan to make Tiffany believe she can't get along without him.
11	2	"Home Alone"	Ken Whittingham	Jacque Edmonds Cofer	September 29, 2005	2.75
Annoyed that Tiffany has moved into his apartment, Kevin relocates to Jack's mansion and wastes no time adjusting to all of the trappings of the good life. Meanwhile, Candy tries to pretend that she is over her break-up with her fiancé, but her co-workers don't believe she is telling them the truth.
12	3	"Babe Magnet"	Ken Whittingham	Erica Montolfo-Bura	October 6, 2005	2.53
After trying to buddy up with Kevin, Tiffany inadvertently discovers that he is using her just to meet women, leaving her to question her friendship with him and everyone at the salon. Hip-Hop group Ying Yang Twins, Eric Jackson & D'eongelo Holmes, guest star as themselves. Meanwhile, Candy and Faith decide to give online dating a try.
13	4	"Strictly Biz-nass"	Leonard R. Garner, Jr.	B. Mark Seabrooks	October 13, 2005	2.88
After Jack refuses to give them raises, Kevin and Tiffany are outraged to learn that Cuts is actually the most profitable store in his chain, and her dad is intentionally hiding it from them. Later, after coming to Faith's rescue with her car problems, Walt misinterprets the attention she gives him to mean she's romantically interested.
14	5	"Mack Daddies"	Leonard R. Garner, Jr.	Chrissy Pietrosh & Jessica Goldstein	October 20, 2005	2.45
Tiffany doesn't like that her father is dating a younger girl. The girl's father feels the same way and they plot to break up the happy couple.
15	6	"Reverse the Curse"	John Tracy	Josh Wolf	October 27, 2005	2.22
Kevin, along with Darius, invent a new hair care line in hopes of Jack investing in it. Meanwhile, Candy shows everyone her other job as a hairdresser in a funeral parlor.
16	7	"Hair Tease"	Leonard R. Garner Jr.	Chrissy Pietrosh & Jessica Goldstein	November 3, 2005	2.47
Tired of the male staff's misogynist behavior towards the female customers and staff, Tiffany forces everyone to attend a sexual harassment seminar to help clean up the boys' act. Darius returns. Later, after the uptight sexual harassment trainer Ms. Fennell drastically changes the salon into an unpleasant environment, the staff volunteers Ace to get rid of her, since she has taken an interest in him.
17	8	"Wife Swap"	John Tracy	Jacque Edmonds Cofer	November 10, 2005	2.69
Kevin and Tiffany pretend to be married during a business trip in order to get a new spa product.
18	9	"Analyze What?"	John Tracy	Shawnte McCall	November 17, 2005	2.88
Kevin and Tiffany receive harsh evaluations from their staff and decide to confront them to find out who is sabotaging them.
19	10	"The Turkey Triangle"	Maynard Virgil	Kenny Smith, Jr.	November 24, 2005	1.92
Tiffany learns the truth about her parents divorce when her mother comes for Thanksgiving.
20	11	"Blinging in the New Year"	Maynard Virgil	B. Mark Seabrooks	December 15, 2005	2.66
Jack demands that the shop be open on New Year's Eve. Kevin and Tiffany leave the staff to work while they go to a party at the mayor's mansion.
21	12	"Black Don't Crack"	Gary Shimokawa	Erica Montofolo-Bura	January 19, 2006	1.92
Tiffany hires a plastic surgeon for the Medi-Spa.
22	13	"Rogue Trip"	Gary Shimokawa	Jeffery S. Dyson	February 2, 2006	1.88
Kevin loses Cuts when he and the gang go to Atlantic City for Walt's Comedy Festival.
23	14	"The Love Below"	Katy Garretson	Chrissy Pietrosh & Jessica Goldstein	February 9, 2006	2.46
Tiffany hires a handsome masseur and immediately gets involved with him. Kevin looks up a former lover who hurt him several years ago. He discovers that she has long since moved on from him.
24	15	"Carpal Kids"	John Tracy	Josh Wolf	February 16, 2006	2.06
Tiffany reconsiders her relationship with boyfriend Jeremy after learning that he has two kids. Kevin believes he has carpal tunnel syndrome, but he refuses to see a doctor.
25	16	"Class Dismissed"	Alfonso Ribeiro	Hale Rothstein	March 2, 2006	2.01
Used to only dating women who treat him like a king, Kevin sets his sights on a sexy doctor, only to find himself in unfamiliar territory when he starts tending to her every need.
26	17	"Strictly Biz-Nass 2: Biz Nastier"	John Tracy	Shawnte McCall	March 23, 2006	2.27
When Jack decides to try his hand in real estate and builds condominiums in the neighborhood which will shut down small shops, Kevin tries to persuade Tiffany to join a protest against her father to get him to stop his plans.
27	18	"Codebreakers"	Gary Shimokawa	Jacque Edmonds Cofer	April 13, 2006	1.73
Tiffany questions her relationship with Jeremy after an old college friend comes to visit and she realizes she may have feelings for him; Candy finds a new boyfriend, but Kevin learns that he is also dating three other women.
28	19	"Coupling...Except Funnier"	Maynard Virgil	Kenny Smith Jr.	April 20, 2006	2.15
Kevin reluctantly agrees to double date with Tiffany and Jeremy, but he soon regrets it; rumors circulate at the salon that Faith and Walt are splitting up.
29	20	"Adult Education"	Joe Menendez	Valencia Parker	April 27, 2006	1.81
Kevin audits a business course after being a guest speaker in the class and is embarrassed by his lack of knowledge; Tiffany tries to educate Jeremy in the proper way to dress; Walt and Ace demand a new men's room at the salon that is as nice as the ladies' room.
30	21	"It's a Ring Thing"	Gary Shimokawa	Bennie R. Richburg, Jr.	May 4, 2006	2.12
Tiffany tries to help her cousin, Jordan, get over a recent breakup; Kevin gives jewelry to Felicia for their three-month anniversary, but her reaction shocks him; Walt gets jealous when Faith starts spending time with her ex-husband.
31	22	"Hollaback, Girl"	Bennie R. Richburg Jr.	Eunetta T. Boone	May 11, 2006	1.80
Tiffany decides she is ready to move on and accepts her father's offer of becoming Senior V.P. of Development for Sherwood Industries, leaving Kevin to run the salon on his own. Meanwhile, Walt discover's a pregnancy test.
