= Brian K. Roberts =

American television director

- Occupation(s): Television director, television producer, television writer
- Years active: 1981–present

Brian K. Roberts is an American television director. He is credited with directing over 350 programs for US television and over 200 episodes of Canadian television and films. He also directed few episodes of PBS/TVO Kids's "Odd Squad" season 2.

== Career ==
Roberts has directed some of television's most popular sitcoms on both sides of the border. While in Los Angeles, he directed episodes of the CBS series Everybody Loves Raymond and The King of Queens, ABC's The Drew Carey Show, Sabrina the Teenage Witch, Two Guys, a Girl and a Pizza Place, The Hughleys, According To Jim which starred Jim Belushi, and the ABC/WB series Clueless, NBC's Boston Common, Fox's MADtv and the UPN series One on One and Eve, as well as About a Girl, Naturally, Sadie, The Jane Show, Cuts, How to be Indie, The Tony Danza Show, What I Like About You, Phil of the Future, Kristin, Zoe, Duncan, Jack and Jane, Oh, Grow Up, Grown Ups, 100 Deeds For Eddie McDowd, Thanks, Teen Angel, George and Leo, The George Carlin Show, Spun Out and the Disney Channel series Lizzie McGuire.

In addition, he was involved with The Simpsons in the early seasons from 1989 to 1991 and worked as an editor, a dialogue editor and as a writer, including penning the season two episode "Brush with Greatness".

He is not to be confused with the voice actor also named Brian K. Roberts, best known for his work on the VeggieTales series.
