= Leonard R. Garner Jr. =

American actor and television director

- Born: Leonard Rudolph Garner Jr.
- Other name: Lenny Garner
- Education: Syracuse University
- Occupations: Television director, actor
- Years active: 1975-present

Leonard Rudolph "Lenny" Garner Jr. is an American television director and actor.

== Early life and education ==
Garner grew up in Scranton, Pennsylvania. He joined Syracuse University's College of Visual and Performing Arts to become a professional actor, but decided to become a movie director. He graduated in 1974.

== Career ==
Garner began his acting career guest-starring on Cheers, Moonlighting, Beauty and the Beast and the 1980s sitcom Brothers, making his directorial debut on the latter series. During most of the 1980s to early 1990s, Garner also worked as an assistant director on The Rockford Files, Miami Vice, Wings and the feature film The Blues Brothers.

Beginning in 1994, Garner has directed episodes of Sister, Sister, Two Guys and a Girl, NewsRadio, Just Shoot Me!, Sabrina the Teenage Witch, The King of Queens, One on One, Eve, The Game, According to Jim, Rules of Engagement, and True Jackson, VP, among other series.
