= Camille Mana =

American actress

- Occupation: Actress
- Years active: 2001–present

Camille Mana is an American actress.

== Career ==
Camille Mana originated the title role in the World Premiere of Asuncion, a play written by Jesse Eisenberg. She starred opposite Eisenberg and Justin Bartha at The Cherry Lane Theatre in New York. She played the role of Amanda in the West Coast Premiere of 4000 Miles at the American Conservatory Theater.

She portrayed Ruby, sister to Mel Bayani (Liza Lapira) on season two of The Equalizer. Mana appears in Lionsgate feature film Scrambled, starring Yvonne Strahovski and June Diane Raphael set to premiere at 2023 South by Southwest festival. She co-stars in Netflix animated feature film as Jing, love interest to Geraldo (Patrick Warburton) in Seal Team opposite JK Simmons, Matthew Rhys, and Kristen Schaal.

Mana appeared in the Miramax Films dramedy Smart People playing Missy Chin which premiered at Sundance and co-starred in the MGM teen comedy film College. She got her first major role as Lisa on the sitcom One on One starring Kyla Pratt during the fifth and final season. She can be seen in feature films including Cake, Norman, High School, All I Want, and Speed-Dating. She portrayed Rose Castillo, a victim of an Asian-American hate crime on the NBC drama New Amsterdam.

She produced a short film, Equal Opportunity starring Aldis Hodge, Alanna Ubach, and Tom Lenk, which won NBC's First Annual Comedy Shortcuts Festival and Official Selection at SXSW, Montreal Just For Laughs Festival, and dozens more. She co-produced the dramatic feature film The Things We Carry, and produced the short film Carnal Orient which debuted at the Slamdance Film Festival.

== Personal life ==
Camille was raised in Orange County, California. She attended the University of California, Berkeley. Mana resides in Los Angeles and Brooklyn.

== Filmography ==
=== Film ===
| Year | Title | Role | Notes |
|---|---|---|---|
| 2004 | Harlequin | Peggy Lin | Short |
| 2005 | Johnny Benson's Adventures in the Blogosphere | Allison | Short |
| 2007 | Equal Opportunity | Grace Ching Chong | |
| 2008 | Smart People | Missy Chin | |
| 2008 | College | Heather | |
| 2009 | Why Am I Doing This? | Nicky | |
| 2009 | Why Men Go Gay in LA | - | |
| 2010 | The Samurai of Strongsville, Ohio | Suki Hosukawa | Short |
| 2010 | High School | Dana | |
| 2010 | Speed-Dating | Kiki | |
| 2010 | Norman | Helen Black | |
| 2014 | Cake | Nurse Salazar | |
| 2016 | Oh Em Gee | God | Short |
| 2017 | All I Want | Cami | |
| 2017 | Five Star Fouad | Janey | Short |
| 2018 | The Rough Part | Diana | Short |
| 2018 | Girl On the Side | Lisa | Short |
| 2019 | Stay in Your Lane | Isabel (voice) | Short |
| 2021 | Seal Team | Jing | |
| 2022 | A Tale Told by an Idiot | The Bat | |
| 2023 | Scrambled | Jen | |
| 2024 | Museum Worthy | Strategist | Short |
| 2024 | We Good? | Lily | Short |
| 2025 | Captain Tsunami | Dr. White | |

=== Television ===
| Year | Legacy | Role | Notes |
|---|---|---|---|
| 2001 | Angel | Les | Episode: "The Thin Dead Line" |
| 2001 | Arrest & Trial | Aviola Teo | Episode: "Valentine Murders" |
| 2003 | The O.C. | Underclassman P.A. | Episode: "Pilot" |
| 2005–06 | One on One | Lisa Sanchez | Main Cast: Season 5 - 22 episodes |
| 2013 | Chosen | Jennifer | Episode: "Second Chances" |
| 2014 | Bones | (voice) | Episode: "Big in the Philippines" |
| 2016 | This Isn't Working | Leslie | Episode: "The First Date" |
| 2017 | Indie | Brianna | Episode: "Pilot" |
| 2017 | The Josh Moore Show | Tessa | Episode: "Giving Homeless Kids a Ride to the O.C." |
| 2018 | Grow the F* Up | Vicki | Episode: "Nan" |
| 2020 | MacGyver | Hanna | Episode: "Red Cell + Quantum + Cold + Committed" |
| 2020 | Woke | Scooter (voice) | Episode: "What Prequels?" |
| 2021 | New Amsterdam | Rose Castillo | Episode: "Blood, Sweat & Tears" |
| 2023 | The Equalizer | Ruby | Episode: "He Ain't Heavy" |
| 2024 | How to Destroy Everything | Therapist | Episode: "How to Destroy a Divorce: Part 1" |
