= Bill Boulware =

American producer and screenwriter

- Occupation(s): Producer, screenwriter
- Spouse: Judy Smith
- Children: 2

Bill Boulware is an American producer and screenwriter. He was the creator of the sitcom television series 227 along with Michael G. Moye. Boulware produced and wrote for television programs including, The Parkers, Cosby, New Attitude, Benson, Drexell's Class, One on One, and The Fresh Prince of Bel-Air.
