= Eunetta T. Boone =

American television writer and producer (1955–2019)

- Born: May 16, 1955; Washington, D.C., US
- Died: March 20, 2019 (aged 63); Los Angeles, California, US
- Education: University of Maryland; Columbia University
- Occupations: Producer; journalist

Eunetta T. Boone (May 16, 1955 – March 20, 2019) was an American television writer and producer. She was the creator and writer of several television series. At the time of her death, she was serving as the executive producer and showrunner for the third season of the Disney Channel series Raven's Home.

== Life and career ==
Boone was born in Washington, D.C., United States. Her parents ensured that she and her sister were raised "culturally enriched". Boone graduated with a degree in journalism from the University of Maryland and a Master of Science in journalism from Columbia University. She was a sports reporter for the evening edition of The Baltimore Sun, the first African-American woman to hold the position at the newspaper.

In 1990, Boone made the career change from sportswriting when she took a screenwriting workshop offered by the Maryland Film Commission. She later took part in a Warner Bros. writing workshop and held jobs as a staff writer on several series, such as The Fresh Prince of Bel-Air, Roc, and The Parent 'Hood. She became an executive producer and concurrently served on two hit shows for 20th Century Fox and Disney's Touchstone Television, The Hughleys and My Wife and Kids. This led to Boone creating her own comedy series, One on One, and its spinoff, Cuts. UPN canceled One on One and Cuts in 2006 due to its merger with The WB, forming The CW.

Boone also wrote a feature film script titled Who Is Doris Payne? As of 2018, the biographical film about jewel thief Doris Payne had remained in development for more than a decade. In 2011, an autobiography of jockey Sylvia Harris co-written by Boone and William H. Boulware was published by Ecco Press.

From 2007 to 2013, Boone was a screenwriting instructor with an emphasis in comedy writing in the UCLA Extension Writers' Program. She went on to become an advisor to Raven-Symoné for the series Raven's Home, and was to be its executive producer and showrunner for its upcoming third season. The production was temporarily shut down following Boone's death.

== Death ==
Boone died of an apparent heart attack in her Los Angeles home on March 20, 2019. She was 63.

== Filmography ==
Year	Title	Role
1992	The Fresh Prince of Bel-Air	Writer
1992–1993	Roc	Writer
1994–1996	Living Single	Producer
1996	Lush Life	Producer and writer
1997–1998	The Parent 'Hood	Writer
1998–2000	The Hughleys	Co-executive producer
2001	My Wife and Kids	Co-executive producer
2001–2006	One on One	Creator and showrunner
2005–2006	Cuts	Creator and showrunner
2019	Raven's Home	Executive producer
