= One on One (American TV series) =

American sitcom (2001–2006)

- Genre: Sitcom
- Created by: Eunetta T. Boone
- Starring: Flex Alexander; Kyla Pratt; Kelly Perine; Sicily Sewell; Robert Ri'chard; Jonathan Chase; Camille Mana; Nicole Paggi; Ray J
- Theme music composer: Jonathan Wolff & Becky Kneubuhl; (remixed by Ray J and Detail for season 5)
- Opening theme: "Living One on One", performed by Shanice and Tonéx
- Ending theme: "Living One on One" (instrumental)
- Composers: Jonathan Wolff & Becky Kneubuhl (Season 1); Kurt Farquhar (Seasons 2 & 3); Jamey Jaz (Seasons 4 & 5)
- Country of origin: United States
- Original language: English
- No. of seasons: 5
- No. of episodes: 113 (list of episodes)

Production
- Executive producers: Eunetta T. Boone; Robert Greenblatt; David Janollari; Dan Cross; David Hoge; Bill Boulware; Flex Alexander
- Running time: 19–22 minutes
- Production companies: The Greenblatt/Janollari Studio; Daddy's Girl Productions; Paramount Network Television

Original release
- Network: UPN
- Release: September 3, 2001 – May 15, 2006

Related
- Cuts

One on One is an American sitcom created by Eunetta T. Boone and was aired on UPN from September 3, 2001, to May 15, 2006. The series stars Flex Alexander as a single sportscaster, who becomes a full-time father when his ex-wife decides to accept a job out of the country and his teenage daughter Breanna (Kyla Pratt) moves in with him. The series was set in Baltimore for the first four seasons, before changing settings to Los Angeles for the final season. The series was a joint production of the Greenblatt/Janollari Studio and Daddy's Girl Productions in association with Paramount Network Television. However, the show was not originally a Paramount production. In fact, the show was originally owned by Fox Television Studios but last minute, they ended up dropping out due to One on One not fitting in with the financial model.

The show was originally pitched to ABC when the pilot was shot in 1999. Unfortunately, due to the fact that ABC’s sitcom audiences were declining, they decided not to move forward with the project, so Flex and the creator of the show, Eunetta, pitched One on One to The WB. Since the network rebranded, they rejected it due to it not being “teen enough,” so in 2000, the show was pitched to Fox, considering that Fox Television Studios was the original distributor, but they too ended up passing on the show. Not long after ABC, The WB and Fox all passed on One on One, UPN executives took interest in the show considering their ties to Fox, and because the Moesha cancellation worked out in favor of One on One, UPN picked it up. However, Fox Television Studios dropped out at the last minute due to the fact that the show did not fit in with the network's financial model, so that’s when Paramount Television stepped in. The series featured guest appearances from numerous celebrities and athletes, including Lil' Zane, Chris Brown, Lil' Romeo, Eve, Lloyd, Floetry, Angie Stone, Mario, Omarion, Brandy, Solange Knowles, Nina Sky, Marques Houston, Smokey Robinson, Kim Fields, Avant, Jennifer Freeman, Nate Dogg, Bobby V, Claudia Jordan, Ruben Studdard, and Lisa Leslie. The show was cancelled months before The WB and UPN merged to form The CW.

The show would also have a spin-off series Cuts, which follows Flex's younger stepbrother Kevin Barnes running the local barbershop/day spa with a spoiled brat named Tiffany Sherwood after her father Jack Sherwood purchased the shop. The show premiered as a mid-season replacement during the 2004–2005 television season. The show lasted for only two seasons and was also canceled when UPN and The WB merged to form The CW.

== Synopsis ==
Set in Baltimore, the show focuses the lives of Flex Washington (Alexander) and his teenage daughter Breanna Barnes (Pratt). The series begins with Breanna wanting to stay with her father, Flex, whom Breanna used to see only two weeks a year. When he blew out his knee during an NBA game, Flex had his communications degree to fall back on (which he revealed in a later episode, he tried three times to get due to failing the class twice) and became a sportscaster. Flex works for the fictional WYNX-TV, resides in the ultimate bachelor pad, and lives the life of luxury. He is a ladies' man who wants to be both a responsible parent and a best friend to Breanna. Flex is very protective of his daughter, especially with boys. He has only had a few serious relationships, one of which was Breanna's mother Nicole Barnes (Tichina Arnold), whom he impregnated at the age of 18. When Nicole takes a job in the Canadian province of Nova Scotia, Nicole allows Breanna to live with Flex.

Flex's best friend and Breanna's godfather, Duane Odell Knox (Kelly Perine), is a used-car salesman who lives across the hall from Flex and Breanna and is a constant presence in their lives for better or worse. Duane's way with women is the exact opposite of Flex's, in which Duane usually repels women. The women he does date, however, are somewhat unusual. His only serious girlfriend during the series was Candy (Shondrella Avery), whom he dated for two years before getting engaged and later breaking up.

Breanna's best friend is Spirit Jones (Sicily Sewell) with whom she creates some mischief. Her other best friend, Arnaz Ballard (Robert Ri'chard), is the object of her on-again, off-again affection. The two were just friends, but Breanna became jealous of Arnaz's old girlfriend, Ginger (Khanya Mkhize). Arnaz became jealous when, in season 2, Breanna began dating Josh (Josh Henderson). The two finally became a couple in the latter part of the series. They break up during the third season and move on to date other people, though they know they still love each other. The series ends with Arnaz chasing after Michelle (Brandy Norwood), D-Mack's sister, with whom he has fallen in love while Breanna is shown in bed with D-Mack (Ray J).

== Episodes ==
Season	Episodes	Originally released	
Season	Episodes	First released	Last released
1	22	September 3, 2001	May 20, 2002
2	23	September 23, 2002	May 19, 2003
3	24	September 16, 2003	May 25, 2004
4	22	September 20, 2004	May 23, 2005
5	22	September 19, 2005	May 15, 2006

== Cast and characters ==
=== Main ===
- Flex Alexander as Flexter "Flex" Alexander Barnes/Flex Washington (seasons 1–4; recurring season 5) – Flex was born to Richard and Eunice Barnes and is the oldest of three children. In high school, Flex met Nicole, who became his first serious girlfriend. Before that, Flex had a reputation with women that caused many fathers in his neighborhood to dislike him. At age 18, Flex got Nicole pregnant as a senior in high school and they got married. She gave birth to a baby daughter named Breanna when they were 19 years old. A year later, Flex and Nicole went their separate ways when Flex pursued a career in the NBA playing for the Los Angeles Clippers, New York Knicks and Orlando Magic. During a game, however, he blew out his knee and was sidelined. Luckily, he had a communications degree to fall back on (which he admitted he tried to get twice) and became a sportscaster in Baltimore for television station WYNX News 3. After his daughter stays over for two weeks, Nicole springs the news that she got a job in Nova Scotia and wants to take Breanna with her. Flex unwittingly volunteers to take care of Breanna, though it may hamper his bachelor lifestyle. After his divorce from Nicole, Flex had taken on a player persona and even had a 30-day rule, vowing not to date a woman for more than 30 days and run the risk of their connection becoming a romantic relationship. He broke that rule when he dated Natalie, Breanna's art teacher. However, they broke up a year into their romance because she wanted to be a good stepmom to Breanna rather than have children of her own. A year later, Flex began dating Danielle, a psychotherapist who initially did not want to date him because Flex and Brianna were her clients. Flex and Danielle eventually began dating and later became engaged. Around the same time, his show The Flex Files became syndicated. In season 5, the show's premise was revamped and Flex was phased out of the series, but he appeared occasionally as a recurring character. He would fly out to California to visit Breanna and to also make sure Arnaz was not trying to have sex with her.
- Kyla Pratt as Breanna Latrice Barnes – Breanna is the daughter of Flex Washington and Nicole Barnes, born when the two were 19. When Breanna finds out that her mother Nicole got a job in Nova Scotia, Breanna comes up with the idea to have Flex take care of her. During her stay with Flex, her best friend Spirit and she joined the cheerleading squad, which she initially would have never thought to try out for until the head cheerleader taunts her and tries everything she can to keep her from joining. Breanna has had several crushes, including Arnaz, one of her two best friends, who became an on-again/off-again love interest during the series, and in whom she did not show any romantic interest until the end of the first season. Breanna dated Josh, a handsome but dimwitted boy, who became part of a love triangle between Breanna, Josh, and Arnaz. Eventually, Breanna and Arnaz became a couple, only to break up when Josh and Arnaz' ex-girlfriend Ginger came up with a plan to break the two up, in which Breanna caught Ginger kissing Arnaz. During the third season, Arnaz and Breanna seemed to be on the way to getting back together until he revealed he was not a virgin one night when Breanna wanted to lose her virginity to Arnaz to stay popular with the cheerleaders (she did not go through with it after she found out). Then, Breanna decided to remain a virgin until she was ready to have sex, even if it was not until she was married. Breanna also kind of went out with a boy from her school, Nyghtmare, whose real name was Clayton. He was smart, but had a reputation as a bad boy. When Breanna found out, she said something that almost leads to a kiss. Flex saw them and prevented Breanna from seeing him. Nightmare explained to Breanna's father what was going on, and she could see him again, but he came in before Arnaz could tell her his feelings for her. In the next episode, he was not there; they just had an attraction to each other. By the fourth season, Breanna and Arnaz finally became a couple, but Breanna had to endure jealousy when Charlie, a French girl, joined Arnaz's band as the lead singer. Nothing happened between Arnaz and Charlie, because his heart was with Breanna. In the season 4 finale, Breanna and Arnaz broke up after Nicole came up with a plot to keep Breanna from making the same mistakes that she made with Flex when they were her age, after Breanna announced she was going to live with Arnaz, and Flex tried to convince Arnaz to let Breanna go to California to attend the California Institute of the Arts. Arnaz ran onto the plane that Breanna was taking to California to tell her he could not live without her. They eventually went to California, where they moved in with four other roommates: Cash, D-Mack, Lisa, and Sara. They broke up again when Arnaz and their roommate D-Mack's sister began getting closer. She began dating Calvin, a manager at McDonald's, only to break up because he thought that her heart was still with Arnaz. Breanna tells Arnaz she still loves him. She is later seen in bed with D-Mack at the end of the last episode (part 2), to whom she loses her virginity. Breanna is the only character to appear in every episode of the series.
- Robert Ri'chard as Arnaz Leroy Ballard – Arnaz is an aspiring rock musician and was born to a Caucasian mother and an African-American father, who left his mother and owns a crab restaurant (this is seen when Arnaz's parents are shown later in the series, but this contradicted a reference in the first-season episode "The Case of the Almost Broken Heart", in which Breanna stated that Arnaz's father was Caucasian and his mother was of mixed African-American, Jamaican, and Chinese descent). Arnaz had his own rock band called Zanra (which is his name spelled in backwards). Arnaz had a massive crush on Breanna when they met, and would stop at nothing to impress her. Towards the end of season 1, however, as he got her attention, his attention turned to Ginger, who became Breanna's rival. After Ginger and he broke up, Arnaz attempted to get Breanna back, but Breanna was dating Josh at the time. One Christmas, Breanna was given a half-heart pendant by Arnaz, who kept half of the pendant to show he would always keep Breanna close to his heart. In the season 4 premiere, Arnaz, Breanna, and Spirit ran off to New York to pursue their dreams (Breanna acting, Arnaz playing guitar, and Spirit designing). After three years of a "will they or won't they" situation between them, Arnaz and Breanna became a couple in the fourth season. A year later, Arnaz and Breanna's relationship hit the skids when their roommate D-Mack's sister Michelle (Brandy Norwood) visited, and eventually, Arnaz and Michelle became close friends. One night, the two fell asleep on the couch, Michelle was fully dressed and Arnaz is wearing pants but no shirt. Breanna and their roommates, Sara, D-Mack, Lisa, and Cash, walked in after returning from a party in Mexico and saw them. Though they had never done anything intimate, Breanna and Arnaz broke up. Eventually, Michelle and Arnaz did get together, but they went their separate ways after Michelle realized Arnaz's heart was still with Breanna. He thought differently, so he stole Breanna's car (with permission) and chased Michelle to the mountains. However, since the series did not make it to the sixth season, whether Breanna and Arnaz would eventually get back together remained undetermined.
- Sicily as Cloteal "Spirit" Freedom Jones (seasons 1–4) – Spirit is the daughter of Leilani and Cooper Jones, former Black hippies who run an incense shop. Spirit knew Arnaz since they were young children and became best friends with Breanna. Spirit has an quirky fashion sense, which has given her the distinction of being the "Black Blossom Russo." In one episode, Spirit was revealed to have once kissed Arnaz in a game of spin the bottle. The secret angered Breanna because she liked Arnaz, but the two friends apologized for the situation, as Breanna explained that Spirit was one of her few true friends. A running gag in the series is how Spirit never has a boyfriend. This changed in the fourth season when Spirit began dating A-Train (Lloyd), Arnaz's rival in a battle of the bands' contest. Their relationship strained Arnaz and hers for a while, but eventually, they mended fences. She did not appear in the final season.
- Kelly Perine as Duane Odell Knox (seasons 1–4) – Duane is a used-car salesman for Big Sal's Used Cars, who lived up to the stereotype that car salesmen cheat their customers. As he says in the episode "Playing Possum", he "eats sleaze for breakfast and washes it down with a tall glass of dishonesty." Duane was Flex's best friend since they were children. Duane had lived in his mother's basement well into his 30s, eventually moving into an apartment across the hall from Flex. He had an on-again/off-again relationship with Candace Taylor (known as Candy), a manicurist at Flex's father's barbershop Phatheadz. They first broke up after Duane lied to her about losing his job at Big Sal's. They later became engaged, but eventually broke off the engagement. When Duane found out he had a serious health issue (high cholesterol), he needed to contact his father, since his high cholesterol might be hereditary. He met his father, Vaughn Odell Knox (Smokey Robinson) after months of searching for him. Not long after, Vaughn asked Duane for a kidney, which turned out to be for Duane's half-brother Dwayne (Orlando Brown). After losing his car-salesman job, he started his own business, D's Dubs and Subs, which was a cross between a sandwich shop and a custom auto part shop. Throughout the series, Duane always wore a hat, because, when they were children, Flex's brother Kevin made a mistake while practicing his barbering skills on Duane, which in pain; this was revealed in the episode "Phatheadz". The character was written out of the series for season 5.
- Camille Mana as Lisa Sanchez (season 5) – The character of Lisa Sanchez was introduced at the beginning of season 5. Lisa is one of the four roommates with whom Breanna and Arnaz live when they move to California. Other than her roommates, she is somewhat overlooked by people, such as D-Mack's sister Michelle (Brandy Norwood), who is not remember her at all, though she lived with D-Mack. Lisa has had a long-standing crush on D-Mack, though he takes without interest in her. She eventually dates Benjamin, the handsome, nerdy manager of the BLOG, a restaurant hangout where Arnaz works.
- Jonathan Chase as Cash Bagan (season 5) – Cash is another of Breanna and Arnaz's roommates. Cash considers himself a filmmaker but works as a paparazzo to make money. Since the apartment has only two bedrooms, Arnaz is initially alarmed at the idea of sharing a room with Cash and D-Mack, but before long, the three become friends. Throughout the season, Cash chases women, and while he unlucky as he would like to be, he is more successful in his endeavors than D-Mack or Arnaz. At the end of one episode, in an amusing mirror of roommate Sara's usual behavior, Cash uses his toned body to entice a female hotel manager out of making them pay their bill.
- Ray J as Darrell "D-Mack" McGinty (season 5) – The character of Darrell McGinty, nicknamed "D-Mack", was introduced as one of the four roommates. D-Mack has a hip-hop persona, although his lifestyle as a Malibu rich kid comes out at times. He used his sister Michelle McGinty (Brandy Norwood) to become close to Arnaz, so he could date Breanna, but without success. He becomes upset to find out his sister and Arnaz are going behind everyone's back sneaking around together. Meanwhile, Michelle leaves Arnaz. He leaves, going after her to the mountains, leaving D-Mack and Breanna as the only ones left in the house. He questions her about being free, then unexpectedly kisses her. Later, Sara comes back to find them sleeping together in Breanna's bed. She panics, then leaves. The season is left with them together in bed.
- Nicole Paggi as Sara Crawford (season 5) – Sara is also one of the roommates and is the sexpot girl-next-door of the house. Sara is considered a white gold digger, and dreams of being a trophy wife since she grew up in a trailer park in Iowa. In the last episode, she dated Andrew, whom she met while Lisa and she accompanied Breanna to a clinic to get information on contraceptives (Breanna was prepared to have sex with Arnaz just to keep him from straying from her, but she did not), but his need to get to know Sara before having sex with her tired her to the point where she gave up on him. Her passiveness turned him on, but the next night, Sara caught Andrew with another woman.

=== Recurring ===
- Ron Canada as Richard, Flex's father (seasons 1–4)
- Joan Pringle as Eunice, Flex's mother (seasons 1–2)
- Marques Houston as Kevin, Flex's younger brother, who later runs the family's barbershop (seasons 3–5)
- Reagan Gomez-Preston as Bernadette, Flex's younger sister (season 2)
- Tamala Jones as Tanya, an old girlfriend of Flex's (season 1; guest season 4)
- Tichina Arnold as Nicole, Flex's ex-wife and Breanna's mother (seasons 1–3; guest season 4)
- Holly Robinson Peete as Stacy Morgan, Flex's boss (season 1)
- Jenny McCarthy as Holly Spears, Flex's co-host (season 3)
- Khanya Mkhize as Ginger, Breanna's rival and Arnaz's former girlfriend (seasons 1–3)
- Omar Gooding as Malik, a barber at Phatheadz (season 2)
- Laz Alonso as Manny, a barber at Phatheadz (seasons 2–3)
- Rashaan Nall as Walt, a barber at Phatheadz (seasons 2–4)
- Shondrella as Candy, a nail stylist at Phatheadz and love interest for Duane (seasons 2–4)
- Melissa De Sousa as Natalie Odessa, Breanna's teacher who later dates Flex (seasons 2–3)
- Josh Henderson as Josh McEntire, Breanna's new love interest after her break-up with Arnaz (seasons 2–3)
- Kim Coles as Leilani Jones, Spirit's mother (seasons 2–4)
- Edward "Grapevine" Fordham, Jr. as "Ace" Fields, a new barber at Phatheadz and later an intern on the Flex Files (seasons 2–4).
- Saskia Garel as Danielle, Flex's best friend and therapist, later girlfriend, then wife (season 4; guest season 5)
- Lloyd as "A-Train" (season 4)
- Kel Mitchell as Manny Sellers, the former child actor and Breanna's landlord (season 5)
- Ernie Grunwald as Benjamin (season 5)
- Brandy Norwood as Michelle, D-Mack's sister (season 5)

=== Notable guest stars ===
Season 1

- Laila Ali as Herself - (S1E5, "My Life as a Dog")
- Duane Martin as Elliott – (S1E8, "Phantom Menace")
- Alfonso Ribeiro as Lenny – (S1E16, "Me & My Shadow")

Season 2

- Clifton Powell as Coach Guillory – (S2E2, "I Believe I Can Fly")
- Larry Thomas (actor) as Akhmad – (S2E6, "Give me Some Credit")
- Method Man as Himself - (S2E7, "Give'm an Inch, They'll Throw a Rave")
- Big Show as Miles – (S2E10, "Is It Safe")

Season 3

- Angie Stone as Herself – (S3E14, "It's a Mad, Mad, Mad, Mad Hip Hop World")
- Anthony Hamilton as Himself – (S3E12, "Dream Seller")
- Avant as Himself – (S3E14, "It's a Mad, Mad, Mad, Mad Hip Hop World")
- Eve as A Waitress – (S3E14, "It's a Mad, Mad, Mad, Mad Hip Hop World")
- Floetry as Themselves – (S3E14, "It's a Mad, Mad, Mad, Mad Hip Hop World")
- Lil' Romeo as Eric – (S3E10, "Spy Games")
- Omarion as "Nyghtmare" – (S3E13, "East Meets East Coast")
- Orlando Brown as Dewane – (S3E16, "He's Not Heavy, He's My Half-Brother")
- Ruben Studdard as Himself – (S3E15, "The Catch")
- Solange Knowles as Charlotte – (S3E15, "The Catch")
- Smokey Robinson as Vaughn Odell Knox – (season 3)
- Brenda Song as Asoniti – (S3E8, "Keeping It")

Season 4

- Charlie Murphy as Larry Eldredge - (S4E5, "Rock the Vote")
- Nina Sky as Themselves – (S4E8, "Daddy's Home")
- Chingy as "Taz" – (S4E19, "Glug, Glug")

Season 5

- Jackée Harry as Sherri St. Croix - (S5E10, "Waiting for Huffman")
- Chris Brown as Himself – (S5E17, "Recipe for Disaster")
- Bobby V as Himself – (S5E10, "Waiting for Huffman")
- Tessie Santiago as Hannah – (S5E22, "I Love LA Part 2")

== Theme song and opening sequence ==
The show's theme song "Living One on One", was written and performed by Shanice (wife of the show's star Flex Alexander) and Tonex with music composed by Jonathan Wolff and Becky Kneubuhl (who composed the scene-change music for the first season). The theme song was slightly shortened and remixed by Detail and Ray J for the show's fifth season. A truncated version of the theme, which had no lyrics except for the words "One on One", was used as a closing theme, heard only in syndicated airings.

The opening titles for the first three seasons featured the cast playing basketball on an outdoor court (though it also showed some characters doing other things at that same setting, e.g., Spirit checking out a boy who walks past her, and Arnaz playing the guitar only to be interrupted by a basketball bouncing in his direction that fell out of Duane's hand and he chases him). The fourth-season opening titles featured the cast in a dressing room getting ready for a night on the town, the end of the sequence featuring a pan shot of the cast in the mirror wearing different outfits from what they were wearing at the beginning of the pan shot. The opening sequences for the first four seasons included a closeup shot of Flex, Breanna, and Arnaz before cutting back to a shot of the entire cast. The final season's opening titles featured the main cast (Breanna, Arnaz, and new characters D-Mack, Sara, Cash, and Lisa) at different places at the Venice Beach Boardwalk, before meeting back at the beach house to take a picture together.

== Nielsen ratings ==
Season	Episodes	Premiere	Season finale	Viewers	Rank
1	22	September 3, 2001	May 20, 2002	4.1 M	#132
2	23	September 23, 2002	May 19, 2003	4.16 M	#141
3	24	September 16, 2003	May 25, 2004	2.94 M	#184
4	22	September 20, 2004	May 23, 2005	3.1 M	#147
5	22	September 19, 2005	May 15, 2006	2.8 M	#139

== Syndication ==
One on One began airing in syndication in September 2006. CBS Paramount Domestic Television also held the distribution rights to the series for the first year of its syndication run. CBS Media Ventures (formerly CBS Television Distribution) has been the series' distributor since September 2007.

In the United States, One on One was broadcast on various local television stations (mostly Fox, The CW, and MyNetworkTV) affiliates from September 2006 to September 2009. The series was rerun on Noggin's teen block, The N, from October 2006 onward. It continued to air when The N was spun off into a 24-hour channel on December 31, 2007 and ran until October 2008. It rejoined the channel's lineup on September 14, 2009, and was moved to the successor channel TeenNick on September 28, 2009. It aired in two-hour blocks in the morning and late-night hours before being removed from TeenNick's lineup in 2013. The series began airing on BET in 2009, airing in two one-hour blocks (one weekday mornings and one in the afternoon), as well as Saturday broadcasts.

Formerly, Bounce TV and TV One both air the series. The series joined Netflix on October 15, 2020.

As of 2024, reruns of the series can be seen on Cleo TV and Dabl.

== International broadcast ==
In overseas, One on One is broadcast in Canada on BET and local affiliates; on Nine Network in Australia; on SABC1 in South Africa and in the Middle East on the Paramount Comedy Channel in the Middle East (however, the fifth season has yet to be aired in its entirety on Paramount Comedy). The series is broadcast across the African continent on Sony Entertainment Channel via the South African cable network DSTV.

== Awards and nominations ==
- BET Comedy Awards

2005 – Outstanding Directing for a Comedy Series – Ken Whittingham, Brian K. Roberts, Maynard C. Virgil I, Chip Fields & Mary Lou Belli (Nominated)
2005 – Outstanding Lead Actor in a Comedy Series – Flex Alexander (Nominated)
2004 – Outstanding Lead Actor in a Comedy Series – Flex Alexander (Nominated)

- Image Awards

2005 – Outstanding Actor in a Comedy Series – Flex Alexander (Nominated)
2004 – Outstanding Actor in a Comedy Series – Flex Alexander (Nominated)
2004 – Outstanding Supporting Actress in a Comedy Series – Kyla Pratt (Nominated)
2003 – Outstanding Actor in a Comedy Series – Flex Alexander (Nominated)
2003 – Outstanding Comedy Series (Nominated)

- Prism Awards

2005 – TV Comedy Series Episode for episode "No More Wire Hangers" (Won)
