= Philip Banks (The Fresh Prince of Bel-Air) =

- The Fresh Prince of Bel-Air and Bel-Air character
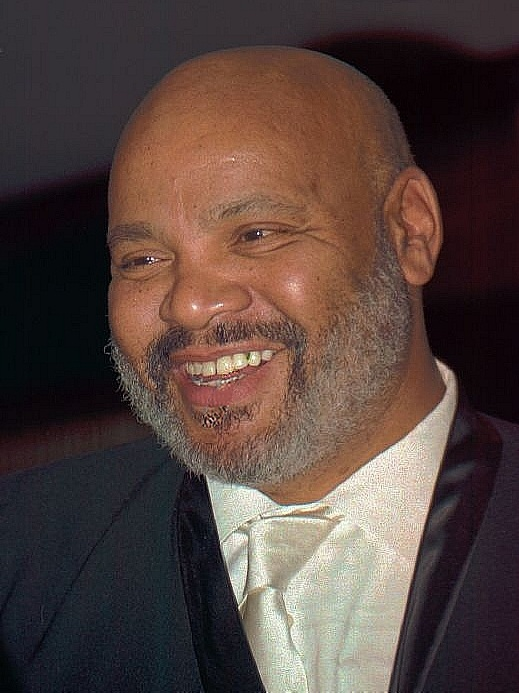
- James Avery, as he appeared while portraying Philip Banks
- First appearance: "The Fresh Prince Project" (1990) "Dreams and Nightmares" (2022)
- Last appearance: "I Done, Part 2" (1996)
- Portrayed by: James Avery (The Fresh Prince of Bel-Air); Granvile O'Neal (Bel-Air film); Adrian Holmes (Bel-Air TV series)

In-universe information
- Nicknames: Uncle Phil; Zeke
- Occupation: Lawyer (1990–1992); Superior court judge (1992–1996)
- Family: Joe Banks (father); Hattie Banks (mother)
- Spouse: Vivian Banks
- Children: Hilary Banks; Carlton Banks; Ashley Banks; Nicky Banks
- Relatives: Will Smith (nephew by marriage)

Philip Banks, commonly referred to as Uncle Phil, is a prominent supporting character on the American TV sitcom, The Fresh Prince of Bel-Air, played by James Avery from 1990 to 1996. A self-made wealthy lawyer, Banks is the uncle of the delinquent Will, and takes Will into his home in posh Bel Air, Los Angeles, following Will's neighborhood troubles in Philadelphia. The character has often been cited as "one of the best TV dads of all time".

In the 2022 reboot series, Bel-Air, the character is played by Adrian Holmes.

== Characterization ==
Banks is "the stern but loving uncle to Will Smith's character", parenting in this way both with Will and with his own children. By the end of the series, Banks has come to think of Will as his own son.

Avery sought to portray the character as "an Uncle Phil that everybody wishes was their uncle", and felt that it was important to show African-Americans striving for success. Outside of his family life, the character was "a former hippie-activist in the '60s turned Princeton-educated Los Angeles judge who was down to quote Malcolm X and call the criminal justice system out on its flaws at a moment's notice". As "a former civil rights activist and Harvard Law-trained attorney", the character became "a role model for Smith's sometimes wild character".

Holmes, in reprising the role, paid homage to Avery's depiction of "a good man and a real leader in every sense of the word", but also drew inspiration from Barack Obama as a modern role model.

== Story ==
In the pilot episode, "The Fresh Prince Project", Phil is initially happy to see Will, but dislikes his attire and use of slang. Phil is embarrassed by Will's uncouth behavior at a dinner with Phil's colleagues, and has a talk with Will afterwards. Will says that Phil does not know how life is on the streets, but Phil objects, telling him that he started his career on the streets of Baltimore. He references Will saying at the beginning of the episode that Malcolm X was his hero, complimenting his Malcolm X poster and saying he heard him speak.

Uncle Phil bails Will and Carlton out of jams on several occasions. In the episode, "Mistaken Identity", when Will and Carlton are arrested on suspicion of stealing a car that they had actually been paid by one of Philip’s law firm’s senior partners to drive from Bel-Air to Palm Springs, Phil berates the officers on duty for immediately writing the two off as criminals instead of going through the proper procedures, noting that they had not contacted him despite Will and Carlton being minors and Phil being both their legal guardian and their attorney. After their release, Will and Carlton argue about racial profiling, with Carlton insisting that the justice system is not flawed, but Phil recounts a similar personal experience. Later in the season, in the episode, "Banks Shot", Will steals the car keys to go to a pool hall, and winds up losing his money and the car to a hustler. Phil goes to rescue him, at first acting like he has never played pool before and letting the hustlers win, but then playing again with his signature cue named Lucille for $100 a ball, winning $900 and the car back.

A particularly poignant moment with the character is seen in the season four episode, "Papa's Got a Brand New Excuse", in which Phil offers Will compassion and a literal shoulder to cry on after Will's father, Lou (portrayed by Ben Vereen), visits and then leaves without Will, breaking a promise to take his son on a cross-country trip. The episode aimed to show Phil at "the height of his protective fatherly tendencies".

=== Character background ===
Philip Zeke Banks was born in Yamacraw, North Carolina on January 30, 1946, to parents Joe and Hattie Joe Banks. He and his family moved to Baltimore, Maryland, when Phil was 16. In one particular episode, entitled "Not with My Pig, You Don't" (originally aired on October 8, 1990), Phil's parents, Hattie (Virginia Capers) and Joe (Gilbert Lewis), come to visit for the weekend when he wins a prestigious award, and inadvertently reveal his humble country roots growing up on a farm in North Carolina. It is shown that Phil was a country boy and never told the family about his secret and that he had a companion pig named Melvin. A journalist (portrayed by Kathy Griffin) comes to the Banks house to interview Phil about his life, but plans to kill the story because she finds him boring after all he talks about is his work. Will, overhearing, tells her stories about Phil's past "barnyard life" he heard from Hattie, including the story about the pig that Phil had a close bond with. This goes down well with the newspaper editors and Phil's parents, but Phil confronts Will about his secret. Hattie overhears Phil angrily berating Will for revealing the truth about his past, and she becomes convinced he is ashamed of his roots, and explains to him that Phil has nothing to be ashamed of, and then is angered to tears. The next night the whole family (including Phil's parents) goes to an awards ceremony for Phil, where he realizes his good fortune to have had such a background and loving parents, and expresses renewed pride in his roots and gratitude for being raised by two devoted parents in his acceptance speech.

After spending his youth as part of the counterculture and social justice movements, Phil eventually attends and graduates from Princeton University, and then Harvard Law School. In 1969, Phil met his wife, Vivian Banks, and the two of them were engaged on Soul Train (revealed during a flashback on the November 7, 1994 episode). During that year, they gave birth to their first daughter and child, Hilary Banks, and on August 4, 1974, five years later, Phil and Vivian gave birth to their second child, and their first son, Carlton Banks who turned out to be very intelligent. The Banks family moved to a run-down Los Angeles neighborhood, and in 1979, the third child, Ashley Banks, was born. Phil by this time had become a wealthy lawyer, with the family living in a mansion in Bel-Air, and in 1990 his nephew Will had moved in with the Banks family.

In the fall of 1992, Phil discovers that Vivian was pregnant with her fourth child, and in 1993 she gave birth to Nicholas Andrew Banks. In the final episode of the series, Will, who is remaining in Los Angeles to attend college, frets about losing the relationship that they have developed, but Phil assures him, "You are my son, end of story".

=== Superior Court judge ===
In the November 16, 1992 episode "Asses to Ashes", Phil's rival Judge Carl Robertson (Sherman Hemsley) had beaten him to the post of Superior Court judge in a landslide vote. The whole Banks family went to City Hall to congratulate Carl, where Will confronted him regarding over-the-top foul play Robertson made against Phil during the campaign. Will went as far to say, "You can just drop dead!" - ironically, Judge Robertson suddenly dies of a massive heart attack seconds later, and after the funeral the governor appointed Phil to the post of Superior Court judge, where he remained for the rest of the series run.

In the final series ending, Phil moves back to the East Coast with his youngest son, Nicky, and wife Vivian.

== Reception ==
The character was ranked number 34 in TV Guide's "50 Greatest TV Dads of All Time".

The role was noted to be Avery's most famous. The cast of the series honored Avery in their 2020 reunion with a collection of clips of the character's best moments on the show.
