= The Fresh Prince Project =

- The Fresh Prince of Bel-Air episode
- Episode no.: Season 1 Episode 1
- Directed by: Debbie Allen
- Written by: Andy Borowitz; Susan Borowitz
- Production code: 446801
- Original air date: September 10, 1990

Guest appearances
- John Petlock as Henry Furth; Helen Page Camp as Margaret Furth

Episode chronology
← Previous —	Next → "Bang the Drum, Ashley"

"The Fresh Prince Project" (also known as simply "Pilot") is the pilot episode of the American sitcom The Fresh Prince of Bel-Air. It aired on NBC in the United States on September 10, 1990, and is written by series co-creators, Andy Borowitz and Susan Borowitz, and directed by Debbie Allen. It guest-stars John Petlock and Helen Page Camp as Henry and Margaret Furth. Tatyana Ali was auditioned in New York City for Quincy Jones to play Ashley when she was 11 years old.

== Plot summary ==
Street-smart teenager Will Smith is living in West Philadelphia with his mother Viola. After he gets into a fight with a bully [later in the show revealed to be named Omar Phelps] following a missed streetball shot that misses the rim and hits the bully's gang, he is sent to live with his wealthy relatives in Bel-Air, the Banks family, so he can learn about hard work, discipline, and get an education in a safe place.

The series picks up right where the opening credits leave off, after the taxi drops Will off at the Banks residence. When he arrives, he mistakes the Banks' butler Geoffrey for his uncle Phil, before being told otherwise. His aunt Vivian and uncle Phil are happy to see him, though Phil is unamused by Will's attire and slang.

After saying hello to his cousins Hilary and Ashley, Will goes to his room to make himself comfortable. Geoffrey comes in and informs him that Philip has invited several of his colleagues from his law firm over for a dinner party. Ashley gives Will a welcome card and the two make a connection as he teaches her how to rap. Philip enters with Will's cousin Carlton, who Will doesn't recognize at first. Phil gives Will advice on how to act at a formal dinner, telling him to 'just do what Carlton does'.

When Will comes downstairs to dinner, he is wearing his cap, tuxedo, a colorful shirt and sneakers. Philip is very embarrassed, but reluctantly introduces Will to his colleagues. Will behaves as he normally does, further embarrassing him. At dinner, Will beat-boxes while rhythmically drumming on glasses with a fork, which annoys Hilary and the rest of the guests. When asked to say grace, Ashley raps it instead of offering a spoken grace. Later that evening after the party, Philip has a talk with Will, scolding him for his behaviour. Will says that Philip does not know how life is on the streets, but Philip objects, telling him that he started his career on the streets of Baltimore. He references Will saying at the beginning of the episode that Malcolm X was his hero, complimenting his Malcolm X poster and saying he heard him speak. Philip makes to leave the living room, but stops and smiles at Will when he sees and hears him play a few bars of Beethoven's "Für Elise" on the piano.

Later that night, Will enters Ashley's room asking if she's seen his Walkman, which she happened to be using. Will asks how many bathrooms the house has, to which she says four and a half. Ashley goes to the two nearest ones and hears Carlton singing, while the other is occupied by Hilary. When Will asks Hilary will she will be long, she says she's trying to remove her makeup. Will and Ashley pretend to go away and hide behind a nearby wall. Hillary opens the door and looks out, she has a towel wrapped around her head and is wearing a bathrobe and a facial scrub mask. Will jumps out and exclaims "I knew it!".

== Cast ==
- Will Smith as himself
- James Avery as Philip Banks
- Janet Hubert as Vivian Banks
- Alfonso Ribeiro as Carlton Banks
- Karyn Parsons as Hilary Banks
- Tatyana M. Ali as Ashley Banks
- Joseph Marcell as Geoffrey Butler
- Helen Page Camp as Margaret Furth
- John Petlock as Henry Furth
