= The Fresh Prince of Bel-Air season 2 =

Season of television series

The Fresh Prince of Bel-Air
- Season 2
- DVD cover
- No. of episodes: 24

Release
- Original network: NBC
- Original release: September 9, 1991 – May 4, 1992

Season chronology
- ← Previous; Season 1 Next → Season 3

The second season of The Fresh Prince of Bel-Air premiered on September 9, 1991, and concluded on May 4, 1992. Following the first season, the set pieces for the Banks mansion where changed to a new design that would be used throughout the rest of the program. The new design involved one large set piece divided between separate but adjacent mansion areas, with emphasis on providing ease on continuous shots between them. In addition, the show's writers provided further additional characters to the Banks family who would have recurring appearances in later seasons.

== Season overview ==
After the success of the first season, production staff decided on a redesign of the sets used to represent the Banks family's mansion. While it had been designed with formality in mind, rooms were done in separate set pieces which required more time filming scenes. The set designers thus created a more robust arrangement that would ease filming - the focus being on creating one continuous set piece divided into separate areas. The new design focused on the mansion having a contemporary aesthics, with a living room adjacent to the kitchen and a conversatory, with a patio garden outside, allowing for the camera to make a continuous shot mostly within the indoor areas between the living room and kitchen.

Plots for the episodes of this season began to start divulging from a focus on Will primarily, as had been in the first season, and more towards a mixture of main plotlines involving him or other members of the family, along with side plots that would be interlaced with the main story. In addition, the show's writers expanded the Banks family, incorporating important topics on family, parental love and respect with episodes that featured the extra character; other episodes touched on additional significant topics, including bullying, cheating, prejudgmental assumption, understanding sex, and friendship.

== Episodes ==
No. overall	No. in season	Title	Directed by	Written by	Original release date	Prod. code	Viewers (millions)
26	1	"Did the Earth Move for You?"	Ellen Falcon	Winifred Hervey Stallworth	September 9, 1991	446901	20.0
The Banks family gets tickets to the People's Choice Awards, but on the way there, an earthquake happens. The parents are stuck in Uncle Phil's workplace, Will and his girlfriend Kathleen (Tisha Campbell) are stuck in the house's basement, and the rest are stuck in traffic. Will finds out more about his newfound love than he wanted to. Kathleen begins to reveal her true self. They decide to break up because they can't be together. This episode is referenced in "M is for the Many Things She Gave Me" in Season 4.
27	2	"The Mother of All Battles"	Ellen Falcon	Bryan Winter	September 16, 1991	446902	19.2
Ashley is being bullied by Paula Hoover (Ebony Monique Solomon) at her school and turns to Will and Carlton for help. Will attempts to teach her how to fight while Carlton tries to teach her how to bribe. Paula and her parents (Tina Lifford and John Wesley) visit Uncle Phil and Aunt Viv and the two sets of parents also clash. The two girls are sitting in the kitchen when they realize that Paula hated Ashley because she bumped into her while she was slow dancing with a boy she liked. Paula thought Ashley did this on purpose, but Ashley says it was because the boy she was dancing with liked Paula and wanted to get closer to her. They then become friends. After a Yo Momma joke directed at Uncle Phil that takes things too far, Uncle Phil punches Paula's father. Philip talks to Ashley about fighting. Meanwhile, Hilary tries redesigning an ugly bridesmaids' dress for her friend Francesca's wedding, only for Francesca and her fiancé to elope, ironically after Hilary finally got the dress design right. Note: The original broadcast was trimmed by two minutes to accommodate the premiere of Will Smith's music video for "Ring My Bell".
28	3	"Will Gets a Job"	Ellen Falcon	Efrem Seeger	September 23, 1991	446903	22.9
Philip mistakes Will for Carlton accidentally several times and offers to pay for Will's Homecoming dance expenses, causing Will to become paranoid that he is becoming exactly like Carlton and totally living off of Uncle Phil's help and money. Will decides to secretly get a job at a pirate-themed restaurant to pay for the Homecoming expenses himself. Will excitedly tells the news to Uncle Phil, who then grounds him for "not telling the truth" for his missing basketball practices, sleeping in class, and skipping school. Ashley knows about this, and takes the family to the restaurant Will works for. Due to the costume, Uncle Phil originally doesn't recognize Will, who tries to get away with some insults. When Uncle Phil tells the pirate server (Will) about how rude he is being, Will takes the costume off. In the end they make up once Uncle Phil realizes why Will wanted to get a job, and Will realizes it is okay to get help from Uncle Phil to succeed. Meanwhile, Carlton has to put up with Ashley's friend Tina after she sees him in a swimsuit. She follows him around until she sees Will in the costume.
29	4	"PSAT Pstory"	Ellen Falcon	Marcus Jamal Gaines	September 30, 1991	446904	20.6
Will is a picture of confidence, while Carlton is a frazzled bundle of nerves over preparing for college aptitude tests. Carlton is basing his whole future on one test score, while Will does not think too much of it. Will beats Carlton, scoring in the 91% tier (116) while Carlton scores in the 90% tier (114). Carlton pesters Will about the scores and tries to say what could have gone wrong, and concludes that his nervousness distracted him. The next week, during a pop quiz by Coach Smiley, Carlton copies Will's paper when the pressure gets to him. He is caught by Coach Smiley and sent to the headmaster's office. Will tricks the coach into thinking Carlton had a sports injury where he could move his neck toward Will when faced with stress. They believe this, until Carlton thanks Will for getting him out of trouble for cheating and they get caught; Philip grounds them both. Meanwhile, Geoffrey works hard towards getting a raise by cooking and planning a blueprint for a gazebo. When he only gets $20 a week, he quits. The family tries to bring him back and offers him $100 a week; he takes it and Uncle Phil apologizes for taking him for granted.
30	5	"Granny Gets Busy"	Ellen Falcon	Cheryl Gard	October 7, 1991	446906	20.6
Hattie comes over to the Banks' place for a while. Everyone introduces Hattie to a neighbor, Mrs. Sweeting, who is very boring. That night, Vivian wants to have sex with Phil and bought a brand new nightgown, when he notices a note on the bed saying Hattie went over to play cards with the neighbor. Philip goes to check on her, but he is shocked when he spies on her and finds her kissing Ed Downer (Lee Weaver), the handyman. The next night, they talk and they both realize that after a year of being a widow, it's time for Hattie to start dating again. Meanwhile, Will and Carlton have a bet with Hilary and Ashley to see who can do something that the opposite gender can do better. Will and Carlton must sew a dress and Hilary and Ashley must build an exercise bike. It ends in a tie as both sides complete their tasks perfectly.
31	6	"Guess Who's Coming to Marry?"	Ellen Falcon	Samm-Art Williams	October 14, 1991	446905	22.2
Tensions spill over just before the wedding of Will's Aunt Janice (Charlayne Woodard), when Will's mom meets Janice's intended husband, Frank (Diedrich Bader) who is a white man. Although everyone else is willing to accept Janice's decision, Vy refuses to do so and decides not to attend the interracial wedding, and forbids Will too, even though he's in the ceremony. However, through Will's advices about not controlling everything and that she shouldn’t stop loving family just because of choices or opinions, Vy is convinced to go to Janice's wedding and accepts her decision as she happily marries Frank.
32	7	"The Big Four-Oh"	Ellen Falcon	Lisa Rosenthal	October 21, 1991	446907	23.0
The kids put on a 40th birthday party for Vivian, but this only makes her think life is passing her by. She rethinks her past and what some of her goals were. She remembers back to a time when her soul and main purpose was to be a dancer. When she takes dance lessons, she is intimidated by the young, athletic women. However, she dedicates herself to dance and nails an audition. She had put her all in it, fainting upon leaving. Vivian decides to return to her job as a professor, realizing her love of teaching is not a life wasted.
33	8	"She Ain't Heavy"	Ellen Falcon	Lisa Rosenthal	November 4, 1991	446908	24.4
Will is getting tickets to a Lakers basketball game when Uncle Phil decides to give the other tickets to one of his clients' daughter. Will hits it off with the full-figured friend named Dee Dee (Queen Latifah), but her size keeps Will from asking her to the dance. Though Will likes her, he takes the shallow way out as soon as his friends start teasing him. At a pizza place, his friends from the place and school make fun of her size, which Dee Dee hears it when she comes out of the washroom. She ignores Will for a while. He has a very boring date who talks too much, and so does Dee Dee. When he sees her at the dance with another guy, he sees more clearly that it's what's on the inside that counts more than the outside.
34	9	"Cased Up"	Ellen Falcon	Bennie R. Richburg, Jr.	November 11, 1991	446909	25.5
Hilary finally meets the man Uncle Phil has wanted her to date, Eric (Malcolm-Jamal Warner). He is young, dashing, rich, and the things that Hilary is looking for in a man. All is going well until there is a small car accident caused by Will's new car. Since Will is underage and uninsured, Uncle Phil gets sued as he is the in loco parentis guardian of Will.
35	10	"Hi-Ho Silver"	Ellen Falcon	Elaine Newman & Ed Burnham	November 18, 1991	446910	25.1
When Viv has a guest over and the silverware goes missing, Will and Carlton assume the silver has been stolen by the guest, Sonya L'Amour (Zsa Zsa Gabor) a famous TV star. Will and Carlton do a little investigating in her house to find the culprit. They notice she has the same cutlery used by Sonya. They steal back the silverware and return home to explain the good news, only to realize the caterer brought back the stolen silverware and they stole Sonya's. They then have to sneak back into Sonya's and return the spoons and forks.
36	11	"The Butler Did It"	Ellen Falcon	Efrem Seeger and Bryan Winter	November 25, 1991	446911	25.6
Geoffrey and the parents are away for a while, leaving the kids alone. Ashley's attempt to drive her Girl Scout troop ends in fail. Bell Biv DeVoe, as themselves, shoot a video at the Banks', courtesy of Carlton, who rents out the house while his parents are away. There are multiple interruptions: Will walks into their music video shoot, Ashley's Girl Scouts walk in (they are all huge fans of them), and Will and Tyriq dance into the shoot. All the furniture is taken outside to make space for the shoot. It then starts to rain, causing everything to get soaking wet. At their hotel, Uncle Phil and Aunt Viv are very cross at their neighbor because he is buying out the bellboys, leaving them to do their own work. The neighbor ends up being Geoffrey. They then decide to return early, leaving kids to scramble to put the house back in order.
37	12	"Something for Nothing"	Ellen Falcon	Bill Streib	December 9, 1991	446912	24.1
Will and his young friend Ramon (Brandon Quintin Adams) play basketball often. Ramon tells Will about how he's currently doing little jobs around the area to get money for basketball camp. Hilary is in charge of preparing a Monte Carlo-themed fundraiser night for the country club. Will really shows that he has luck in his favor by winning high amounts of money on every turn. He also wins a prize of $1000. He learns that he must give the money back as a donation for a special charity as a tradition. Will refuses to give it back and breaks the decade-long tradition. Uncle Phil demands that Will give it back; instead of giving it to the club, he gives it to Ramon for basketball camp. Phil commends Will on his charitable decision and tells him that he plans to donate money to the club.
38	13	"Christmas Show"	Ellen Falcon	Winifred Hervey Stallworth	December 16, 1991	446913	23.0
On a family ski trip, the kids are left in their rental cabin alone while the adults are parting at the ski lodge. Will is persuaded by Hilary, Carlton, and Ashley to let a stranger in their cabin. Will records him saying "Merry Christmas" to the camera. The stranger then says "Nobody move, this is a stick up!" and the camera irises out. The stranger steals everything and leaves them with nothing, so they must find a way to give gifts from the heart. Carlton is traumatized about it and realizes that life isn't some game and learns to cherish it and love everyone. Meanwhile, Vivian, Hilary, Helen and Vy find out that Janice, who's been throwing up and hasn't been feeling well, is pregnant. However, wanting to be sure before telling Frank, Janice takes Hilary suggestions of a home pregnancy test, which tested positive. Janice happily tells Frank the news as he and the rest of the family are all happy for them. Also, Will finds out that his mother, Vy, has a boyfriend as he asks her questions about him.
39	14	"Hilary Gets a Life"	Shelley Jensen	Eunetta T. Boone & P. Karen Raper	January 6, 1992	446914	25.3
After viewing the credit card bill, Phil snaps Hilary's credit cards in half to prevent her from over-spending anymore on shoes. Not knowing what to do or how to look for a job, Hilary asks Will and his friend Tyriq to help her. Will lies on her application for her, getting her a job as a caterer.
40	15	"My Brother's Keeper"	Ellen Falcon	Bennie R. Richburg, Jr.	January 13, 1992	446915	25.9
On the basketball court, winning is everything to Will, as it is to an opponent from Malibu Prep, Marcus Stokes (Allen Payne) who can't afford to lose due to his need for a scholarship. Will always goes for pre-game haircuts to add a little spice to his game and there he learns that Marcus was very poor growing up. Marcus comes in with his toddler son. Will thinks how hard it must be to have a child and to have so much pressure for his education, family, and scholarship. Will is torn between wanting the glory of winning for himself and letting the other player have his chance at success. He lets Marcus beat him by pretending to miss an easy chance to stop him. After the game, Will learns that even though Marcus loves basketball with a burning passion, he needs his scholarship for education opportunities and that's what he'll use to take care of his family, a good job that lasts a lifetime. He also mentions that if anyone offers him great amounts of money for dribbling a basketball then he'll take it. Will and Marcus then play a friendly game of basketball.
41	16	"Geoffrey Cleans Up"	Ellen Falcon	Cheryl Gard and Lisa Rosenthal	January 20, 1992	446916	24.7
Geoffrey falls hard for Karen Carruthers (Anna Maria Horsford), a neighbor he believes is a housekeeper, but turns out to be very wealthy. Phillip is losing clients and Carlton helps him make him younger by wearing a toupee. Phillip decides to let him be himself and punishes Carlton for changing him.
42	17	"Community Action"	Ellen Falcon	Eunetta T. Boone & P. Karen Raper	February 3, 1992	446917	23.2
When Hilary is ordered to do community service at a free clinic, the doctor in charge becomes the antidote for her marriage-mindedness. When his apartment building is being fumigated, Jazz stays at the Banks' house, where he abuses their generosity by sleeping in the pool house with Carlton's supposed girlfriend, stealing Uncle Phil's bathrobe and Ashley's CD player. When Geoffrey gets sick, Jazz decides to become the butler for the Bankses, failing miserably.
43	18	"Ill Will"	Ellen Falcon	Leslie Ray and David Steven Simon	February 10, 1992	446918	22.9
Will fears the scalpel when he enters the hospital for a tonsillectomy, while the family fears a steamy exposé when Geoffrey begins to write his memoirs. Will meets his roommate, Max Jakey (Milton Berle), a comedian who is lively despite being sick. Will has a nightmare where he gets treated by incompetent doctors (Doctor Dré as himself, John Beradino as Dr. Steve Hardy, and Bernie Kopell as Dr. Adam Bricker). In fear, he disguises himself and sneaks out of the hospital. Meanwhile, in fear that Geoffrey's memoir might tell their secrets, Carlton and Hilary sneak into Geoffrey's room to try to find his memoirs. When Phil and Vivian enter the room, Carlton and Hilary hide under the bed, where they find Will. When Phil sits on the bed, the three reveal themselves. Phil sends Will back to the hospital. When he finds that Max isn't in the room, the nurse (Debra Mooney) tells Will that Max "went to a better place". Will, thinking Max died, shames himself for his cowardly actions and gains the confidence to get through the surgery. After Will's surgery, Geoffrey gives him a copy of his memoirs, which the Banks fight over trying to get it. Geoffrey reveals that his literary agent rejected the memoirs. Max shows up, much to the surprise of Will. Max explains that he was simply transferring to another hospital, Cedars-Sinai, having come back to retrieve his "lucky hat", which he usually drops on purpose and makes nurses pick it up so he can look at their behinds. However, Max changes his mind and decides to give it to Will.
44	19	"Eyes on the Prize"	Ellen Falcon	Bryan Winter	February 17, 1992	446919	23.5
Needing a game show partner, Will must choose between his bickering friends Jazz and Tyriq. Meanwhile, Philip tries to fix the kitchen sink himself to get the water running.
45	20	"Those Were the Days"	Rita Rogers Blye	Samm-Art Williams	February 24, 1992	446920	24.1
Philip and Vivian welcome their old friend, a '60s radical named Marge (Peggy Blow), who arouses the FBI's interest and influences Will and Carlton to take action over the firing of a nonconformist teacher. When Will gets suspended for locking himself in a classroom, Philip and Vivian have an argument with Marge, who assumes that Philip had forgotten his past. Philip sternly assures her that he has matured, choosing not to fight in the streets anymore as he has an office to fight from. Will tries to go the same path as Marge until she tells him that he has to find his own way. An FBI agent (Tim Russ) visits the Banks and asks Philip and Vivian where Marge was. The both of them, plus Will and Hilary, list different locations to make it seem like they didn't know where Marge was going.
46	21	"Vying for Attention"	Malcolm-Jamal Warner	Efrem Seeger	March 2, 1992	446921	24.6
Vy visits the house with her new boyfriend Robert (Bill Overton) and his daughter Claudia (Raven-Symoné). Will dislikes Robert though he does everything to get Will to accept him. As it turns out, Will is afraid of sharing his mother with someone else until he runs away and His mom talks to him about her life.
47	22	"The Aunt Who Came to Dinner"	Rae Kraus	Jerry Ross	March 23, 1992	446922	24.5
Aunt Helen (Jenifer Lewis) arrives unexpectedly and upsets Will and Carlton's plans for a rendezvous with two gorgeous French women and the parents plans for a Jazz Festival. Aunt Helen needed some time alone after she noticed that her husband Lester (Felton Perry) might be seeing another woman. It turns out, it was his psychiatrist.
48	23	"Be My Baby Tonight"	Shelley Jensen	Bryan Winter and Lisa Rosenthal	April 27, 1992	446923	20.0
Ashley cringes when the family oohs and aahs over her relationship with her boyfriend Kevin. They both have these "feelings and emotions" about having sex with each other. Ashley keeps trying to ask Will about sex but he keeps choking every time. He and Carlton visit the pregnancy counseling center to learn how to give a proper sex talk. Ashley learns that it is okay to have questions at her age and Aunt Viv and Uncle Phil answer them.
49	24	"Striptease for Two"	Shelley Jensen	Leslie Ray & David Steven Simon	May 4, 1992	446924	21.0
Vivian tells Will and Carlton to get her bracelet fixed. They pawn the bracelet, Will, Carlton and Geoffrey take investing on an insider trading tip and They lose their shirts by taking jobs as strippers to recoup their losses and get Vivian's bracelet back. Phillip found out what they did and tells them to get the bracelet back. They need to get the bracelet back or they would be in bigger trouble.
