= Courting Disaster =

Courting Disaster may refer to:

- Courting Disaster (comic), a webcomic by Brad Guigar
- Courting Disaster (novel), a Nancy Drew and Hardy Boys novel
- "Courting Disaster" (The Fresh Prince of Bel-Air), a 1990 television episode
- "Courting Disaster!" (The Raccoons), a 1987 television episode
- "Courting Disaster" (Will & Grace), a 2004 television episode
