= Talking Turkey =

Talking Turkey may refer to:

- "Talking Turkey" (The Fresh Prince of Bel-Air), a 1990 television episode
- "Talking Turkey" (Oh, Doctor Beeching!), a 1996 television episode
- Talking Turkeys, a children's poetry book by Benjamin Zephaniah
