= Aliens in the Family =

American family science fantasy sitcom (1996)

- Genre: Sitcom; Science fantasy
- Created by: Andy Borowitz; Susan Borowitz
- Written by: Susan Borowitz; Andy Borowitz; Patricia Marx; Charlie Rubin
- Directed by: Tom Trbovich
- Starring: John Bedford Lloyd; Margaret Trigg
- Theme music composer: Todd Rundgren
- Composers: Joe Carroll; Peter Thom
- Country of origin: United States
- Original language: English
- No. of seasons: 1
- No. of episodes: 8

Production
- Executive producers: Andy Borowitz; Susan Borowitz; Brian Henson
- Producer: Ritamarie Peruggi
- Running time: 22–24 minutes
- Production companies: Jim Henson Productions; The Stuffed Dog Company

Original release
- Network: ABC
- Release: March 15 – August 31, 1996

Aliens in the Family is an American science fantasy sitcom that aired on ABC from March 15 to August 31, 1996, conceived as part of its TGIF lineup.

== Premise ==
The show was about single dad Doug Brody (John Bedford Lloyd), who is abducted by single alien mom Cookie (Margaret Trigg). The two fall in love, get married, and try to live a normal life on Earth as a mixed family.

== Cast ==
- John Bedford Lloyd as Doug Brody
- Margaret Trigg as Cookie Brody
- Paige Tiffany as Heather Brody
- Chris Marquette as Adam Brody
- Julie Dretzin as Sally Hagen

=== Puppeteers ===
- Alice Dinnean as Snizzy (face and voice)
- Michael Gilden as Snizzy (body)
- John Kennedy as Bobut (face)
- Bruce Lanoil as Spit (face)
- Peter Linz as Varch, Elder of the Nertron Galactic Federation (in "Respect Your Elders"), Red Yukkle (in "Dissected and Neglected")
- Joey Mazzarino as Spit (voice), Green and Yellow Yukkles (in "Dissected and Neglected")
- David Rudman as Bobut (body and voice), Orange and Purple Yukkles (in "Dissected and Neglected")
- Michelan Sisti as Spit (body)

== Production ==
The series was created, written and executive produced by Andy and Susan Borowitz. Brian Henson, son of Jim Henson, also served as co-executive producer. The series theme song was written and performed by Todd Rundgren. The series was shot in its entirety at Lifetime Studios in New York City.

== Episodes ==
No.	Title	Directed by	Written by	Original release date	Prod. code	Viewers (millions)
1	"Meet the Brodys"	Tom Trbovich	Andy Borowitz & Susan Borowitz	March 15, 1996	1AIF01	13.6
2	"Bobut Conquers All"	Tom Trbovich	Susan Borowitz & Andy Borowitz	March 22, 1996	1AIF02	12.7
3	"Cookie Makes Some Dough"	Tom Trbovich	Susan Borowitz & Andy Borowitz	July 27, 1996	1AIF03	N/A
4	"You Don't Have a Pet to Be Popular"	Tom Trbovich	Susan Borowitz & Andy Borowitz	August 3, 1996	1AIF04	N/A
5	"Too Good to Be True"	Tom Trbovich	Patricia Marx	August 10, 1996	1AIF05	N/A
6	"Respect Your Elders"	Tom Trbovich	Susan Borowitz & Andy Borowitz	August 17, 1996	1AIF06	N/A
7	"Dissected and Neglected"	Tom Trbovich	Charlie Rubin	August 24, 1996	1AIF07	N/A
8	"A Very Brody Tweeznax"	Tom Trbovich	Susan Borowitz & Andy Borowitz	August 31, 1996	1AIF08	N/A

== Cancellation ==
The show premiered on March 15, 1996; ABC pulled the series from its TGIF lineup after two weeks, replacing the show's scheduled third airing with re-runs of other TGIF programs. The show did not return for over four months and aired the rest of its episodes on Saturday mornings in the summer of 1996.
