= The Fresh Prince of Bel-Air season 1 =

The Fresh Prince of Bel-Air
- Season 1
- DVD cover
- No. of episodes: 25

Release
- Original network: NBC
- Original release: September 10, 1990 – May 6, 1991

Season chronology
- Next → Season 2

The first season of The Fresh Prince of Bel-Air premiered on September 10, 1990, and concluded on May 6, 1991. The season focuses on Will Smith arriving to live with his wealthy relatives at their Bel Air mansion, and his adaptation to living with them and his cousins, alongside his impact on their lives with various issues.

== Season overview ==
The Fresh Prince Project, the show's pilot, focuses on Will's move to Bel Air, following a fight with some gang members in West Philadelphia when playing basketball; the opening intro credits, which provide a brief overlay of his move, originally featured an extended song piece for the first couple of episodes, before being reduced to the song more commonly associated to the program.

The season itself focuses on Will's impact on the lives of his relatives and his adjustment to their way of life, including: Phillip Banks, Will's strict and gruff uncle; Vivian Banks, Will's no-nonsense, forthright, and career-minded aunt; Carlton Banks, Will's smart but overbearingly naive cousin; Ashley Banks, Will's cousin and the youngest of the Banks children; Hilary Banks, Will's dim-witted, shallow and impulsive cousin, and the eldest of the Banks children; and Geoffrey, the Banks family's English Butler.

Significant plot points in the season focus on the development of Will's part in Ashley's childhood and the bond he forms with her, his relationship with Carlton including his attitude and behaviour towards his cousin, and the clash of personalities with Philips' desire to form a perfect family in their wealthy neighbourhood and Will's desire to bring some normality to it. Some of stories written for the season notably touched on significant topics such as family roots, racial profiling, honesty, growing up, and equal rights.

== Episodes ==
| No. overall | No. in season | Title | Directed by | Written by | Original release date | Prod. code | Viewers (millions) |
|---|---|---|---|---|---|---|---|
| 1 | 1 | "The Fresh Prince Project" | Debbie Allen | Andy Borowitz & Susan Borowitz | September 10, 1990 | 446801 | 20.1 |
Street-smart teenager Will Smith is living in West Philadelphia with his mother Viola. While playing basketball, Will misses a shot and hits a group of gang members, causing a confrontation that frightens his mother. As a result, he is sent to live with his aunt and uncle in their Bel Air mansion so he can learn hard work and discipline in a safe place. The pilot picks up where it left off after the opening credits, where Will arrives in a taxi and knocks on the Banks' door. Will meets the Banks family and clashes with nearly all of them. He doesn't get along with his uncle Philip, his aunt Vivian defends him, his big cousin Hilary looks down on him, his cousin Carlton, who is of similar age, wants to bond with him, and his little cousin Ashley looks up to him. However, things come to a clash when Ashley raps the dinner prayer during an elegant party, shocking her father, as well as Will.
| 2 | 2 | "Bang the Drum, Ashley" | Debbie Allen | Shannon Gaughan | September 17, 1990 | 446802 | 19.6 |
After Ashley reveals to Will that she does not enjoy playing the violin, he takes her to a pawn shop in East LA and swaps her violin in for a drum kit. He tries to ease the blow to Philip and Vivian by also getting them gifts before revealing Ashley's new music teacher, his friend Jazz. But the constant drumming angers everyone.
| 3 | 3 | "Clubba Hubba" | Jeff Melman | Rob Edwards | September 24, 1990 | 446805 | 21.0 |
Will tries to impress Dr. Mumford (Richard Roundtree), so he can date his daughter Mimi (Victoria Rowell). Philip, Carlton and Geoffrey each try to teach Will how to be a gentleman. While he impresses Dr. Mumford as "Kipp Smithers", Will finds out that Mimi prefers bad boys "from the hood". Will spends the night alternating between his images before realizing being himself is more important than impressing others.
| 4 | 4 | "Not with My Pig, You Don't" | Jeff Melman | Lisa Rosenthal | October 1, 1990 | 446806 | 19.9 |
Philip's parents, Hattie (Virginia Capers) and Joe (Gilbert Lewis) come to visit for the weekend when he wins a prestigious award who inadvertently reveal his humble country roots growing up on a farm in North Carolina. A journalist (Kathy Griffin), comes to the Banks' house to interview Philip about his life, but plans to kill the story because she finds him boring after all he talks about is his work. Will, overhearing, tells her stories about Philip's past "barnyard life" he heard from Hattie, including a story about a pig named Melvin that Philip had a close bond with. This goes down well with the newspaper editors and Philip's parents, but Hattie overhears Philip angrily berating Will for revealing the truth about his past, and she becomes convinced he is ashamed of his roots. At the dinner, Philip makes his acceptance speech where he shows renewed pride in his roots and gratitude for being raised by two devoted parents.
| 5 | 5 | "Homeboy, Sweet Homeboy" | Jeff Melman | Samm-Art Williams | October 8, 1990 | 446804 | 22.7 |
Will gets a visit from an old friend named "Ice Tray" (Don Cheadle), who, to Vivian and Philip's dismay, warms up to Hilary. Philip and Vivian try and discourage Hilary from falling in love with him by finding great warmth to the idea until she jokingly says she just married him to gauge their reaction, which is an outrage. Will confides to Vivian just how good a friend Ice Tray had been to him when he was the only studious kid from a class of dropouts in Philadelphia. Vivian says that it is commendable Ice Tray stuck up for Will, but rhetorically asks how concerned was Ice Tray for his own welfare. Will revealed that Ice Tray had no one around for him and eventually stopped caring about himself, adding on that he [Will] too would've been like that if Ice Tray wasn't there for him.
| 6 | 6 | "Mistaken Identity" | Jeff Melman | Susan Borowitz & Andy Borowitz | October 15, 1990 | 446807 | 19.4 |
While Philip and Vivian go on a trip to Palm Springs in Mrs. Furth's helicopter, Will and Carlton are paid to drive Mr. Furth's Mercedes there as well. They get pulled over for "stealing" the car. Luckily, Will is able to get Philip and Vivian's attention by making a phony confession on TV and he and Carlton are acquitted, Phillip even going so far as to lambaste the officers on duty for immediately writing the two off as criminals instead of going through the proper procedures. This turns into an argument between Will and Carlton about racial profiling after they get home with Carlton insisting that the legal system is not flawed, but when Philip recounts a similar experience, Carlton thinks it over with himself. Meanwhile, Hilary babysits Ashley and proves to be an unhealthy influence on the young girl when she gives her too much coffee. Guest cast: John Petlock as Henry Furth, Helen Page Camp as Margaret Furth, Dan Desmond as Sergeant, Hank Azaria as Policeman, Raymond McLeod as Bob, Anthony Auer as Newscaster and Donald Grant as Lawyer.
| 7 | 7 | "Def Poet's Society" | Jeff Melman | John Bowman | October 22, 1990 | 446808 | 19.3 |
The family pressures Will to join an after school club. Following the girls into a poetry class, he spontaneously makes up a poem on the spot to impress them and claims it was written by a reclusive poet named "Raphael de la Ghetto", a name he made up there and then. Impressed, Christina asks to bring him to Poetry Night and after Jazz doesn't come through with an impostor, Will turns to Geoffrey to masquerade.
| 8 | 8 | "Someday Your Prince Will Be in Effect" | Jeff Melman | Story by : Bennie Richburg, Jr. Teleplay by : Cheryl Gard & Shannon Gaughan | October 29, 1990 | 446810A | 21.9 |
| 9 | 9 | "Someday Your Prince Will Be in Effect" | Jeff Melman | Story by : Bennie Richburg, Jr. Teleplay by : Cheryl Gard & Shannon Gaughan | October 29, 1990 | 446810B | 21.9 |
Part 1: The family heads to the mall to pick up costumes for Hilary's Halloween party, while Will and Carlton place a bet to see who can find a date for the party. Philip gets held up at a gadget store. Vivian sings in a recording booth, where she receives positive feedback and a large audience standing outside listening to her. When Hilary forgets to take a hat off of Ashley and walks out of the store with it, they are accused of shoplifting. Will and Carlton both spot a woman, Melinda, and run to her, ending the episode on a cliffhanger. Part 2: Will and Carlton both try to win Melinda over by making up stories about themselves. Carlton successfully wins her over, much to Will's surprise. Will goes and drowns his sorrows in croissants, where he asks the nerdy waitress, Cindy, out to Hilary's party. Hilary's party starts off great until Carlton's date turns out to be a thief, and the shoplifter Hilary was accused of being. Guest appearances by Quincy Jones, Malcolm-Jamal Warner, Kadeem Hardison, Bo Jackson, Heavy D and Al B. Sure!.
| 10 | 10 | "Kiss My Butler" | Rita Rogers Blye | Sandy Frank | November 5, 1990 | 446809 | 20.2 |
It is Geoffrey's birthday and Will decides to set him up on a blind date with an English woman named Helen (Naomi Campbell) as a gift. Will, thinking she is better for him, figures she will be turned off by his stodgy attitude. However, Geoffrey ends up having a great time with her. Geoffrey also gives Will an insight about prejudging others and that some men view birthdays as a time to reflect on one's life, not party.
| 11 | 11 | "Courting Disaster" | Jeff Melman | Sandy Frank & Lisa Rosenthal | November 12, 1990 | 446811 | 24.3 |
Will joins the school basketball team, of which Carlton is already a member. Will becomes the star player of the team, causing Carlton to become jealous and Will lets his popularity go to his head, and constantly makes a spectacle of himself on the court. At the peak of his jealousy, Carlton decides to steal the ball from Will and take the game's winning shot, though he misses, costing the team the game. Both Will and Carlton learn their lessons back at the house after Uncle Phil berates Carlton and Will, scolding Will for making an exhibition of himself on the court, and reminding them that real players play with the team.
| 12 | 12 | "Talking Turkey" | Jeff Melman | Cheryl Gard | November 19, 1990 | 446812 | 21.1 |
Will's mom, Vy (Vernee Watson-Johnson), comes to the Banks household for Thanksgiving. She gets angry that the kids leave all of the work to Geoffrey and criticizes her sister that she wanted Will to be in a safe environment, but not a pampered one. Vivian then decides to make the kids cook Thanksgiving dinner to show how hard other people work to provide for them. Carlton also invites his English teacher to the dinner. However, when the kids make multiple errors, Vy laughs maybe that lesson was not ideal.
| 13 | 13 | "Knowledge Is Power" | Jeff Melman | Rob Edwards | November 26, 1990 | 446813 | 21.3 |
In order to get the family car instead of Will, Hilary tells Phil that Will has been disobeying curfew, subcontracting his chores to Ashley and renting out the family car. He is consequently grounded for a month. Will plans revenge; while going to find out where Hilary is shopping, he learns that she dropped out of college three months ago. Will uses this in order to get Hilary to slave for him during his punishment. Hilary tries to get Carlton to go against Will, but instead he blackmails her too. Carlton and Will both have lists of embarrassing tasks that Hilary must do at the dinner table. When this proves too much pressure for Hilary, she admits she dropped out. Her parents have a long talk with her about her path in life, but also come down on Will and Carlton for their blackmail, giving Will another month of confinement. In the end, Will admits to Hilary that he wasn't planning to tell her parents about dropping out of college as he was trying to teach her a lesson about ratting him out, which she gets and learned from it.
| 14 | 14 | "Day Damn One" | Jeff Melman | Cheryl Gard | December 3, 1990 | 446803 | 22.5 |
Ashley and her friends ask Will to tell a scary story at their slumber party before they go to sleep. Will tells the tale of his first day at Bel-Air Academy and how he carved his name into a desk that the first students of the school carved into.
| 15 | 15 | "Deck the Halls" | Jeff Melman | Shannon Gaughan | December 10, 1990 | 446814 | 19.1 |
Will realizes that Ashley has never experienced a real Christmas before (since back in Philadelphia, there would be carolers, lights and neat decorations, while in Bel-Air there are only a few decorations, no carolers, and hardly anything in the Christmas spirit) and goes out of his way to let her have one. He decorates the inside of the house and also the outside with hundreds of lights, decor, and colors; upsetting some of the neighbors, to include Evander Holyfield.
| 16 | 16 | "Lucky Charm" | Jeff Melman | Samm-Art Williams | January 7, 1991 | 446816 | 22.2 |
Due to a couple of coincidences, one of Philip's clients, a very superstitious businessman, thinks Will is his good luck charm. He befriends Will, who is allowed to decide on some of his major decisions in the stock market. Will does not seem to mind, especially when given corporate perks, but Philip warns this could take a turn for the worse.
| 17 | 17 | "The Ethnic Tip" | Jeff Melman | Benny Medina & Jeff Pollack | January 14, 1991 | 446815 | 22.6 |
Will proposes a black history class be instituted at Bel-Air Academy, and expects an easy A when Vivian volunteers to teach it. Many of the students enjoy her ways of teaching, except Will and Carlton when she gives them extra homework to do. At the end of the course, Vivian explains that she gave the two extra homework because as the only two black students in class she thought they'd get more from the course. When Will says he has read The Autobiography of Malcolm X, to which Vivian retorts there is more and unless he learns the full history behind the struggle for equal rights, then he all he has done is trivialize it. The show closes with a Malcolm X quote which reads: "Education is the passport to the future, for tomorrow belongs for those who prepare for it today."
| 18 | 18 | "The Young and the Restless" | Jeff Melman | Lisa Rosenthal | January 21, 1991 | 446817 | 20.6 |
Philip's mother joins the family for the weekend after recovering from a cold. Philip wants her to relax for the weekend but she has other ideas. Will exposes her to some rap music by Heavy D, which she really likes. She and Will then sneak out to go to a Heavy D concert, which the family tracks them down and aren't too happy about it.
| 19 | 19 | "It Had to Be You" | Jeff Melman | Cheryl Gard | February 4, 1991 | 446818 | 20.7 |
Jazz asks Will the favor of taking his sister Janet (Vivica A. Fox) out on a date after she moves into town. Will does so reluctantly, until Jazz introduces the two. Will takes Janet on a date, but learns that she's extremely bossy and has her whole life planned out for the pair already. Janet tells Will what to do, where to go and how to look, and criticizes Will for every little thing. Jazz recommends that if Will doesn't like her he should introduce her to someone else. He does so to Carlton at a club. When Janet displays her rudeness, Carlton sternly tells her he expects his dates to be courteous and respectful to others, which surprisingly causes her and Carlton to become a nice couple.
| 20 | 20 | "Nice Lady" | Jeff Melman | Sandy Frank | February 11, 1991 | 446819 | 19.6 |
Geoffrey's old employer Lord Fowler and his daughter Lady Penelope (Sherrié Austin) come to the Banks' house for the weekend. Will wants to use the car to go to a Ziggy Marley concert in Nevada, but Philip and Vivian make it conditional on the basis he not cause any trouble while they are hosting their guests. When Will decides to take on the responsibility of escorting Lady Penelope to the opera, he finds that he has his hands full when she sneaks out to a rough club in L.A. and cavorts with bikers.
| 21 | 21 | "Love at First Fight" | Jeff Melman | Lisa Rosenthal & Samm-Art Williams | February 18, 1991 | 446820 | 25.5 |
One of Vivian's students, Kayla Samuels (Jasmine Guy) comes over for dinner and Will tries to impress her but fails. Eventually, Will wins her over and inadvertently starts taking time away from her studies so Vivian tells him to cut back on their relationship so Kayla can have a good future. Vivian winds up lecturing Kayla and revealing things about her own struggles to be successful.
| 22 | 22 | "Banks Shot" | Jeff Melman | Bennie Richburg, Jr. | February 25, 1991 | 446821 | 21.2 |
Vivian goes away to Berkeley for the weekend, leaving Hilary in charge. When Will steals the car keys to go to the pool hall, and winds up losing his money and the car to a hustler, Philip must go down to rescue him. There he acts like he's never played pool before and lets the hustlers win. They then play again with Philip's signature cue named Lucille for $100 a ball in which Geoffrey gives to him. He then greatly wins over the hustlers (totalling to $900) and gets the car back. Hilary acts as a tyrant to Carlton and Ashley when she is left in charge.
| 23 | 23 | "72 Hours" | Rae Kraus | Rob Edwards | March 11, 1991 | 446822 | 20.8 |
Will makes a bet that Carlton wouldn't last a weekend in Jazz's neighborhood, Compton, because of the way he is. Carlton takes the bet too far by becoming very thug-like, wearing colorful clothing, shades, and bandanas (like Will), and Will has to find a way to stop him from going to MacArthur Park at night. He then rats on him to the parents, and they go to rescue him before going to the park. At the house, Carlton wins the bet, and the reason he won is because Will cared about him and didn't want him to possibly die at the park that night.
| 24 | 24 | "Just Infatuation" | Jeff Melman | Jeff Pollack & Benny Medina | April 29, 1991 | 446824 | 18.8 |
Ashley's birthday is nearing and when the family asks her what she would like for her birthday, she shows them a picture of Little T (Tevin Campbell), the popular teen singer. Hilary knows T's agent so she has him come to Ashley's birthday party to perform a song for her. They hit it off and set up a date for the next day. Will and Carlton disagree with the date, so they decide to follow them on their date. They find out that all the things they heard about him were false and let them continue on with their date. At the house, as Ashley is adjusting her hair, Will thinks back to the time he taught her how to rap and how she is already growing up fast.
| 25 | 25 | "Working It Out" | Rita Rogers Blye | Shannon Gaughan | May 6, 1991 | 446823 | 19.1 |
Hilary lands a new job as an assistant to an actress, Marissa Redman (Queen Latifah) who turns out to be verbally abusive. Will surprises Hilary with Jazz in the office and Marissa takes a liking to Will, wanting to bring him to a restaurant opening and threatens Hilary with being fired in order to set up the date. Will agrees, but only if Hilary goes on a date with Jazz. Marissa gets mad at Hilary for not giving someone champagne when Jazz acts up and gets mad at Marissa for talking to Hilary like that. At home, Hilary thanks Jazz by kissing him.
