= Phoebe Snetsinger =

American birder

- Born: Phoebe Geddes Burnett; June 9, 1931; Lake Zurich, Illinois, US
- Died: November 23, 1999 (aged 68); Madagascar
- Education: Swarthmore College
- Known for: Birding
- Notable work: Birding on Borrowed Time
- Spouse: David Snetsinger
- Children: 4
- Parent: Leo Burnett (father)

Phoebe Snetsinger (née Burnett; June 9, 1931 – November 23, 1999) was an American birder famous for having seen and documented birds of 8,398 different species, more than anyone else in history at the time, and for being the first person to see more than 8,000. Her memoir, Birding on Borrowed Time, explores this achievement. She traveled the world multiple times to find birds in their habitats. She was described as having had an excellent memory and a strong competitive spirit.

After receiving a melanoma diagnosis at age 50, Snetsinger took up birding avidly, becoming known as a sharp observer who kept detailed notes. Her multiple expeditions around the world to often remote locations occasionally proved to be dangerous. Initially driven to join the competition of seeing the most birds by the prognosis that her cancer was fatal, she died in a vehicle accident while birding in Madagascar about 18 years after the diagnosis.

== Early life, family and education ==
Phoebe Burnett was born on June 9, 1931, to Naomi Geddes and Leo Burnett and was raised in Lake Zurich, Illinois. Leo Burnett was a giant in the advertising industry. From him, she inherited many traits and a considerable fortune after his death in 1971. These funds aided in paying for numerous trips in pursuit of her later life hobby.

She attended a tiny elementary school in Lake Zurich with only two other students. At age 11, she met her future husband, David Snetsinger (who was 13), at a 4-H club.

She studied at Swarthmore College, graduating with a degree in the German language. She taught afterwards at a nearby girls school. After her husband's military service in Korea, they both pursued master's degrees. Hers was in German literature.

== Birding career and melanoma diagnosis ==
Snetsinger was inspired to begin birding after seeing a Blackburnian warbler in 1961. Her first bird watching trip was in 1965 in Minnesota with a friend. She became locally known as a successful birder in the 1970s.

Snetsinger was spurred to find the most birds after her doctor diagnosed her with terminal melanoma in 1981, the year she turned 50 years old. Instead of convalescence at home or pursuing treatments, she took a trip to Alaska to watch birds, and returned home to find the cancer in remission. The cancer went into remission about five years at a time, then would recur. She sought surgical treatment for one recurrence. After that Alaska trip, Snetsinger travelled widely to identify birds and see new places in the world. She visited remote areas, sometimes under unstable political conditions, to add to her growing life list. As an amateur ornithologist, she took copious field notes, especially regarding distinctive subspecies, many of which have since been reclassified as full species.

When Snetsinger began observing birds, there were about 8,500 known species, compared to about 10,000 in the year of her death. In 1995 she submitted a list of 8,040 species she had documented to the American Birding Association (ABA) and to the Guinness Book of World Records. She was the first person to exceed 8,000 species observed, in 1995. By the time of her death, she had identified and documented 8,398 species, nearly 85% of the known species in the world. Her observations included 2,000 birds in monotypic genera, that is, the only species in the genus. Her detailed notes on the birds she saw were expected to lengthen her list, as some were likely to be identified as new species after her death.

Birding has meant a variety of things to many different people but for me it has been intricately intertwined with survival.

— Phoebe Snetsinger

Reviewing the biography of Snetsinger by Olivia Gentile, Frank Graham, Jr. compared her strong competitive spirit with that of Danica Patrick in auto racing and Judit Polgár of Hungary in chess, both women successful in male-dominated fields. Snetsinger travelled about four months each year, spending the rest of the year studying photos of birds, quite aware of the competition. Her mother saw this activity as that of "a bird afraid of being caged." She missed her mother's funeral and the wedding of one of her daughters while on trips to observe birds.

The long time of remission gave her a sense of invincibility, though she endured injuries, and in Papua New Guinea, she was gang-raped by five men with machetes. Yet she returned to Papua New Guinea the next year. Her treks took her to deserts, swamps, jungles and mountains on every continent several times over. Over her career, she survived malaria, a potentially deadly boat accident, and being taken hostage in Ethiopia. According to birder Nate Swick, birding in 2016 is much less effort than when Snetsinger did her work of observing birds in their habitat, as many nations have promoted ecotourism to strengthen their economy, and Snetsinger is seen by other birders as a pioneer. Tony Bennett, who knew her from birding in New Mexico, said she was the "consummate craftsman of bird-watching . . . intense, and knowledgable [sic]."

== Memoir ==
Snetsinger's memoir, entitled Birding on Borrowed Time, was published posthumously in 2003 by The American Birding Association (ABA). The publisher described it as: "More than merely a travel narrative, the book is also a profoundly moving human document, as it details how Phoebe Snetsinger's obsession with birds became a way of coping with terminal illness."

== Awards and honors ==
In 1994, the Guinness Book of Records named her "the world's leading bird-watcher".

In a 1995 interview, "Snetsinger says a serious birder who goes out with experienced companions once a week might accumulate 200 new species in a year as she once did. After a year like that, however, the pace slows down drastically, since you will have seen almost all the state's common species." She was acknowledged as the "current world record holder, with more than 8,000 bird species to her credit"

In 1999, the Guinness Book of Records said of Snetsinger: "TOP BIRD-WATCHERS Phoebe Snetsinger of Webster Groves, Missouri, has spotted 8,040 of the 9,700 known bird species since 1965".

In 2010, she was described as one of two people ever to see more than 8,000 species of birds.

To honor Snetsinger on her 85th birthday, on June 9, 2016, a commemorative Google Doodle was posted.

== Death ==
On November 23, 1999, while on a birding trip in Madagascar, the van in which Snetsinger was riding overturned, killing her instantly. The final bird she observed before the accident was the red-shouldered vanga, a species which had been described as new to science only two years before, in 1997.

== Personal life ==
Phoebe and David Snetsinger had four children, three of whom are bird researchers in the United States. At the time of Phoebe's death, Carol was involved in research on birds in Alaska and Montana; Susan was "a student of the spotted owl in the Northwest" of the U.S.; and Thomas was researching endangered species of birds for the federal government. Their third daughter, Penny, is a chemistry professor at Sacred Heart University in Fairfield, Connecticut.

At the time of her death, Snetsinger was a resident of Webster Groves, Missouri, a suburb of St. Louis.
