= Olivia Gentile =

American author (born 1974)

- Born: June 13, 1974 (age 52); Washington, D.C., U.S.
- Spouse: Andy Borowitz (m. 2008)
- Writing career
- Genre: Non-fiction
- Website: www.oliviagentile.com

Olivia Gentile is an American author. Her first book, Life List, was published in 2009 and tells the true story of Phoebe Snetsinger, a housewife and cancer survivor from St. Louis who saw more bird species than anyone else in history.

== Background and education ==
Gentile grew up in Washington, D.C., attending Sidwell Friends School, and graduated from Harvard in 1996. She earned an M.F.A. in nonfiction writing from Columbia in 2003.

She was a reporter for The Hartford Courant (1999–2001) and The Rutland Herald (1996–1999). Gentile supported herself while writing Life List by working as a part-time assistant to a federal judge in Brooklyn, the Hon. Raymond J. Dearie.

== Personal ==
In January 2008, Gentile married Andy Borowitz, the comedian and writer whose main outlet is the popular website The Borowitz Report. They live in Hanover, New Hampshire with their three children.

== Reviews of Life List ==
In a prepublication review, the scientist and author of Guns, Germs, and Steel, Jared Diamond, wrote of Life List,

Except for one thing, this book would rate as a great adventure novel and fictional psychological portrait, about a woman’s obsession with bird-watching, its effect on her relationships with her husband and her four children, and the horrifying mishaps that she survived on each continent—until the last mishap. But the book isn’t that great novel, because instead it’s a great true story: the biography of Phoebe Snetsinger, who set the world record for bird species seen, after growing up in an era when American women weren’t supposed to be competitive or have careers. Whether or not you pretend that it’s a novel, you’ll enjoy this powerful, moving story.

On April 15, 2009, Life List was favorably reviewed in The Christian Science Monitor: "That Snetsinger flew the coop was both a point of pride and a point of friction for her family, and Gentile does not cast judgment but simply describes what she sees. By documenting the tension between the obligation to others and the obligation to oneself, Gentile has written a book as much about the life of women as about a woman’s life.”
