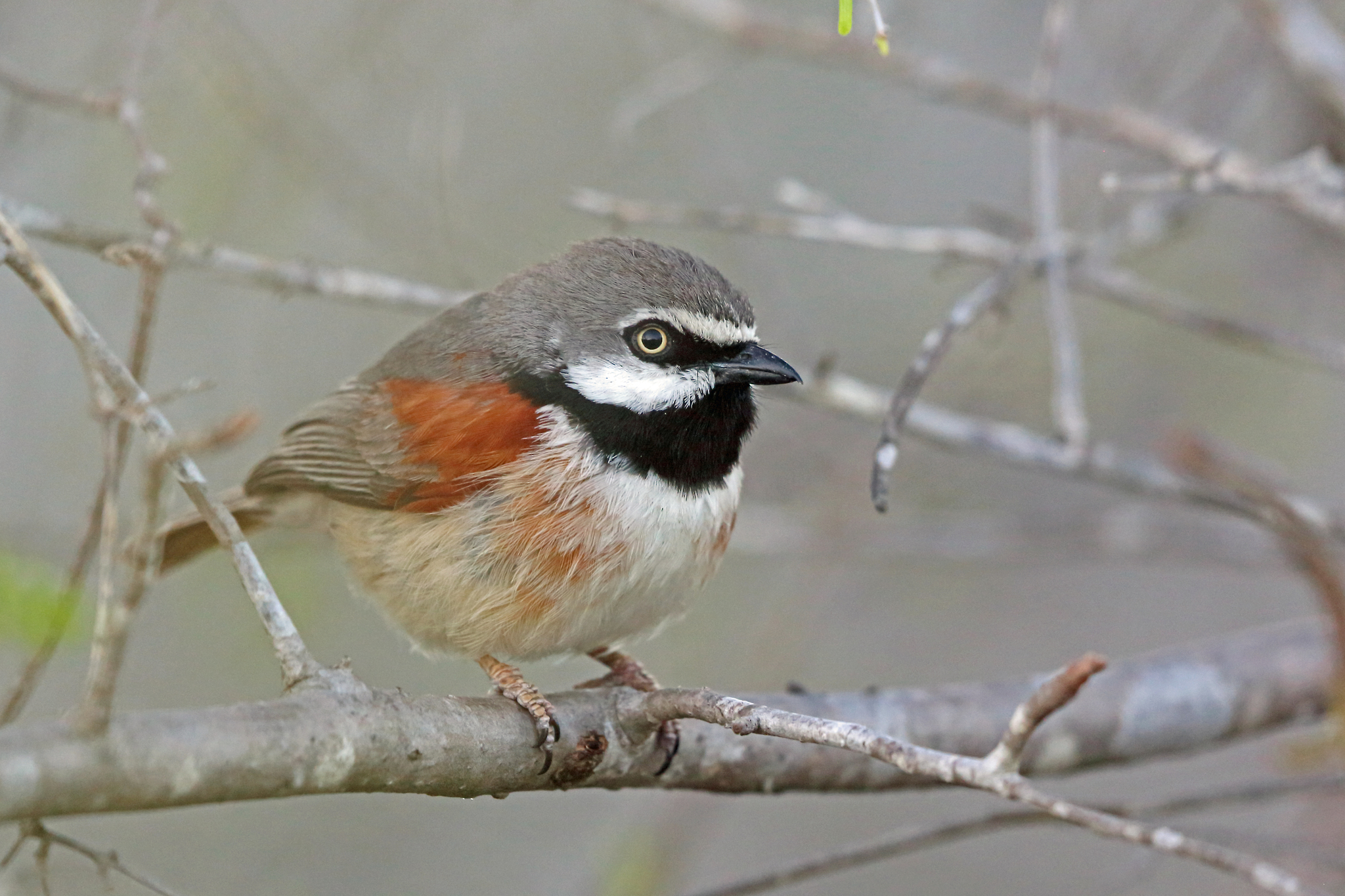
- Red-shouldered Vanga in Madagascar

Conservation status
- Vulnerable (IUCN 3.1)

Scientific classification
- Kingdom: Animalia
- Phylum: Chordata
- Class: Aves
- Order: Passeriformes
- Family: Vangidae
- Genus: Calicalicus
- Species: C. rufocarpalis

Binomial name
- Calicalicus rufocarpalis Goodman, Hawkins & Domergue, 1997

= Red-shouldered vanga =

Species of bird

The red-shouldered vanga (Calicalicus rufocarpalis) is a member of the vanga family endemic to south-west Madagascar.

This species is notable for being the last species viewed by internationally renowned bird watcher Phoebe Snetsinger before her 1999 death in Madagascar.

== Description ==
Like many of the vangas, this species is sexually dimorphic; the male is the more colorful of the two. He has a pale gray crown, nape and mantle, with white on the ear coverts and forehead. Other than a black bib, which extends from the beak partway down the breast and up the sides of his neck, his underparts are principally whitish, tinged with pink on the breast and flanks. His flight feathers are brown, his wing coverts are brick-red, and his tail is a pale brick-red. His beak is black, his irides are yellow, and his legs and feet are pinkish-gray.

== Conservation and threats ==
The species has been rated as Vulnerable by the IUCN, based on its low population numbers and very small range.
