= Leo Burnett =

American advertising executive (1891–1971)

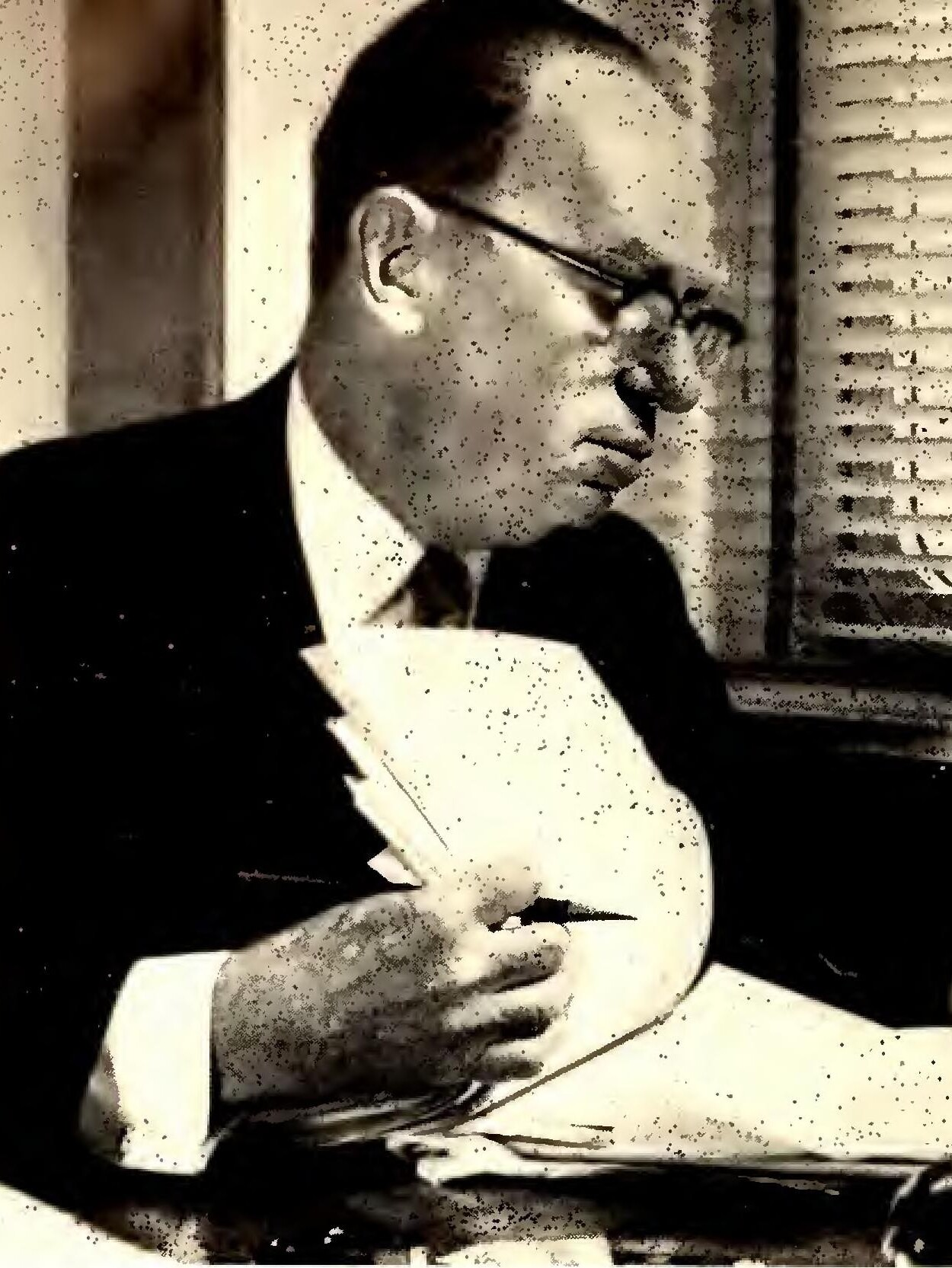
- Born: October 21, 1891; St. Johns, Michigan, U.S.
- Died: June 7, 1971 (aged 79); Hawthorn Woods, Illinois, U.S.
- Burial place: Rosehill Cemetery
- Other name: Burnett in 1959
- Education: University of Michigan (B.S., 1914)
- Occupation: Advertising executive
- Known for: Founder of Leo Burnett Worldwide
- Spouse: Naomi Geddes (m. 1918)
- Children: Peter Burnett; Joseph Burnett; Phoebe Snetsinger

Leo Burnett (October 21, 1891 – June 7, 1971) was an American advertising executive and the founder of Leo Burnett Company, Inc. He was responsible for creating some of advertising's best-known characters and campaigns of the 20th century, including Tony the Tiger, the Marlboro Man, the Maytag Repairman, United's "Fly the Friendly Skies", and Allstate's "Good Hands", and for garnering relationships with multinational clients such as McDonald's, Hallmark and Coca-Cola. In 1999, Burnett was named by Time as one of the 100 most influential people of the 20th century.

== Biography ==
Leo Burnett was born in St. Johns, Michigan, on October 21, 1891, to Noble and Rose Clark Burnett. Noble ran a dry goods store and as a young man, Burnett worked with his father, watching Noble as he designed ads for the business. After high school, Burnett went on to study journalism at the University of Michigan and received his bachelor's degree in 1914.

Burnett's first job after college was as a reporter for the Peoria Journal Star in Peoria, Illinois. In 1917, he moved to Detroit and was hired to edit an in-house publication for Cadillac Motor Car Company, Cadillac Clearing House, later becoming an advertising director for that institution. At Cadillac, Burnett met his advertising mentor, Theodore F. MacManus, whom Burnett called "one of the great advertising men of all time". MacManus ran the agency that handled Cadillac's advertising.

In 1918, Burnett married Naomi Geddes. The couple met at a restaurant near the Cadillac offices, where Naomi was a cashier. They went on to have three children: Peter, Joseph and Phoebe.

During World War I, Burnett joined the United States Navy for six months. His service was mostly at Great Lakes building a breakwater. After completing his service, Burnett returned to Cadillac. A few employees at Cadillac formed the LaFayette Motors Company – triggering Burnett to move to Indianapolis to work for the new firm. Soon he was offered a position with Homer McKee. He then left LaFayette and joined McKee, where Burnett said of the founder, "(He) gave me my first feel of what I have come to regard as the "warm sell" as contrasted to the "hard sell" and "soft sell". This was his first agency job.

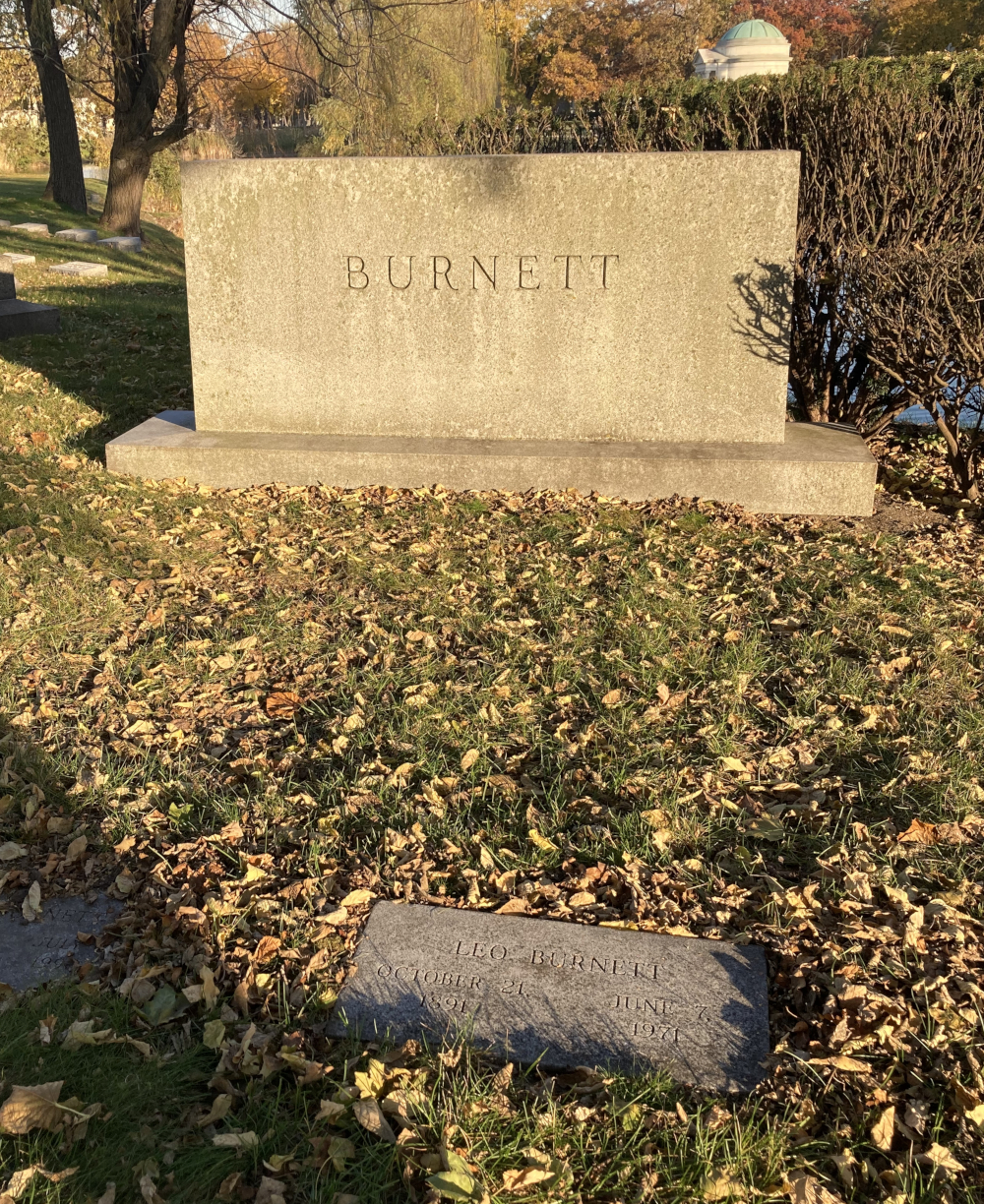
Burnett's grave at Rosehill Cemetery

After spending a decade at McKee's, and working through the stock market crash of 1929, Burnett left the company. In 1930, he moved to Chicago and was hired by Erwin, Wasey & Company, where he was employed for five years.

In 1935, Burnett founded the Leo Burnett Company, Inc. Later, the operation moved to the 18th floor of the London Guarantee Building. Today, the agency has 9,000+ employees in over 85 offices globally.

In December 1967, nearing the end of his career, Burnett delivered his "When To Take My Name Off The Door" speech at the agency's holiday gathering.

On June 7, 1971, Burnett went to his agency, pledging to colleagues to work three days per week due to health problems. That evening, at age 79, he died of a heart attack at his family farm in Hawthorn Woods, Illinois. He is buried at Rosehill Cemetery in Chicago.

== Leo Burnett Company ==
A private company formed in 1935 and officially running under the name of "Leo Burnett Company, Inc.", the agency started with working capital of $50,000, eight employees and three clients. Now a part of Publicis Groupe, Leo Burnett is one of the largest agency networks with 85 offices in 69 countries and 9,000+ employees.

For the first several years, Burnett billed about $1 million annually. By 1950, billings had increased to $22 million, and by 1954 the company was at $55 million annually. By the end of the 1950s, the Leo Burnett Company was billing $100 million annually.

== Companies Burnett worked with ==
- Allstate (1957)
- Commonwealth Edison (1954)
- First Brands (1961)
- General Motors Oldsmobile (1967)
- Green Giant (1935)
- Heinz Pet Products (1958)
- Keebler Co. (1968)
- Kellogg's (1949)
- Kraft Foods (1984)
- Mattel (1970)
- Maytag (1955)
- Memorex (1968)
- Nestlé (1967)
- Philip Morris Co. (1954)
- Pillsbury (1944)
- Procter & Gamble (1952)
- Schlitz Brewing Company (1961)
- Starkist (1958)
- United Airlines (1965)

== Notable creations ==
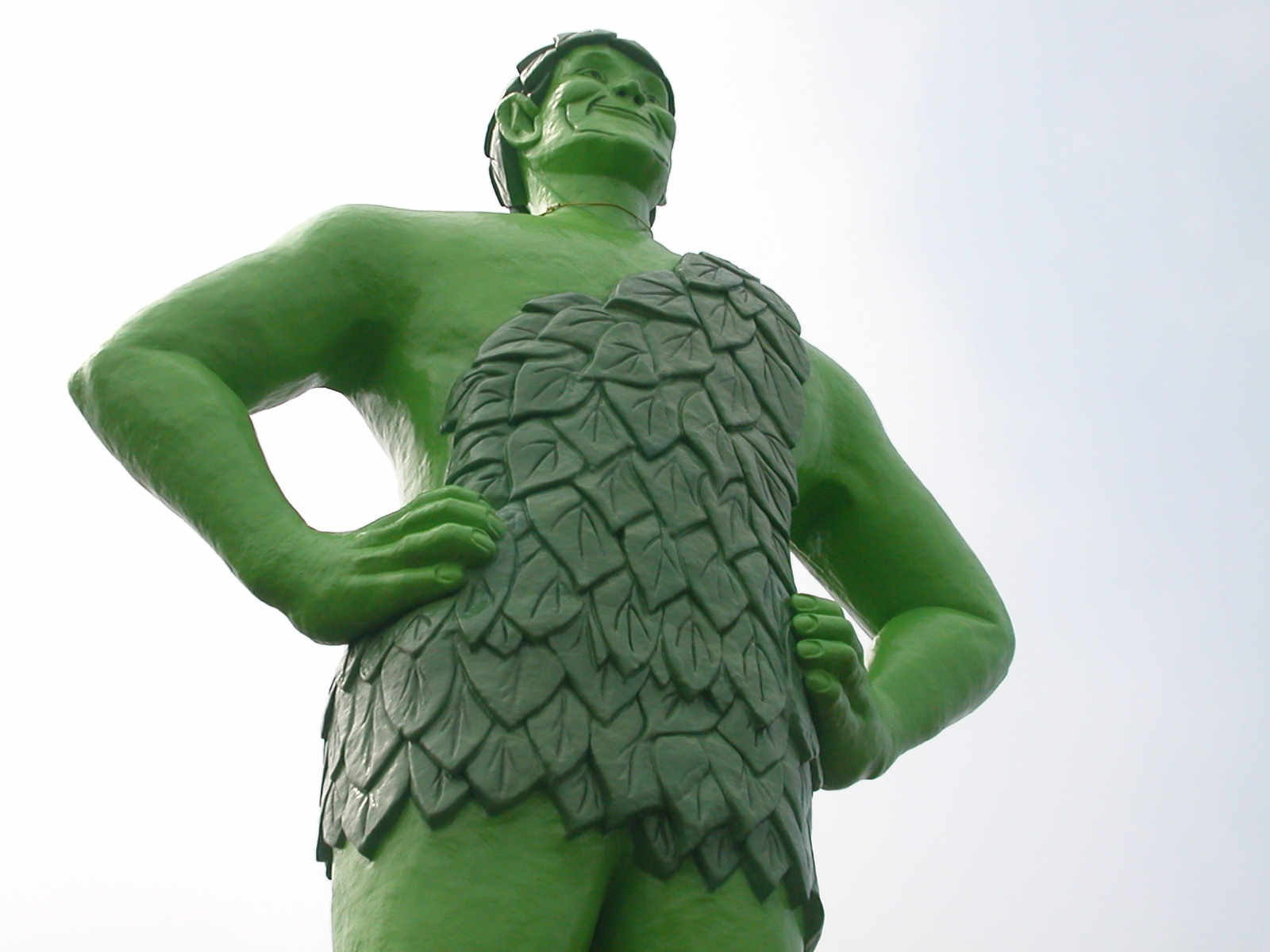
Jolly Green Giant – one of Burnett's creations

- Cornelius Rooster [Kellogg's Corn Flakes]
- Hubert The Lion [Harris Bank]
- Jolly Green Giant [Green Giant]
- Keebler Elves [Keebler]
- The Marlboro Man [Phillip Morris Co.]
- Maytag Repairman [Maytag]
- Morris the Cat [9 Lives]
- Pillsbury Doughboy [Pillsbury]
- Tony the Tiger [Kellogg's Frosted Flakes]
- Toucan Sam [Kellogg's Froot Loops]

== Advertising techniques ==
Burnett used dramatic realism in his advertising, the soft sell approach to build brand equity. Burnett believed in finding the "inherent drama" of products and presenting it in advertising through "warmth, shared emotions and experiences". His advertising drew from heartland-rooted values using simple, strong and instinctive imagery that talked to people. He was also known for using "cultural archetypes" in his copy, by creating mythical creatures that represented American values. The Jolly Green Giant, Pillsbury Doughboy, Tony the Tiger and the Marlboro Man are all examples of this technique. The aforementioned examples also demonstrate Burnett's tendency to leverage the concept of masculinity in his campaigns.

=== Corny language ===
Burnett was known for keeping a folder in the lower left-hand corner of his desk called "Corny Language". He collected words, phrases, and analogies that struck him as being particularly apt in expressing an idea.

== Social advertising ==
In 1947, Burnett wrote The Good Citizen, a booklet concerning the duties and privileges of being a U.S. citizen. This was done as a public service for The Advertising Council and The American Heritage Foundation.

== See also ==
- History of advertising
