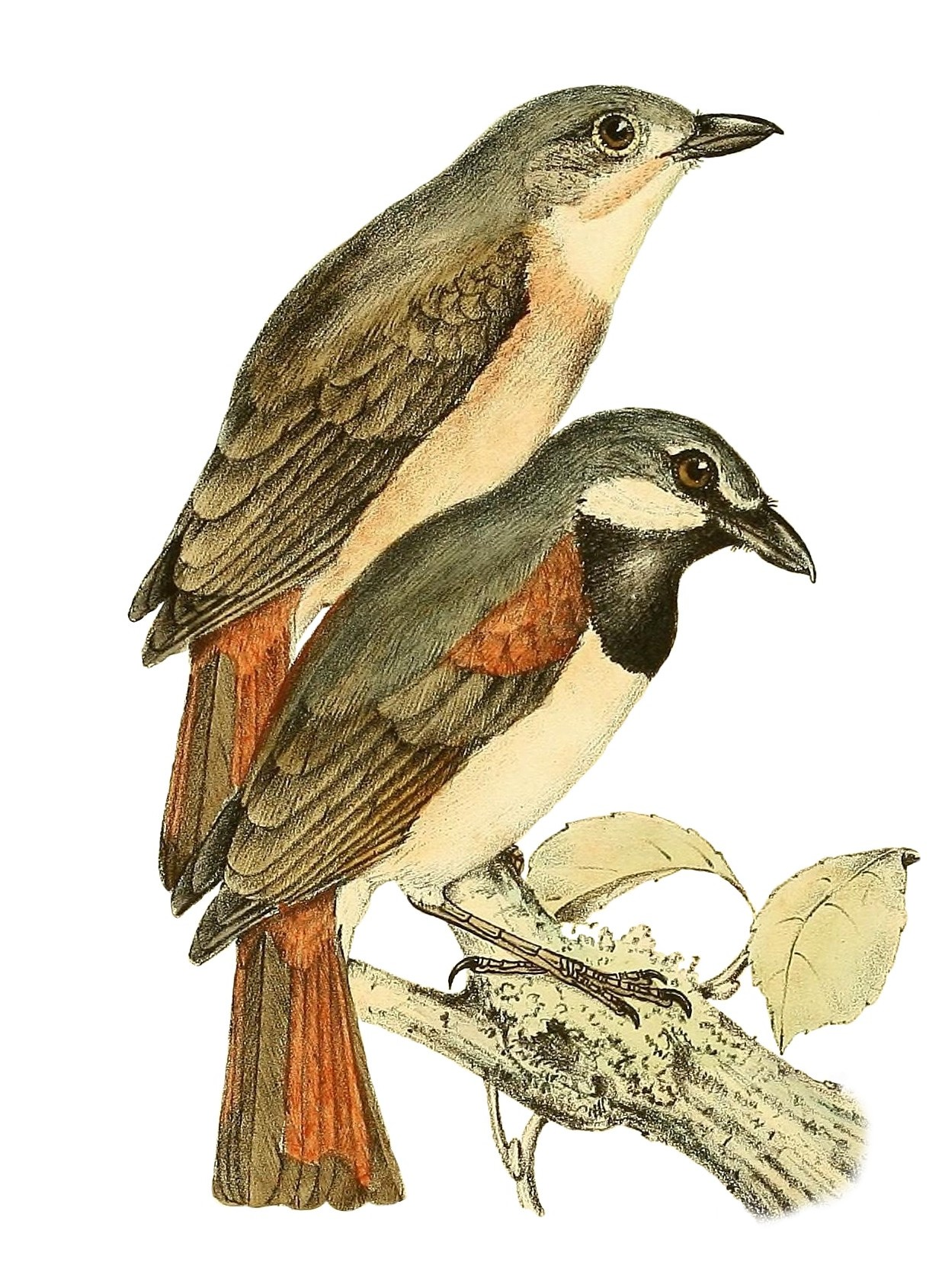
- Red-tailed vanga (Calicalicus madagascariensis)

Scientific classification
- Kingdom: Animalia
- Phylum: Chordata
- Class: Aves
- Order: Passeriformes
- Family: Vangidae
- Genus: Calicalicus; Bonaparte, 1854

Type species
- Lanius madagascariensis Linnaeus, 1766

Species
- C. madagascariensis C. rufocarpalis

= Calicalicus =

Genus of birds

Calicalicus is a genus of bird in the family Vangidae. It contains two species, both of which are endemic to Madagascar:

== Species ==
Image	Scientific name	Common name	Distribution
	Calicalicus madagascariensis	Red-tailed vanga	Madagascar.
	Calicalicus rufocarpalis	Red-shouldered vanga	south-west Madagascar

The genus was introduced by the French naturalist Charles Lucien Bonaparte in 1854 with the red-tailed vanga as the type species. The name Calicalicus is from the Malagasy word Cali-cali reported by the French zoologist Mathurin Jacques Brisson for the male red-tailed vanga.
