= Will Smith (The Fresh Prince of Bel-Air) =

Fictionalized version of Will Smith in The Fresh Prince of Bel-Air

- The Fresh Prince of Bel-Air/Bel-Air character
- Will Smith (left) and Jabari Banks (right) as Will Smith.
- First appearance: "The Fresh Prince Project" (The Fresh Prince of Bel-Air; 1990) "Dreams and Nightmares" (Bel-Air; 2022)
- Created by: Andy Borowitz; Susan Borowitz
- Portrayed by: Will Smith (The Fresh Prince of Bel-Air); Jerry Madison (Bel-Air film); Jabari Banks (Bel-Air TV series)

In-universe information
- Nicknames: Master William, Prince, Fresh Prince, Will
- Family: Lou Smith (father); Vy Smith-Wilkes (mother); Fred Wilkes (stepfather); Lisa Wilkes (former fiance/stepsister)
- Relatives: Eli Smith (grandfather); Helen Lewis (aunt); Janice Schaeffer (aunt); Philip Banks (uncle); Vivian Banks (aunt); Hilary Banks (cousin); Carlton Banks (cousin); Ashley Banks (cousin); Nicky Banks (cousin); Bobby Lewis (cousin); Frank Schaeffer Jr. (cousin); Reuben (great-uncle); Eleanor (great-aunt)

William Smith, a fictionalized version of actor and rapper Will Smith, is the main character of the 1990–1996 NBC television sitcom The Fresh Prince of Bel-Air and the 2022 Peacock television drama Bel-Air. The character was played by Smith himself in the original series and by Jabari Banks in the remake.

== Concept and characteristics ==
The character of Will Smith is loosely based on Smith's life and of Warner Bros. executive Benny Medina. In the show, "Will" is short for William, not Willard.

The show's premise, outlined in the opening theme, is that Will is a street-smart and laid-back West Philadelphia teenager who gets in a fight with gang members and is sent by his mother to live with his wealthy aunt and uncle in Bel-Air, an affluent neighborhood of Los Angeles.

An outsider and far from home, Will hangs a picture of Malcolm X on his wall. He often disagrees with his cousin Carlton, whom he sees as not quite "black" enough because he doesn't talk like other young African Americans. At the same time, he is also fiercely protective of Carlton, and will not hesitate to come to his cousin's defense. Similarly, Will often teases his uncle Phil, but values him as a father figure and fiercely defends him to outsiders.

== Reception ==
The character and Will Smith's portrayal received widespread praise from television critics and audiences. "Rarely has there been a television series so perfectly tailor-made for its star than The Fresh Prince of Bel-Air," wrote UGO editor Bryan Enk. "Fresh Prince fit Will Smith like a glove; it was obviously a showcase for him, but his co-stars were just as good, and Smith never hogged the spotlight (or the camera), allowing each cast member to shine in every episode."
