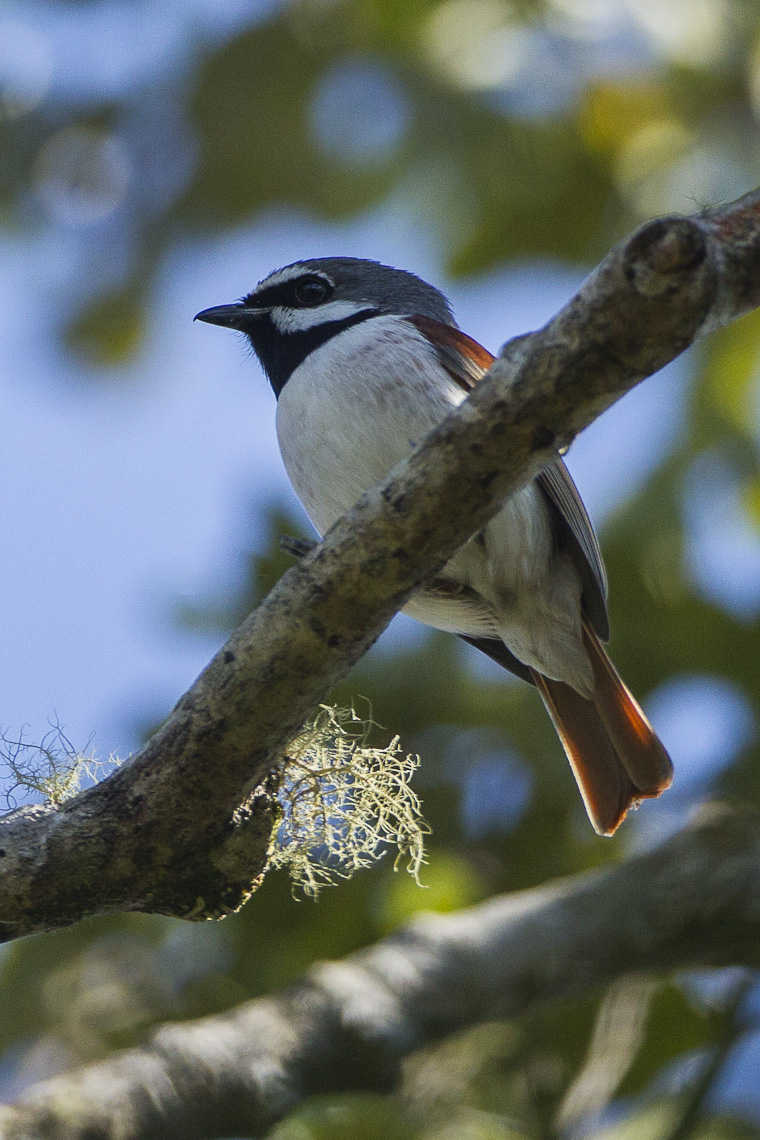

Conservation status
- Least Concern (IUCN 3.1)

Scientific classification
- Kingdom: Animalia
- Phylum: Chordata
- Class: Aves
- Order: Passeriformes
- Family: Vangidae
- Genus: Calicalicus
- Species: C. madagascariensis

Binomial name
- Calicalicus madagascariensis (Linnaeus, 1766)

Synonyms
- Lanius madagascariensis Linnaeus, 1766

= Red-tailed vanga =

Species of bird

The red-tailed vanga (Calicalicus madagascariensis) is a species of bird in the family Vangidae. It is endemic to Madagascar.

Its natural habitats are subtropical or tropical dry forests and subtropical or tropical moist lowland forests.

In 1760 the French zoologist Mathurin Jacques Brisson included a description of the red-tailed vanga in his Ornithologie based on a specimen collected in Madagascar. He used the French name La petite pie-griesche de Madagascar and the Latin Lanius Madagascariensis minor. Although Brisson coined Latin names, these do not conform to the binomial system and are not recognised by the International Commission on Zoological Nomenclature. When in 1766 the Swedish naturalist Carl Linnaeus updated his Systema Naturae for the twelfth edition, he added 240 species that had been previously described by Brisson. One of these was the red-tailed vanga. Linnaeus included a brief description, coined the binomial name Lanius madagascariensis and cited Brisson's work. The species is now placed in the genus Calicalicus that was introduced by the French naturalist Charles Lucien Bonaparte in 1854. The species is monotypic.
