= Andy Borowitz =

American writer, comedian, satirist and actor (born 1958)

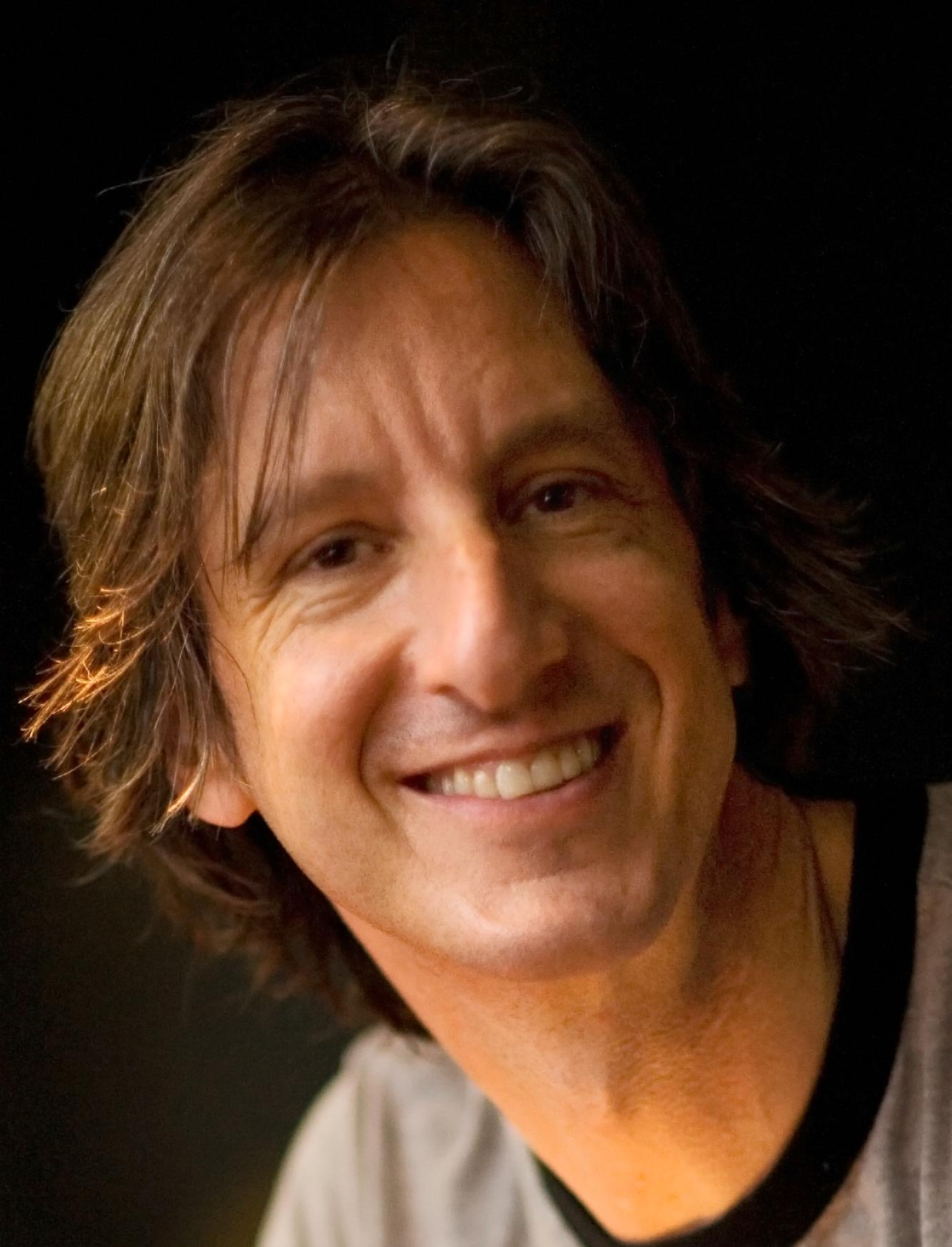
- Borowitz in New York City in 2007
- Born: January 4, 1958 (age 68); Shaker Heights, Ohio, U.S.
- Education: Harvard College
- Occupations: Comedian, satirist
- Known for: The Borowitz Report, The Fresh Prince of Bel-Air
- Spouses: Susan Stevenson (m. 1982; div. 2002) Olivia Gentile (m. 2008)
- Website: www.borowitzreport.com

Andy Borowitz (born January 4, 1958) is an American writer, comedian, satirist, and actor. Borowitz is a New York Times-bestselling author who won the first National Press Club award for humor. He is known for creating the NBC sitcom The Fresh Prince of Bel-Air and the satirical column The Borowitz Report.

== Early life ==
Borowitz was born to a marginally observant Reform Jewish family in Shaker Heights, Ohio, and graduated from Shaker Heights High School.

In 1980, Borowitz graduated magna cum laude from Harvard College, where he lived in Adams House and was president of the Harvard Lampoon. He also wrote for the Hasty Pudding Theatricals. Borowitz studied with playwright William Alfred and wrote his undergraduate thesis on Restoration comedy.

== Career ==
=== Hollywood ===
After graduating from Harvard, Borowitz moved to Los Angeles to work for producer Bud Yorkin at Tandem Productions, the company Yorkin co-founded with producer Norman Lear. From 1982 through 1983, he wrote for the television series Square Pegs, starring Sarah Jessica Parker. From 1983 through 1984, he wrote for the television series The Facts of Life. He wrote for various television series through the 1980s.

During his marriage to writer and producer Susan Borowitz (1982–2005), the two co-created The Fresh Prince of Bel-Air, which ran for six seasons on NBC and launched the acting career of Will Smith. The series won NAACP's Image Award for Outstanding Comedy Series in 1993.

In 1998, Borowitz co-produced the film Pleasantville, starring Reese Witherspoon, Tobey Maguire, William H. Macy, Joan Allen, and Jeff Daniels. It was nominated for three Academy Awards, including Best Art Direction-Set Decoration, Best Costume Design, and Best Music, Original Dramatic Score.

In 2004 Borowitz appeared in Woody Allen's Melinda and Melinda, starring Will Ferrell, and in Marie and Bruce, starring Julianne Moore and Matthew Broderick. Marie and Bruce was co-written by Wallace Shawn and director Tom Cairns. In 2007 he appeared in the film Fired!

=== Political satire ===
In the late 1990s, Borowitz began e-mailing humorous news parodies to friends. In 2001, he founded The Borowitz Report, a site that posts one 250-word news satire every weekday. The site led to greater fame and widespread attention for Borowitz as a political satirist. The Wall Street Journal devoted a page-one story to him and his site in 2003 and readership ultimately grew to the millions. In 2005, the newspaper syndicator Creators Syndicate began syndicating The Borowitz Report to dozens of major newspapers, including the Los Angeles Times, The Seattle Times, and The Philadelphia Inquirer. It is also one of the longest-running features at the Newsweek website. He has served as a commentator on the National Public Radio programs Weekend Edition Sunday and Wait Wait… Don't Tell Me!, the latter on November 12, 2006. Borowitz is also a regular contributor to humor newspaper Funny Times.

In 2007, he started blogging for the Huffington Post. His posts were featured on the home page of the blog and quickly became one of its most popular features. His popularity surged during the 2008 campaign, leading The Daily Beast to call him "America's satire king".

In 2009, The Borowitz Report began a Twitter feed, which was voted the number-one Twitter account in the world in a Time magazine poll in 2011. Eventually, he abandoned the feed.

On July 18, 2012, Borowitz announced that The New Yorker had acquired The Borowitz Report website, the first time that the magazine had ever made such an acquisition. In its first 24 hours as a New Yorker feature, The Borowitz Report garnered the most page views on the entire New Yorker website.

=== Television performer ===
In 2002, Borowitz joined the staff of CNN's American Morning and soon appeared on the program three mornings a week. In 2004, he covered the Democratic National Convention for the channel, paired with comedian Lewis Black of The Daily Show. He has made numerous appearances on other television programs including Countdown with Keith Olbermann, Best Week Ever on VH1 and Live at Gotham on Comedy Central.

In 2010, Borowitz appeared on the PBS show Need to Know. Tom Shales, television critic for The Washington Post, singled out Borowitz for praise, calling him "one of the wittiest Web wags".

=== Stand-up comedy ===
Borowitz's success as a television performer led to his becoming a strong draw as a stand-up comedian, and he started headlining at major comedy clubs across the country, including Carolines on Broadway, where he hosts a monthly show called Next Week's News. Other major comedians who have appeared with him in that show include Amy Sedaris and Susie Essman.

For four consecutive years starting in 2004, he performed at The Comedy Festival in Aspen, Colorado.

In September 2007, he headlined an edition of Next Week's News at the Bumbershoot festival in Seattle, Washington, performing to standing-room-only audiences and critical acclaim in the press, including the Seattle Post-Intelligencer. He also performed to a sold-out house at the 2007 New York Comedy Festival, which featured other prominent comedians including Denis Leary, Bill Maher, and Sarah Silverman.

In 2008, he hosted a series of sold-out shows at New York City's 92nd Street Y called "Countdown to the Election". The show earned rave reviews and featured such guests as Arianna Huffington, Mo Rocca, Jonathan Alter, Joy Behar, and Jeffrey Toobin.

He continued to tour the country performing stand-up, including a performance at the University of California, Santa Barbara in April 2008. The university newspaper, Daily Nexus, reported that Borowitz played to a packed house and had the audience "erupting with laughter".

Comedian Mike Birbiglia praised Borowitz in a May 2009 profile in Harvard Magazine: "Andy just picked up stand-up comedy as a hobby, and he's as good at it as anybody."

On November 28, 2010, CBS News Sunday Morning aired a retrospective of his career as a comedian and writer, calling him "one of the funniest people in America".

On June 28, 2011, he performed at New York City's Central Park Summerstage and drew a crowd estimated at 5,000, setting a new record for turnout at a Summerstage spoken-word event.

=== The New Yorker ===
In 1998, Borowitz began contributing humor to The New Yorker magazine. He quickly became one of the magazine's most prolific humor contributors, writing dozens of essays including "Emily Dickinson, Jerk of Amherst", selected as one of the funniest humor pieces in the magazine's history and included in The New Yorker's humor collection Fierce Pajamas. Two more humor pieces of his appeared in the magazine's 2008 collection Disquiet, Please! He has also performed at The New Yorker Festival's humor revues at The Town Hall in New York City with such other New Yorker contributors as Woody Allen, Steve Martin, and Calvin Trillin. Additionally, he has joined The New Yorker College Tour, where he has performed with improv group The Second City and David Sedaris.

In addition to writing for The New Yorker, Borowitz has written for many other magazines, including Vanity Fair and The Believer, and was a primary contributor to the cult magazine Army Man.

=== National Book Awards ===
In 2009, Borowitz was chosen by the National Book Foundation to host the National Book Awards in New York City. Previous hosts have included such comedians and writers as Steve Martin and Garrison Keillor. His performance earned him a return engagement for the 2010 awards ceremony.

=== The 50 Funniest American Writers ===
In 2011, Library of America chose Borowitz to edit an anthology of American humor, The 50 Funniest American Writers. Encompassing American humor from Mark Twain to The Onion, the book was set to be released on October 13, 2011. It became a best seller on the day of its publication, reaching number eight on Amazon.com and becoming the number-one humor book in the United States. It also became the first book in the 32-year history of the Library of America to become a New York Times and Wall Street Journal bestseller. Both Barnes & Noble and Amazon.com named it a Best Book of 2011, and Amazon.com named it the number-one Entertainment Book of the Year. In a feature about the book, The Washington Post noted its popular success, calling Borowitz "America's finest fake-news creator and sharpest political satirist".

=== An Unexpected Twist ===
In 2012, Borowitz wrote his first autobiographical work, An Unexpected Twist, an Amazon Kindle single. The essay recounts Borowitz's near-death experience in 2008 while undergoing emergency abdominal surgery in New York City. A mixture of dark comedy, hospital drama and love story, the book became a bestseller on its first day of release, placing number one on Amazon's Kindle Single chart. It became the first nonfiction Kindle Single to make The Wall Street Journal bestseller list, debuting at number six.

In his book review for The New York Times, Dwight Garner wrote, "Andy Borowitz is the funniest human on Twitter, and that's not mean praise. His first original e-book—the current best-selling Single—is a seriocomic memoir called An Unexpected Twist, about a blockage in his colon that nearly killed him. This funny book has a sneaky emotional gravity. As the time of his illness, he'd been married only a few months, and his small book becomes a rather large love story."

In his review of the book, journalist Seth Mnookin wrote, "Borowitz has become one of the most lauded satirists in the country—think of him as a literary Jon Stewart. His name graces the cover of one of the most successful Library of America volumes ever (The 50 Funniest American Writers* (*According to Andy Borowitz)). He was voted by Time magazine readers as having the #1 Twitter feed in the world. He even hosted the National Book Awards—twice… It's no surprise that Borowitz is able to mine his situation for humor. What makes An Unexpected Twist even more satisfying is his ability to highlight some of the surreal and infuriating aspects of modern American medical care without hitting the reader over the head with them."

On June 25, 2012, Amazon named An Unexpected Twist the Best Kindle Single of 2012.

=== Other ===
Since 1999, Borowitz has been the primary host of The Moth, a New York-based storytelling group. He sings with the literary rock band Rock Bottom Remainders, a group with a rotating cast of players including Dave Barry, Matt Groening, Roy Blount Jr., Stephen King, Amy Tan, Robert Fulghum, Barbara Kingsolver, and Scott Turow. He has taught screenwriting in the United States and Europe and is on the guest faculty of the Maurits Binger Film Institute in Amsterdam.

In October 2012, he became the host of the BBC comedy series News Quiz USA. The hit comedy series has millions of listeners on BBC Radio 4 in the U.K. and is broadcast on the public radio station WNYC in New York.

== Personal life ==
He was married to Susan Borowitz, the co-creator of The Fresh Prince of Bel-Air. After their divorce he married Olivia Gentile, the author of Life List: A Woman's Quest for the World's Most Amazing Birds. He has three children and lives in Hanover, New Hampshire.

== Awards ==
- 1992 – NAACP Image Award for The Fresh Prince of Bel-Air
- 2001 and 2005 – finalist for the Thurber Prize for American Humor
- 2002 – inducted into the New York Friars' Club
- 2004 – inaugural National Press Club Award for Humor

== Books ==
- 2000 – The Trillionaire Next Door – The Greedy Investor's Guide to Day Trading. New York: HarperBusiness. ISBN 978-0-06-662076-3.
- 2003 – Who Moved My Soap? – The CEO's Guide to Surviving in Prison. New York: Simon & Schuster. ISBN 978-0-7432-5142-6.
- 2004 – Governor Arnold – A Photodiary of His First 100 Days in Office. New York: Simon & Schuster. ISBN 978-0-7432-6266-8.
- 2004 – The Borowitz Report – The Big Book of Shockers. New York: Simon & Schuster Paperbacks. ISBN 978-0-7432-6277-4.
- 2006 – The Republican Playbook. New York: Hyperion Books. ISBN 978-1-4013-0290-0.
- 2009 – Who Moved My Soap? – The CEO's Guide to Surviving in Prison – The Bernie Madoff Edition. New York City, New York: Simon & Schuster. ISBN 978-0-7432-5142-6.
- 2011 – The 50 Funniest American Writers* (*According to Andy Borowitz) – An Anthology of Humor from Mark Twain to The Onion. New York City, New York: Library of America. ISBN 978-1-59853-107-7.
- 2012 – An Unexpected Twist. Seattle, Washington: Amazon Digital Services. ASIN B007A4V33M (Amazon Kindle Single).
- 2022 – Profiles in Ignorance – How America's Politicians Got Dumb and Dumber. New York: Simon & Schuster. ISBN 978-1-66800-388-6.
