= Hail to the Hills of Westwood =

"Hail to the Hills of Westwood" is the school song or alma mater of the University of California, Los Angeles. It was written by Jeane Margaret Emerson, a 1929 graduate of UCLA, and adopted by the school in 1960. The current arrangement performed by the UCLA Marching Band was written by band member Dwayne S. Milburn for the 1985 football season.

Until 1925, UCLA shared the University of California alma mater, "Hail to California!" "Hail Blue and Gold", written by a UCLA student in 1925, preceded "Hail to the Hills of Westwood", and was the school song until 1960.

== Other UCLA school songs ==
- "Mighty Bruins" - UCLA touchdown song written by Bill Conti in 1984
- "Rover" - UCLA victory song
- "Sons of Westwood"
- "Strike Up The Band (song)" - UCLA official song
- "The Bruin Warriors" - a version of "Big C" created in 2014
