= I'm Looking over a Four Leaf Clover =

1927 song by Harry M. Woods and Mort Dixon

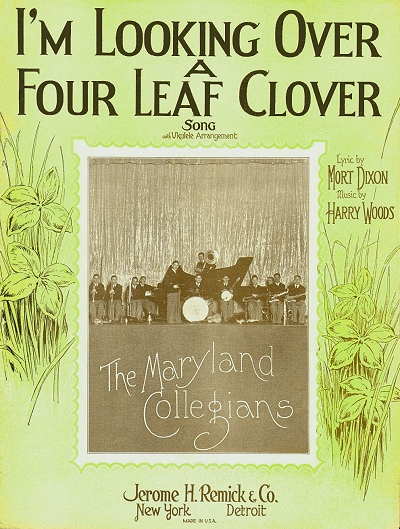
- Sheet music cover, 1927

Song by Nick Lucas
- Published: 1927
- Genre: Pop standard
- Composer: Harry M. Woods
- Lyricist: Mort Dixon

"I'm Looking over a Four Leaf Clover" is a song from 1927, which was written by Mort Dixon with music by Harry M. Woods. Original recordings were made during 1927 by Nick Lucas (No. 2), Ben Bernie (No. 3), and Jean Goldkette (No. 10).

== History ==
Written in 1927 by Mort Dixon (lyrics) and Harry M. Woods (music), the song became a success that same year with the release of recordings by Nick Lucas, Ben Bernie, and Jean Goldkette.

The song was then revived during 1948 by several artists, most notably Art Mooney, whose recording topped the charts for three weeks. Other charting 1948 versions were made by Russ Morgan (No. 6), Alvino Rey (No. 6), The Three Suns (No. 10), The Uptown String Band (No. 11), and Arthur Godfrey (No. 14).

During modern times the song is perhaps most associated with Merrie Melodies cartoons, as it was used in several of them. Additionally, the tune is commonly played by the string bands in Philadelphia's Mummers Parade. The Sons of Ben, the official supporters' group of Major League Soccer's Philadelphia Union, have adopted the song as one of their chants, singing at every home match at the 20 minute, ten second mark, symbolic as the founding year of the Union.

== Renditions ==
- The UCLA Band has played an arrangement of this tune since 1954, and uses the chorus as the second part of Rover, the Bruin victory song. Similar lyrics have been used for two other songs.
  - "My Dead Dog Rover" by Hank Stu Dave and Hank (Hank Landsberg & Dave Whited) from 1977, which is featured in the Dr. Demento 25th Anniversary Collection - The parody version "I'm Looking Over My Dead Dog Rover" was played on Dr. Demento's show for a time.
  - "I'm Lookin' Over My Dead Dog Rover" by Kevin Gershon from 1973 and played on KMET FM in Los Angeles.
- In 1948, Al "Jazzbo" Collins, a popular Salt Lake City disk jockey, is credited with popularizing Art Mooney's version of the song after he pulled a stunt playing the song repeatedly for hours on end. Some sources state 3 1/2 hours, other say it was 24 hours. For 120 minutes Mooney’s record played on while telephone calls were received from listeners who added insult to Collins’ injury by praising him "for playing something good for a change".
- Bugs Bunny sang this song in two different shorts. In Operation: Rabbit, he sang, "I'm lookin' over a three-leaf clover that I overlooked be-three". In Backwoods Bunny, as part of a running gag at the end of the short, he sings "I'm lookin' over a four (BANG!) leaf clover that I overlooked before... (BANG!) fore... (BANG!) fore... (BANG!) fore... (BANG!)" Tweety also briefly sang this song in the beginning of Home, Tweet Home while taking a bath.
- Wayne Newton released the song with "Dream Baby" as a single in early 1964. Whilst the A-Side, "Dream Baby", didn't chart, "I'm Looking over a Four Leaf Clover" bubbled under the Billboard Hot 100, peaking at No. 23.
- The New Jersey Lottery used this song in the 1970s through the early 1990s as the theme of the live drawings.
