= Rover (UCLA song) =

Traditional song

"Rover" is a song traditionally sung at the end of athletic contest victories by fans of the University of California, Los Angeles. It is a parody of the song "I'm Looking Over a Four Leaf Clover". The UCLA Band arrangement opens with "There'll Be a Hot Time in the Old Town Tonight". Following the opening, the band then plays the chorus to "I'm Looking Over a Four Leaf Clover". The band and students sing the lyrics, then the band plays the chorus again.

== History ==
The song "I'm Looking Over a Four Leaf Clover" was popularized in 1948 by Art Mooney. It was written in 1927 with words by Mort Dixon, and music by Harry M. Woods. "There'll Be a Hot Time in the Old Town Tonight" was written in 1886 with original lyrics by Joe Hayden and music by Theodore Metz, band leader of the McIntyre and Heath Minstrels. The UCLA Band arrangement is titled "Stanford Game (1954)", implying that it was originally played during the halftime of that football game by the UCLA Band.

The current song originated in the late 1960s, when a band student wrote the parody lyrics to the tune of "I'm Looking Over a Four Leaf Clover" during a football game. The UCLA song was retitled simply "Rover".

The song was initially played only after blowout basketball victories, which were frequent during John Wooden's time coaching the team. Now, "Rover" is played after all UCLA victories. The lyric "scattered all over the court" is changed to "scattered all over the field" when at a football or soccer match. Also, after the band sings the lyric "and in his head there's a great big dent" they jump off their seats or benches simultaneously and continue singing.

== Song notes ==
- During the annual game against traditional rival USC, the lyrics are changed slightly, changing the word "dog" to "horse", as a parody of the Trojans' horse mascot, Traveler.
- Following "And in his head, there's a great big dent", singers jump on the bleachers to make the "crashing" sound.
- During the run of NCAA basketball championships, the UCLA Band reserved an arrangement of the "Hallelujah Chorus" to be played only after a victory in the championship game.
- Other arrangements have been recorded including
  - "My Dead Dog Rover" by Hank Stu Dave and Hank (Hank Landsberg and Dave Whited) from 1977, which appears on the Dr. Demento 25th Anniversary Collection
  - "I’m Lookin’ Over My Dead Dog Rover" by Kevin Gershon from 1973 and played on KMET FM in Los Angeles

== See also ==
- "Mighty Bruins" - UCLA fight song from 1984
- "Hail to the Hills of Westwood" - UCLA alma mater
- "Strike Up The Band" - UCLA official song
- "Sons of Westwood"
