= Mighty Bruins =

Fight song for University of California Los Angeles

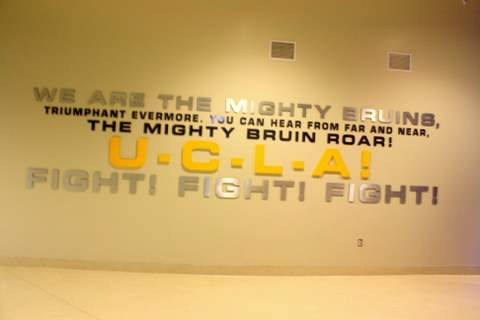
Lyrics to "Mighty Bruins" on display at Pauley Pavilion.

"Mighty Bruins" is a fight song of University of California, Los Angeles sports teams. Composed by Academy Award-winning composer Bill Conti (with lyrics from UCLA students Barbara Lamb and Don Holley), the song was commissioned by the UCLA Alumni Association on its fiftieth anniversary. It debuted in 1984 at the football game against Stanford University, with the school marching band conducted by Conti himself.

UCLA uses the song as its "victory march"; it is usually played whenever the team scores. As with UCLA's other fight song, Bruin Warriors, the Mighty Bruins prominently features the UCLA Eight Clap cheer.

== Other UCLA fight songs ==
One of the reasons for commissioning the song was to give UCLA its own fight song, separate from the University of California, Berkeley. UCLA has used Sons of Westwood, inspired by the Cal Big C tune, as its best known fight song since the All-California football weekends.

Another of the reasons for the commissioning was to replace some other lesser known UCLA fight songs such as "Sing U.C.L.A.", "By the Old Pacific's Rolling Waters", "Team, Hear our Song", and "Fight on Men of Westwood".

- "Fight on Men of Westwood", simply known as "Fight", uses the tune "Fight on, Pennsylvania!", a fight song of the University of Pennsylvania. It was written by David B. Zoob. Until the 1986 football season, "Fight" was played following a UCLA touchdown.
- "By the Old Pacific's Rolling Waters", or more simply "By", was written in 1948 specifically for UCLA by Thomas V. Beall.
- "Sing UCLA" was written by Irving Bibo and appears on a number of recorded college football song compilations.
- "Team, Hear Our Song", simply known as "Team" has words by Don Davis, music by Harry Fillmore.
- "Strike Up the Band for UCLA" was another leitmotif of the school teams from the time it was donated to the school by George and Ira Gershwin in 1936.
- Go On Bruins written by Milo Sweet and copyrighted in 1944. Milo also composed the USC fight song Fight On in 1922

Although the UCLA Band no longer performs "Fight on Men of Westwood", "Team, Hear Our Song", or "Sing UCLA" ("By The Old Pacific" is still heard occasionally, and is featured on the official band CDs), they are a part of the musical repertoire performed by the UCLA Alumni Band as part of their pre-game concert during every home game.

== Other UCLA school songs ==
- Hail to the Hills of Westwood - UCLA Alma Mater song
- Rover (song) - UCLA Victory song
- Strike Up The Band (song) - UCLA official song
- Bruin Warriors
