= Sons of Westwood =

Fight song of the UCLA

Bruin Warriors, also known as "Sons of Westwood" and "Big C", is a fight song of the University of California, Los Angeles (UCLA). The tune comes from Big C, a school fight song for the University of California, Berkeley. The UCLA Bruin Marching Band plays the song as part of their football pregame show as they move into the script UCLA formation. The song has been updated since 2016 with the new title "Bruin Warriors", and lyrics that include "daughters" as well as "sons".

== Lyrics ==
When sung, usually at the end of a game, the UCLA Band plays the song the first time, followed by the UCLA 8-clap. The first two lines are sung in 3/4 time. The singers wrap arms around their neighbors' shoulders and sway in time to the music, somewhat in the manner of a German Schunkeln. After the "Fight! Fight! Fight!", the song concludes in 4/4 time.

== History ==
=== "Big C" ===
"Big C" was composed in 1913 by Harold P. Williams, with lyrics by Norman Loyall McLaren. It was written to commemorate the construction of the large concrete "C" in 1905 on the "rugged Eastern foothills" of the Berkeley campus. The song was the winning entry in the Daily Californian school song competition in 1913.

=== Adoption by UCLA ===
From the late 1940s until the 1960s, UCLA and Cal alternatively hosted a college football doubleheader game as part of the "All University Weekend". The first game featured UC Davis vs. UCSB. In one of the last "All U Weekends", Kelly James, then associate director of the UCLA Marching Band and alumnus of the Cal Band, wrote an arrangement of "Big C" for a halftime show performed by the combined marching bands from UCLA, UC Davis, and Cal. Afterward, UCLA continued using James' arrangement of "Big C" as its fight song, adding their own lyrics and renaming it "Sons of Westwood". It was soon adopted as UCLA's fight song.

=== Controversy ===
Cal fans, most notably Cal band director James Berdahl, were enraged over James' theft of their song. A bitter exchange ensued between Berdahl and James for the next several years concerning the legal and ethical grounds for James' adaptation of the song. Finally, on February 18, 1969, UCLA lawyers were told by the Copyright Office of the Library of Congress that "Big C" had never been copyrighted, and therefore was in the public domain. However, whenever Cal plays UCLA and "Sons of Westwood" is played, Cal fans sing a parody ending, "but damn you, it's 'Big C.'" Likewise, whenever Cal plays "Big C", UCLA plays their signature "tag" at the end, which is a part of "Sons of Westwood" but not "Big C".

On the UCLA Band CD True Blue, in 2009, it was named "Big C [UCLA Fight Song]".

It was again renamed to Bruin Warriors and new lyrics were written, as the song did not reflect the demographic makeup of the band, which has included women since Title IX in 1972.

== See also ==
- "Mighty Bruins" - UCLA fight song from 1984, replaced a number of other songs used by the school
- "Hail to the Hills of Westwood" - UCLA alma mater
- "Rover (song)" - UCLA victory song
- "Strike Up the Band" - UCLA official song
