= UC Davis Aggies =

Sports teams of University of California, Davis

- University: University of California, Davis
- Nickname: Aggies
- NCAA: Division I (FCS)
- Conference: Mountain West (primary) Other conferences: List: Big Sky (football); Mountain Pacific Sports Federation (field hockey, STUNT); Big 12 (women's lacrosse); WCC (beach volleyball, men's water polo); Golden Coast Conference (women's water polo)
- Athletic director: Rocko DeLuca
- Location: Davis, California
- First year: 1915; 111 years ago
- Varsity teams: 25 (9 Men's and 16 Women's)
- Football stadium: UC Davis Health Stadium
- Basketball arena: University Credit Union Center
- Baseball stadium: Ann and James Dobbins Baseball Complex
- Softball stadium: La Rue Field
- Soccer stadium: Aggie Soccer Field
- Outdoor track and field venue: Toomey Field
- Other venues: Howard Field Beach Courts
- Colors: Yale blue and gold
- Mascot: Gunrock the Mustang
- Fight song: Aggie Fight, Sons of California, Big C (fight song)
- Website: ucdavisaggies.com
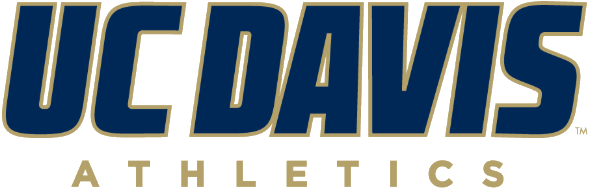

The UC Davis Aggies (also referred to as the Ags, Cal Aggies or Aggies) are the athletic teams that represent the University of California, Davis.

Eighteen of the school's 25 intercollegiate sports - baseball, men's basketball, men's cross country, men's golf, men's soccer, men's tennis, men's track & field, men's water polo, softball, women's basketball, women's beach volleyball, women's cross country, women's golf, women's soccer, women's tennis, women's track & field, women's volleyball and women's water polo - compete in the Mountain West Conference (MW).

The Aggies' football team compete in the Division I Football Championship Subdivision (FCS) (formerly known as Division I-AA), and are members of the Big Sky Conference, granting UC Davis the distinction of being one of only three UC campuses to field a football team (Cal and UCLA being the other two). It is also one of only four full members of Division I FBS (Note: Football Bowl Subdivision) conferences that do not play FBS football, and the only one of these that plays FCS football. The other three, Pac-12 Conference member Gonzaga, fellow MW member Grand Canyon, and American Conference member Wichita State, do not play football at all.

The Aggies are also members of the Mountain Pacific Sports Federation in women's field hockey, women's indoor track and field, women's gymnastics, and women's swimming and diving, the Eastern College Athletic Conference in equestrian, the West Coast Conference in beach volleyball and men's water polo, the Golden Coast Conference in women's water polo, and the Big 12 Conference in women's lacrosse.

On December 10, 2024 it was announced that UC Davis would join the Mountain West Conference in all sports except football, for which it will remain in the Big Sky Conference. This move is expected on July 1, 2026. In anticipation of joining the MW in 2026, UC Davis announced 'Aggie Ascent' on November 18th, 2025. The plan outlines a $265 million phased plan to upgrade, expand, and refit current and new UC Davis athletic facilities to comply with Mountain West (and potentially FBS) standards, the largest of which would be a $50 million dollar expansion to UC Davis Health Stadium.

== Nickname ==
The "Aggies" is UC Davis' official team nickname because of the university's agricultural origins. The university was previously called the College of Agriculture at Davis because it was part of UC Berkeley until it was separated in 1959 by the UC Regents.

== History ==
=== Origins (1915–1959) ===
Davis began its athletics program with football in 1915 as part of the University of California team.

=== Division II (1990–2003) ===
The Aggies finished first in NCAA Division II six times in 2003 and won the NACDA Director's Cup four years in a row from 1999 to 2003. In 1998, the UC Davis men's basketball team won the NCAA Division II Men's Basketball Championship, despite being one of the few non-scholarship institutions in Division II at that time.

UC Davis also won NCAA Division II championships in softball (2003), men's tennis (1992), and women's tennis (1990, 1993).

=== Division I (2004–present) ===
In November 2002, UC Davis students voted to elevate the athletics program to Division I, passing by 8 percent, with 4,638 voters approving a $183 annual fee increase earmarked for sports funding through 2008, defeating 3,929 voters against. However, the vote was merely advisory.

Following a year of heavy discussion by campus administrators, faculty, staff, students, alumni and the local community, taking a cue from the advisory vote, UCD chancellor Larry Vanderhoef officially announced the university's move to Division I on March 11, 2003.

The department then became a fully fledged D-I program on July 1, 2007.

== Sports sponsored ==
Men's sports	Women's sports
Baseball	Basketball
Basketball	Beach volleyball
Cross country	Cross country
Golf	Field hockey
Soccer	Golf
Tennis	Gymnastics
Track and field	Lacrosse
Water polo	Soccer
Football	Softball
	STUNT
	Swimming and diving
	Tennis
	Track and field^{1}
	Volleyball
	Water polo
^{1} – includes both indoor and outdoor

=== Baseball ===
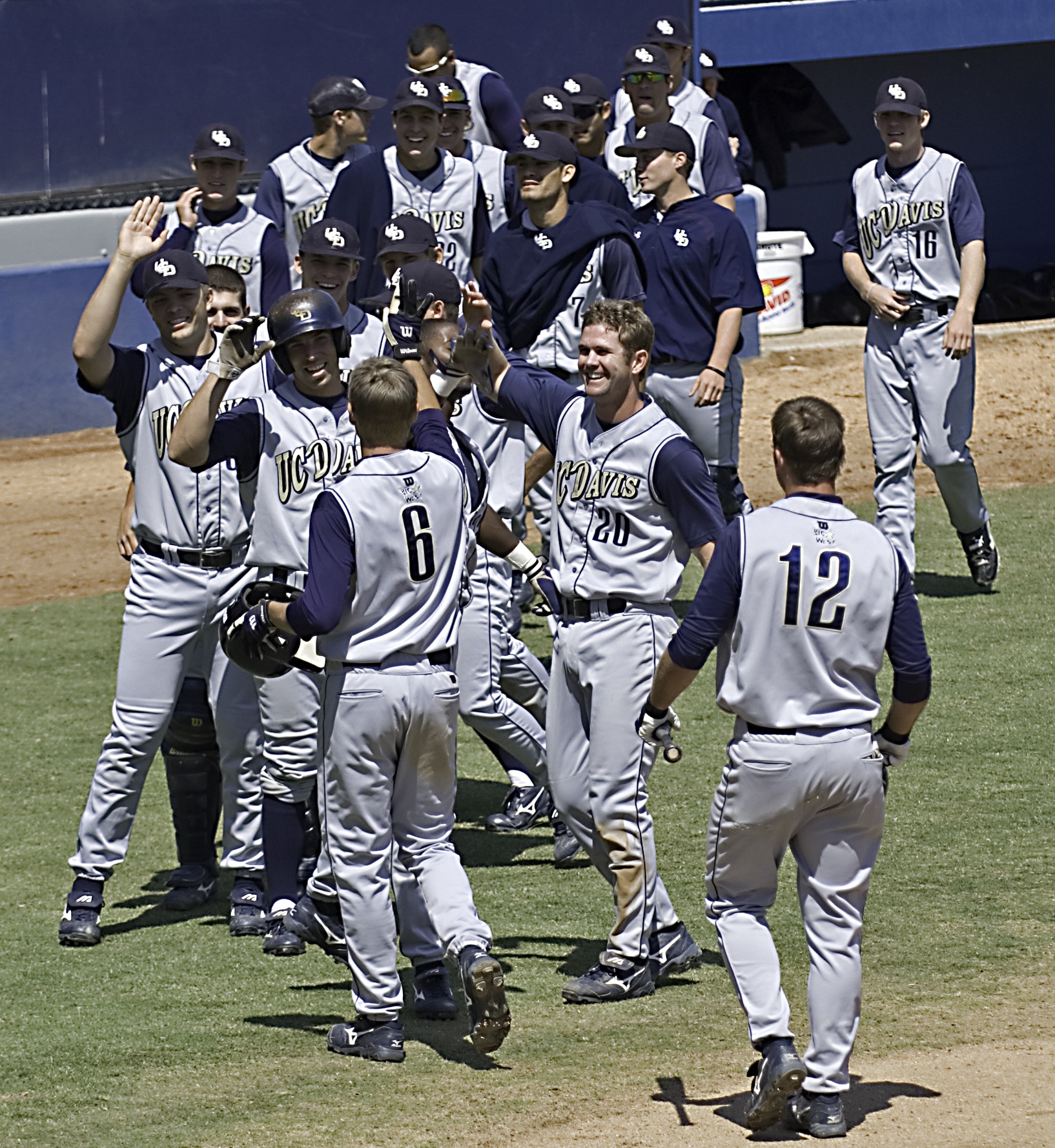
The Aggies baseball team celebrates a home run during a 2007 game

The UC Davis Aggies baseball team is the varsity intercollegiate athletic baseball team of the University of California, Davis. The team is a member of the Big West Conference, which is part of the NCAA Division I. The team plays its home games at Phil Swimley Field at the 3,500-seat Dobbins Stadium.

Former Stanford and Texas assistant coach Tommy Nicholson was hired as the 11th head coach in program history on December 11, 2021.

=== Basketball ===
==== Men's basketball ====
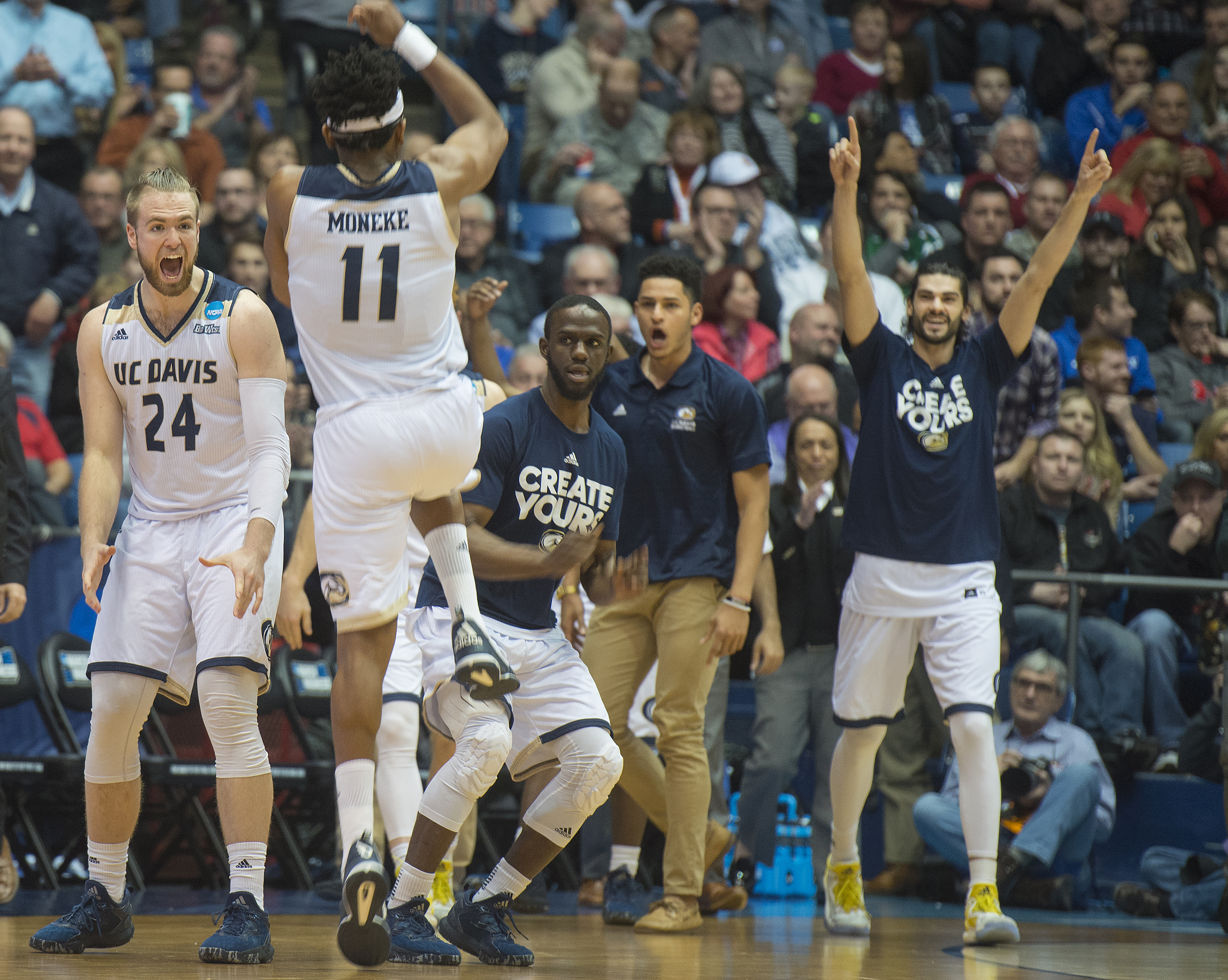
The Aggies celebrating vs North Carolina Central in 2017

The school's team currently competes in the Big West Conference, which is part of the NCAA Division I. UC Davis' first men's basketball team was fielded during the 1910–11 season. UC Davis won an NCAA Division II national championship in 1998 and had 12 postseason appearances. The team plays its home games at a 7,600-seat arena called University Credit Union Center.

The 2025–26 season is head coach Jim Les 15th with the program. During his tenure with the Aggies, the men's basketball team earned its inaugural Big West championship and first NCAA Division I men's basketball tournament appearance in 2017. Les, along with associate head coach Kevin Nosek and assistant coaches Jonathan Metzger-Jones and Kyle Vogt entered their seventh season together in 2025–26.

==== Women's basketball ====
Following a successful stint as an NCAA Division II program, the UC Davis women's basketball team began its transition to the NCAA Division I level in 2003–04, officially competing as a member of the Big West Conference in 2007–08.The team plays its home games at a 7,600-seat arena called University Credit Union Center.

The Aggies have won six Big West Conference regular season titles (2009–10, 2016–17, 2017–18, 2018–19, 2019–20, 2020–21) and three Big West Tournament titles (2011, 2019, 2021) in their combined 15 Division I seasons. UC Davis is one of three schools in league history to win at least four consecutive Big West regular season titles, joining UC Santa Barbara (1996–2005) and Long Beach State (1985–1989). The Aggies have advanced to the NCAA Tournament three times in 2011, 2019 and 2021 as the automatic qualifier from the Big West Conference and has earned five berths to the WNIT, including an "Elite Eight" appearance in 2018 and a "Sweet 16" appearance in 2017.

=== Football ===
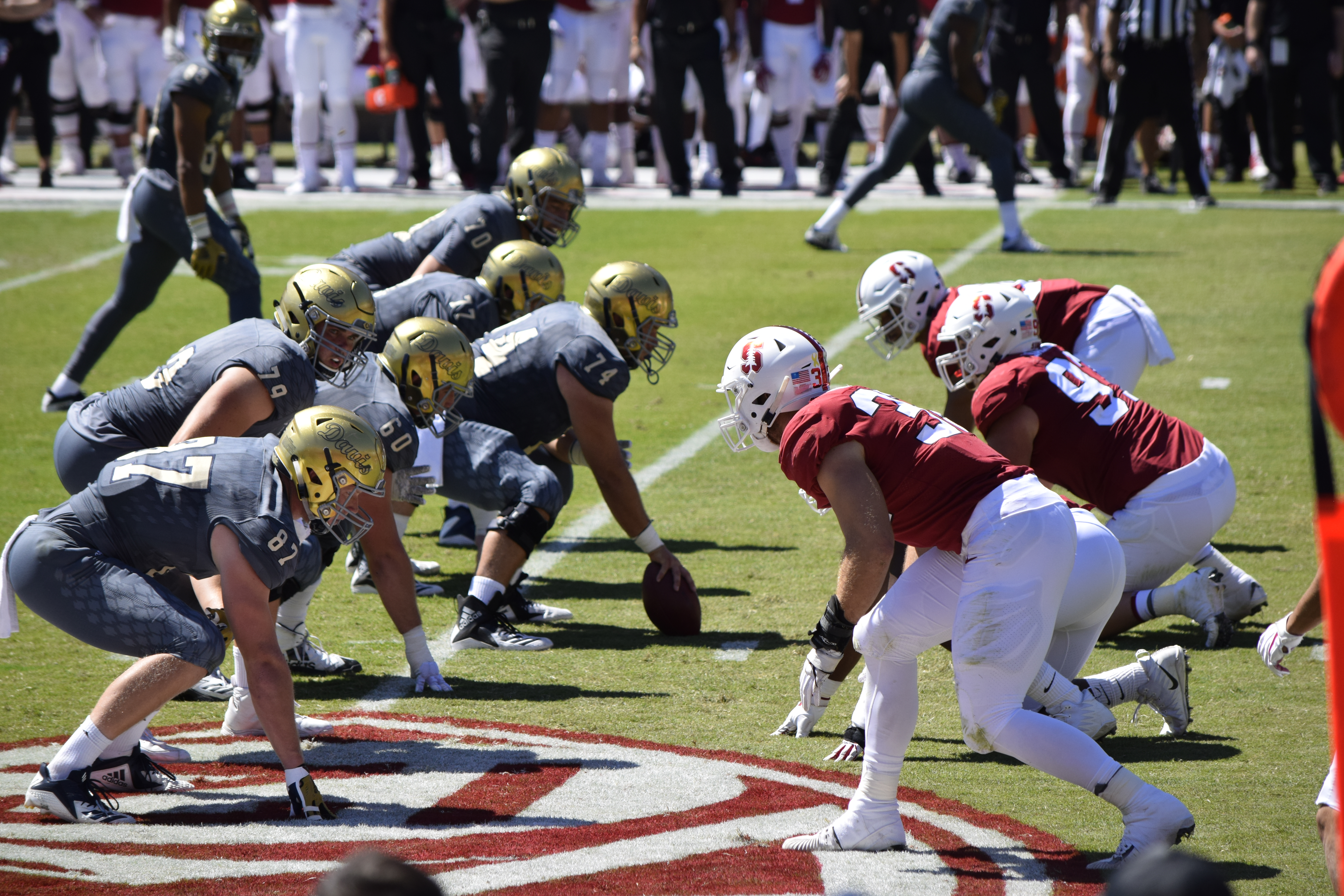
The Aggies line up against Stanford in 2018

The UC Davis Aggies football team represents UC Davis in the NCAA Division I Football Championship Subdivision (FCS). The football program's first season took place in 1915 and has fielded a team each year since with the exception of 1918 during World War I and from 1943 to 1945 during World War II, when the campus, then known as the University Farm, was shut down. The team plays its home games at the 10,473-seat UC Davis Health Stadium.

UC Davis competed as a member of the NCAA College Division through 1972; from 1973 to 2003, the Aggies competed as an NCAA Division II program. In 2004, UC Davis promoted its football program to the Division I FCS (then I-AA) level and joined the Great West Conference (then known as the Great West Football Conference) after one season as an independent team with exploratory status. After their provisional seasons and the construction of a new stadium, UC Davis became a full member of Division I in 2007 and eligible for the postseason.

Throughout its history, the football program won 31 conference championships. Between 1929 and 1992, the Aggies captured 27 outright or shared Northern California Athletic Conference championships, including 20 in a row from 1971 to 1990, an American West Conference title in 1993 (co-champion), and GWFC/GWC championships in 2005 (co-champ) and 2009. The Aggies won their first football title as a Division I program in 2018 as one of the Big Sky Conference's three regular season champions.

Year	Round	Opponent	Result
2018	Second Round; Quarterfinals	Northern Iowa; Eastern Washington	W, 23–16; L, 29–34
2021	First Round	South Dakota State	L, 24–56
2024	Second Round; Quarterfinals	Illinois State; South Dakota	W, 42–10; L, 21–35
2025	Second Round; Quarterfinals	Rhode Island; Illinois State	W, 47–26; L, 31–42

=== Men's soccer ===
The UC Davis Men's soccer team have been Big West Conference Tournament Champions in 2019 and 2024, and have advanced to the NCAA Division I Tournament four times (2007, 2008, 2019, and 2024) in program history. The UC Davis Aggies men's soccer team have an NCAA Division I Tournament record of 1–4 through four appearances.

Year	Round	Opponent	Result
2007	First Round	California	L 1–2
2008	First Round; Second Round	Denver; Michigan	W 4–0; L 1–2
2019	Second Round	Louisville	L 0–1
2024	First round	San Diego	L 0–1

=== Men's water polo ===
The UC Davis Aggies men's water polo team has won seven WWPA title, including back-to-back championships in 2021 and 2022. The Aggies have appeared in the NCAA Division I Tournament nine times in the program's history.

Year	Round	Opponent	Result
1974	First Round	CSU Fullerton	L 4–7
1975	First Round	UC Irvine	L 4–19
1996	Semifinals	UCLA	L 6–18
1997	Semifinals	Pepperdine	L 8–13
2016	Quarterfinals	Harvard	L 15–16
2017	Quarterfinals	Pacific	L 12–13

=== Men's Tennis ===
2015, 2023 Big West Tri-Champions. In 2015, the Aggies earned a program-best 17 wins at the Division I level. In 2016, Alec Adamson became the first UC Davis men's tennis player to be named the Big West Player of the Year and was the first Aggie at the Division I level to earn a berth into the NCAA Singles Tournament, finishing the year ranked No. 108 in the nation according to the Intercollegiate Tennis Association's final poll.

=== Men's Track and Field ===
Ngoni Makusha, a 2008 Olympian, two-time track athlete of the year and former Drake assistant track and field coach, is UC Davis' men's and women's track & field head coach.

UC Davis sprinter Matthew Okonkwo captured a share of the Big West Conference Male Track Athlete of the Year in 2022. Okonkwo captured Big West individual titles in each of the 200- and 400-meter dashes at the championship meet, while helping both relay squads to top-three finishes. He had the league's fastest 400 time of the year, breaking Brian Thomas' school record with a time of 46.36 seconds at the CSUN Red & Black Invite on April 2. Okonkwo's winning 21.23 clocking in the 200 at conference currently ranks second in the Big West and fourth in school history.

School Records

=== Men's Golf ===
UC Davis men's golf has tallied 41 team wins and 53 individual victories dating back to 1993.

School Records

=== Men's Cross Country ===
UC Davis captured its first Big West Championship in 2010 when individual conference champion Jonathan Peterson led the Aggies to their historic victory.

Records

=== Beach Volleyball ===
UC Davis added beach volleyball ahead of the 2019 season, joining Equestrian as the department's newest sports. The Aggies opened their historic first season with a 2–0 record and enjoyed success in their most recent campaign, posting their best start to a season (9–0) in program history.

=== Field Hockey ===
UC Davis added field hockey ahead of the 2009 season, competing in the NorPac conference. The Aggies joined the American East in 2015 and remain in the conference heading into 2023. UC Davis has not posted a winning season since the program's inception, but finished just one game below .500 (8–9) in 2019.

=== Women's Track and Field ===
In less than half a decade, UC Davis women's track & field boasted three finalists – including two winners – for the NCAA Woman of the Year Award, which honors excellence and leadership in athletics, academics and in the community. Founded in 1991, the award stands as one of the highest honors that national governing body bestows upon an individual. Since then, UC Davis is the only Division II institution to have won the award and is one of just two schools to have three winners (Aggie lacrosse player Kelly Albin captured the honor in 2004). Hundreds of student-athletes are nominated annually, from which one winner is chosen for each state plus the District of Columbia and Puerto Rico. From those 52 state-level honorees, the NCAA selects 10 finalists. The winner is then chosen at an annual televised banquet. Remarkably, the Aggies’ All-American 4x400 relay team at the 1999 NCAA Outdoor Championships featured three finalists: 2001 finalist Kameelah Elarms was the leadoff runner, 2002 winner Tanisha Silas ran the third leg and 1999 winner Jamila Demby served as the anchor.

Records

=== Equestrian ===
UC Davis added Equestrian ahead of the 2019 season and the program instantly enjoyed success, earning their first ECAC Championship in 2023. The young team repeated their conference championship in 2024, and qualified for Nationals for the first time in program history as the #8 ranked team in the nation. It was announced on January 9, 2026, that following the 2026 season, Equestrian would be downgraded to club status, and STUNT would be elevated to varsity status in its place.

=== Women's Golf ===
UC Davis women's golf is led by the three-time Big West Golfer of the Year and former LPGA Tour professional Demi Runas. Runas was the first Aggie to earn her LPGA Tour card. The Aggies have posted 23 team wins as well as 22 individual victories since the program started in 2005, also making four NCAA Tournament appearances (2008, 2011, 2013, 2015) over that time.

=== Gymnastics ===
Led by Cal Aggie Athletics Hall of Fame student-athlete Tanya Ho, UC Davis gymnastics earned their first conference title since 2015 after a brilliant 2023 campaign. Ho guided the Aggies to the MPSF title as the No. 2 championship seed with a team national qualifying score of 195.965. UC Davis broke 196 in five meets, including the 196.200 en route to the team title. The Aggies totaled three of the MPSF's top-nine all-time scores in the final month of the regular season, including the No. 2 all-time ranking of 196.750. The last eight meets of the season all went for at least 195.250.

Records

=== Women's Soccer ===
UC Davis' six conference wins in 2022 were the most by any UCD team since joining the Big West. UC Davis women's soccer is yet to win a conference title at the Division I level.

=== Women's Cross Country ===
UC Davis has won three Big West Conference titles (2011, 2014, 2021) since it ascended to the Division I level in 2007.

Records

=== Women's Tennis ===
In March, 2020, UC Davis women's tennis also earned an NCAA Public Recognition Award for an outstanding Academic Progress Rate (APR) by posting its 12th perfect score in program history. This is the highest total of any men's or women's team sponsored by the Big West. As a Division II team, UC Davis captured the California Collegiate Athletic Association title three times in a row from 1999 to 2002.

=== Women's Lacrosse ===
UC Davis became a Big 12 affiliate member for that conference's first season of women's lacrosse in 2024–25, following the 2024 collapse of its former women's lacrosse home of the Pac-12 Conference. The Aggies had only joined Pac-12 women's lacrosse in 2023–24. Led by three-time Mountain Pacific Sports Federation (MPSF) Coach of the Year (2018, 2019, 2021), Suzanne Isidor captured her first conference title in 2021, leading the Aggies to a program-best 12–4 record.

UC Davis has effectively been a partner of fellow California school San Diego State, with both teams having been in MPSF women's lacrosse until that conference dropped women's lacrosse after the 2021 season. Both played as independents for two seasons until joining Pac-12 women's lacrosse for the 2024 season. The Aggies faced five Pac-12 opponents in 2022, posting wins over Cal and Oregon while also going 1–1 against San Diego State.

=== Women's Volleyball ===
UC Davis women's volleyball ascended to the Division I level ahead of the 2004 season and have not won a conference title since the reclassification. Head Coach Dan Conners will enter his 10th season in 2023.

=== Softball ===
UC Davis Softball ascended to the Division I level in 2008 and claimed their first Big West Conference title in 2010 under Head Coach Karen Yoder.

=== Women's Water Polo ===
UC Davis women's water polo earned a share of the Big West Conference title in 2009, their first championship in program history at the Division I level. In 2015, the Aggie made history by winning the Big West Conference Tournament to punch their ticket to the NCAA Tournament.

=== Women's Swimming and Diving ===
UC Davis swimming and diving has captured four MPSF titles (2011, 2013, 2014, 2016) since its ascension to the Division I level. In 2016, Hilvy Cheung raced in the NCAA prelim for the 200m butterfly, making the Aggies' first appearance on the national stage.

Records

== Championships ==
=== Team championships ===
UC Davis has not won a national championship at the NCAA Division I level, but previously won eight national championships at the NCAA Division II level.

==== NCAA Division II National Championships ====
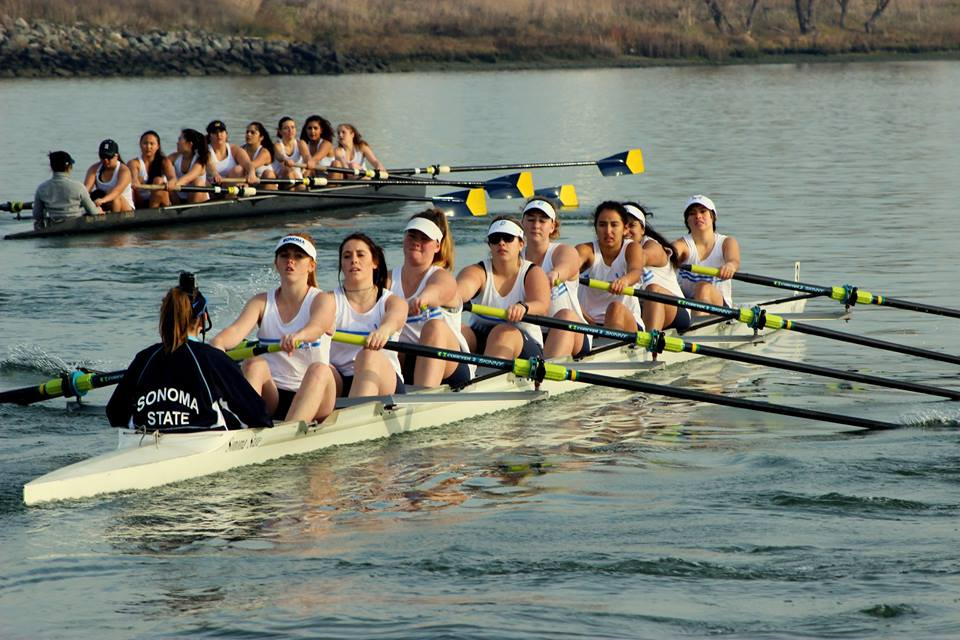
Women's rowing team competing in 2017

- Men's basketball: 1998
- Men's golf: 1979
- Women's rowing: 2002, 2003
- Softball: 2003
- Men's tennis: 1992
- Women's tennis: 1990, 1993

==== Non-NCAA National Championships ====
- Women's gymnastics – Division III: 1981 (AIAW)
- Women's tennis – Division III: 1980, 1981 (AIAW)

=== Team tournament appearances ===
==== NCAA ====
- Baseball (1): 2008
- Men's basketball (1): 2017
- Women's basketball (3): 2011, 2019, 2021
- Football (2): 2018, 2021
- Women's golf (4): 2008, 2011, 2013, 2015
- Women's gymnastics (3): 1998, 2014, 2023
- Men's soccer (3): 2007, 2008, 2019
- Softball (1): 2010
- Men's outdoor track and field (2): 1941, 1974
- Women's indoor track and field (1): 2019
- Women's outdoor track and field (6): 2012, 2013, 2015, 2017, 2018, 2019
- Men's water polo (9): 1974, 1975, 1996, 1997, 2016, 2017, 2019, 2021, 2022
- Women's water polo (3): 2006, 2008, 2015

=== Individual championships ===
At the NCAA Division II level, UC Davis garnered 72 individual championships.

NCAA individual championships
Order	School year	Athlete(s)	Sport	Source
1	1940–41	Elton Tobiasson	Boxing	
2	2006–07	Derek Moore	Wrestling	

== Athletic facilities ==
- Aggie Field Hockey Facility – field hockey
- Aggie Soccer Field – men's and women's soccer
- Edwards Family Athletics Center
- Hickey Gymnasium – administrative offices and basketball, gymnastics, volleyball practice centers
- La Rue Field – softball
- Marya Welch Tennis Center – men's and women's tennis
- University Credit Union Center – men's and women's basketball, women's gymnastics, women's volleyball
- Phil Swimley Field at Dobbins Stadium – baseball
- Schaal Aquatics Center – women's swimming and diving, men's and women's water polo
- Toomey Weight Room
- UC Davis Health Stadium – football and lacrosse
- UC Davis Beach Volleyball Courts – women's beach volleyball
- Woody Wilson Track at Toomey Field – men's and women's outdoor track and field

== Traditions ==
=== Colors, mascot, and spirit ===
The official school colors are blue and gold. The blue is due to the UC's early connection to Yale and as a result was referred to as "Yale Blue", but UC Davis' official blue, usually called "Aggie Blue", Pantone 295 differs from Yale Blue (approximately Pantone 289).

The official school mascot is a mustang named Gunrock. The name dates to 1921 when the US Army brought a horse named Gun Rock to UC Davis to supply high-quality stock for cavalry horses; the mustang mascot was selected to honor that cavalry horse. Students at UC Davis are referred to as Aggies in honor of the school's agricultural heritage. Unlike most colleges, there is a distinction between the name for students and the mascot. There was a movement to change the school's mascot from the mustang to the cow, but despite student support this was turned down after opposition from alumni.

UC Davis students gather at sporting events to rally as the Aggie Pack, the largest student-run school spirit organization in the United States, which supports its intercollegiate athletics teams to the music of the UC Davis Marching Band.

== Rivalries ==
The highlight of the four-year transition to Division I occurred on September 17, 2005, when the Aggies football team defeated the heavily favored Stanford Cardinal at Stanford Stadium by a score of 20–17 on a touchdown pass with eight seconds left in the game. The Aggies also pulled off an upset against Stanford in basketball just months later, beating the Cardinal 64–58 with a late rally at home on December 4, 2005. Wins in these two major sports, with the addition of victories against the Cardinal in soccer, wrestling and two wins in baseball pulled the Aggies' men's sports' win–loss record against Stanford to 5–1 for the 2005–06 season.

Aggie football plays Sacramento State in the annual Causeway Classic for a trophy made from Yolo Causeway cement (formerly the Causeway Carriage). The Causeway Classic is part of a larger competition, the Causeway Cup, that tracks head-to-head meetings between the schools' common intercollegiate athletics programs.

The football team also faces Cal Poly in the annual Battle for the Golden Horseshoe.

== Former varsity sports ==
On April 20, 2010, the school announced that four sports, women's rowing, men's swimming and diving, men's indoor track and field, and wrestling, would be eliminated due to a financial crisis and cuts in state funding.

Prior to 2010, the last time UC Davis had discontinued a sport was men's gymnastics in 1987.

== Non-varsity sports ==
=== Rugby ===
Colby "Babe" Slater, won gold medals with the U.S. rugby national team at the 1920 and 1924 Olympics, and was captain of the 1924 team.

The UC Davis Aggies won the men's 2015 DI-AA college rugby championship by defeating Central Florida in the final 18–15 at Kennesaw State University's Fifth Third Bank Stadium. The men repeated as the 2016 D1-AA as national champions by defeating the Notre Dame College of South Euclid, Ohio, in the final by a score of 17–13.

The UC Davis Aggies won the women's 2016 D1 college rugby national championship by defeating the University of Virginia, 30–25, at Saint Mary's College in Moraga, California.

Club national team championships

- Co-ed archery (1): 2015 (USA Archery)
- Men's archery (1): 2016 (USA Archery)
- Women's archery (1): 2016 (USA Archery)
- Men's boxing (1): 2013 (USIBA)
- Co-ed cycling (4): 1994, 2001, 2006, 2009 (USA Cycling)
- Men's polo (2): 1975, 1979 (USPA)
- Men's rugby (2) – Division I-AA: 2015, 2016 (USA Rugby)
- Women's rugby – Division I (2): 2016, 2017 (USA Rugby)
- Women's ultimate (2): 1989, 2004 (USA Ultimate)
- Co-ed water skiing – Division II (1): 2013 (NCWSA)

Note: For sports with no division noted, the title was earned at the top-most level.
