= UC Davis Marching Band =

Marching band of the University of California, Davis

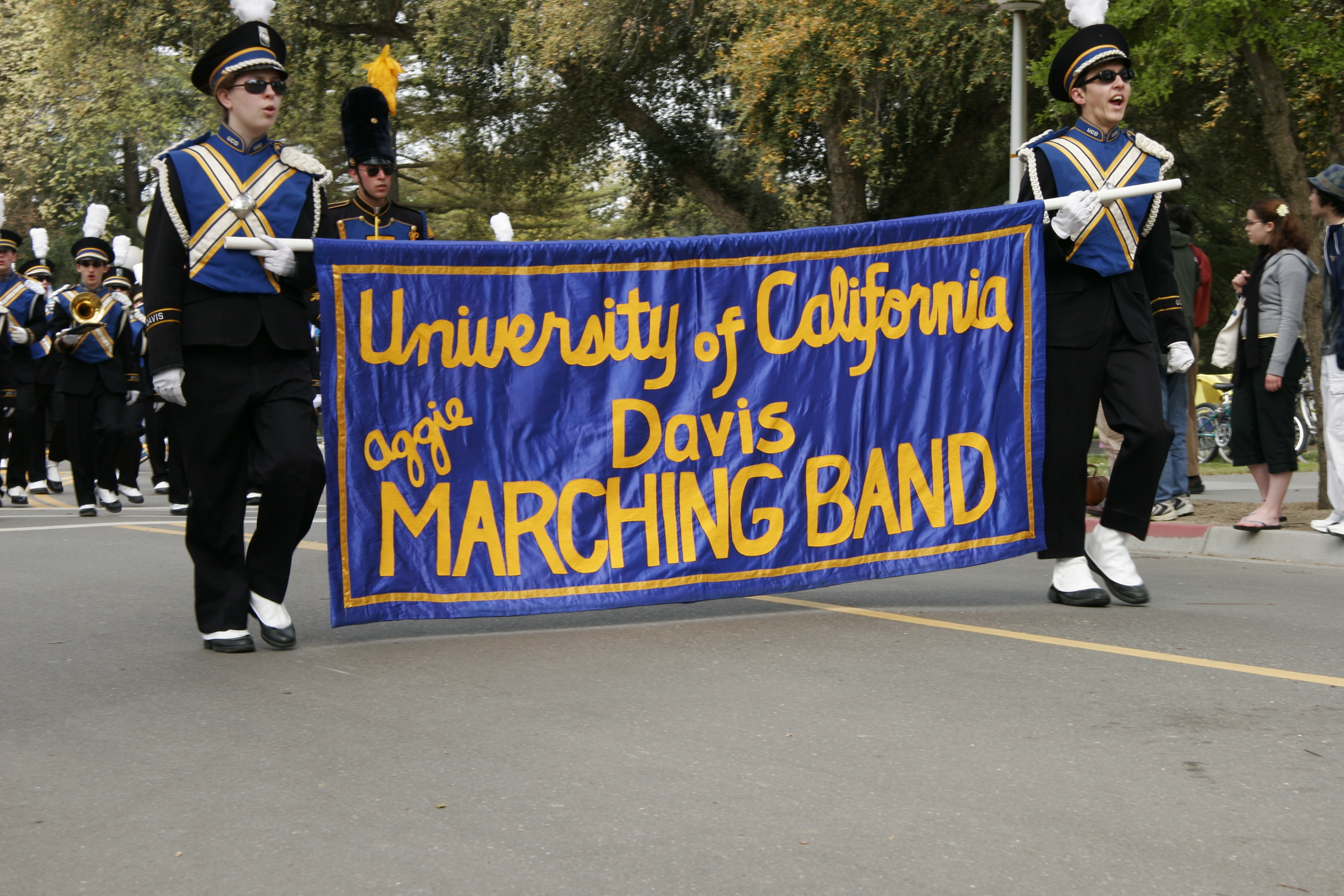
- Nickname: Cal Aggie Marching Band-uh!, Band-uh!, CAMB (formerly)
- School: University of California, Davis
- Location: Davis, CA
- Founded: 1929–2019 (original), 2019
- Director: Dr. Garrett Rigsby
- Assistant Director: Matthew Okumoto
- Members: 175
- Fight song: "Aggie Fight"
- Website: https://campusrecreation.ucdavis.edu/band

The UC Davis Marching Band is the official marching band of the University of California, Davis, organized in fall of 2019. It is the successor to the student-run California Aggie Marching Band-uh!, which existed from 1920s to 2019. As of 2025, the UCDMB has roughly 200 members. It performs at home (and occasional away) games to cheer on the UC Davis Aggies sports teams, marches in parades, and plays at events on the UC Davis campus as well as in the greater Northern California area.

UC Davis administrators ordered the permanent dissolution of the student-run Band-uh in the fall of 2019, after accusations of repeated misconduct and an investigation by an outside law firm. At the same time, the university announced formation of a new, university-administered organization called the "UC Davis Marching Band."

== History ==
UC Davis has had a marching band since 1922, when E. H. Barger of the school's veterinary science department formed an 18-member group. That band disbanded after interest waned.

The next incarnation of the band was formed in 1929 by J. Price Gittinger as a pep band for home football games. There were 15 original members, all male. The first female members joined within two years. The band grew in the coming decades, especially once the campus reopened after WWII. In the early 1960s, the student body voted to exclude women from the Band-uh!, as it was now called, after no women showed up for a game, although also allegedly to give the band a rowdier, more masculine spirit. During the women's rights movement in the early 1970s, pressure mounted to reopen the band to women, in part to comply with Title VII of the Civil Rights Act of 1964. By 1973, the Band-uh! once again had female members.

The Band-uh! was historically associated with controversial and obscene antics. It was reprimanded several times in the 1970s, and in 1992 the band was put on probation after a sexual harassment charge was made against the student director. In 2008, the staff director of the band, who was not a student, filed a sexual harassment complaint to the university after several incidents involving the removal of shirts, offensive language and gestures, and lewd behavior. In October 2008, he left temporarily on a "leave of absence because of all the band stress." On April 4, 2019, The California Aggie newspaper published an article citing former Band-uh! members' experiences with hazing, sexual assault, and other forms of misconduct.

The Band-uh! released three albums of its music, The Cal Aggie Marching Band in 1983, Barn Party in 1998 and Noise Violation in 2002. The band's catalog was composed of its traditional marching songs, such as the "Aggie Fight" song, as well as renditions of popular rock songs such as Green Day's "Welcome to Paradise", Edgar Winter's "Frankenstein", and Jefferson Airplane's "White Rabbit", among many others.

In April 2019, multiple accusations of hazing, sexual assault, and general misconduct instigated by current members of the now-dissolved Band-uh! and some of its alumni led to an investigation into the band's traditions and culture. Five months later, in September 2019, the UC Davis administration issued a public statement officially declaring that the student-run Band-uh! would "no longer exist" in its previous form. School officials announced plans to completely restructure the marching band with strict oversight, a faculty director, and entirely new bylaws.

The newly formed "UC Davis Marching Band" made their public performance debut on September 28, 2019, at a home football game against Montana.

== Structure ==
The UC Davis Marching Band has an officer council consisting of 12 student officers, such as the Drum Major, Student Director, and Band Manager (the Big Three), among others, all being equal for voting rights in council meetings. Officers are elected by their peers every spring, and serve one year terms. The officers work in conjunction with the Faculty directors to manage the band. Each section in the band also had two section leaders, who manage their sections and act as a point of contact between the officer council and the general members.

Participation is open to any and all UC Davis students, with no audition in order to join, and musicians of all experience levels accepted. The band is an entirely volunteer organization, and members are not compensated by units or scholarship money of any kind.

For football games and parades, the UCDMB wears their formal, blue and gold, "full dress" marching uniforms. Prior to 2019, for other sports games and most other gigs, members wore their more casual white collared shirt, blue jeans, and button-laden floppy hat outfits, known as the "Mav'rik Band uniform." In 2009, the band received new, custom-made full dress uniforms to replace the ones provided for by Warren Mooney in the late 1970s. As of the band's restructuring in 2019, when not in "full dress" they wear an "informal uniform" consisting of blue jeans, a navy blue "Cow Shirt," sunglasses, and a UCDMB baseball cap, frequently adorned with buttons.

== Instrumentation ==
There are 10 instrument sections within the UCDMB: Flutes (flutes and piccolos), Nets (clarinets), Altos (alto saxophones), Tenors (tenor saxophones), Baritax (baritone saxophones and baritone horns), Trumpets, Mellos (mellophones), Bones (trombones), Sousies (sousaphones), and Drums (snare drums, bass drums, tenor drums, cymbals, and glockenspiels).

== Traditions ==
The announcement used to present the Band at every Aggie home game was usually as follows, with occasional minor variations:

Pre 2019 Announcement
Fast, furious, and foaming at the mouth,
Bold, blue, and bitchin',
It's the pride of the Regents of the University of California,
The spirit of the Davis Campus,
The California Aggie Marching Band-uh!

UC Davis Marching Band version 2019 and onward
Fast, furious, and foaming at the mouth,
Bold, blue, and blazin',
It's the pride of the Regents of the University of California,
The spirit of the Davis Campus,
It‘s the UC Davis, Marching Band!
