= Pauley Pavilion =

Sporting arena on the campus of UCLA in Los Angeles

- Nell and John Wooden Court

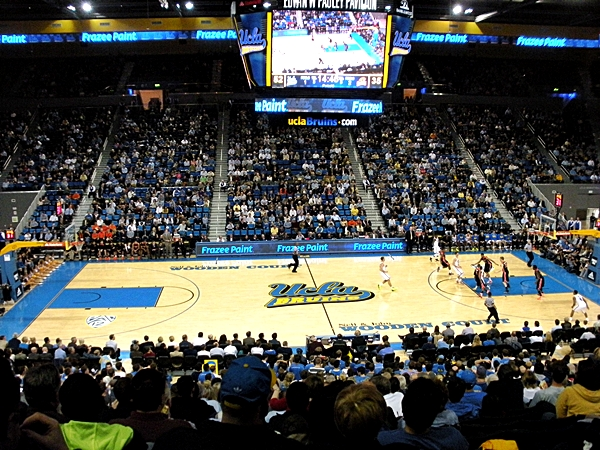
- The inside of Pauley Pavilion with the new center circle and scoreboards in January 2013

- Location in L.A. metro area Location in California Location in the United States
- Full name: Edwin W. Pauley Pavilion
- Address: 301 Westwood Plaza
- Location: Los Angeles, California
- Coordinates: 34.070211°N 118.446775°W
- Owner: The University of California, Los Angeles
- Operator: University of California, Los Angeles
- Capacity: 12,829 (1965–2011); 13,800 (2012–present)
- Current use: Basketball; Volleyball; Gymnastics

Construction
- Groundbreaking: January 1964
- Opened: June 11, 1965; 61 years ago
- Cost: $5 million (original construction – 1965) $136 million (renovation – 2012)
- Architects: Welton Becket (original construction – 1965); NBBJ (renovation – 2012)
- Structural engineers: Richard R. Bradshaw, Inc.
- General contractor: Miller-Davis Company

Tenants
- UCLA Bruins (NCAA) (1965–present); men's and women's basketball; men's and women's volleyball; women's gymnastics

Website
- uclabruins.com/pauley-pavilion

The Edwin W. Pauley Pavilion, commonly known as Pauley Pavilion, is an indoor arena located in the Westwood Village district of Los Angeles, California, on the campus of UCLA. It is home to the UCLA Bruins men's and women's basketball teams. The men's and women's volleyball and women's gymnastics teams also compete here. All teams, except for the men's volleyball team, compete in the Big Ten Conference.

The building, designed by architect Welton Becket, was dedicated in June 1965, named for University of California Regent Edwin W. Pauley, who had matched the alumni contributions. Pauley donated almost one fifth of the more than $5 million spent in constructing the arena. The arena was renovated in 2010–12 and was reopened on November 9, 2012, when it hosted a men's basketball game against Indiana State.

== Features ==
Pauley Pavilion contains 11,307 permanent theater-style upholstered seats, plus retractable seats for 2,492 spectators (466 seats without backs used by the band and students), making a total basketball capacity of 13,800. The capacity prior to the renovation (12,829) had been exceeded several times for several men's basketball games by adding portable seating alongside the retractable seats. The Bruins reopened the newly renovated Pauley Pavilion on November 9, 2012, in front of a record crowd of 13,513. Then a new record was set when 13,727 fans watched the Bruins defeat the Arizona Wildcats 74–69 on March 2, 2013.

When the floor seats are retracted, there is space for three full-sized basketball courts. These courts are used for team practice, intramural games, and pickup basketball games. It can also serve as a convention hall or large dining area when in this configuration.

When used for men's volleyball, the basketball court is striped with colored tape. The volleyball net is erected at the half court line. The women's team uses blue and yellow Sport Court lined up perpendicularly to the basketball court tucked up to the east end of the court.

There is a tunnel on the south side through which trucks and service vehicles may enter. This is also the "backstage" entrance for players, performers, and broadcast personnel.

The floor is called "Nell and John Wooden Court" in honor of former UCLA Men's Basketball Coach John Wooden and his wife Nell.

== UCLA Men's Basketball seating ==
From the opening of the building until 1987, the extra press not involved in the radio or television broadcasts sat behind the south side (team bench side) press table. The working press then moved to sit courtside at "press row" on the northern side of the court, as the south courtside seats were opened up to influential and affluent boosters. In 2003, the UCLA Athletic Department made available north side courtside seats to affluent donors. The media now sit higher up in permanent seating dead-center in the north side of the bleachers. The press move to the north side in 1987 was as controversial as the 2003 move, in that the student section was now behind the press table and big donors had taken the south side courtside seats.

The student section has moved several times as well. Since 2014, the student section occupies the 100 level south side seats, as well as the west corner with overflow in the 200 level.

The UCLA Varsity Band has also moved to accommodate seating changes. Originally, they were located on the north courtside directly across from the UCLA bench. In 1984, they moved to the northeast corner courtside. In 1990 they moved to the north courtside directly across from the visitors bench. In 1996 they moved to the north side above the student section. In 2003, they moved to the west side of the arena to be courtside.

== History ==
=== 1960s ===
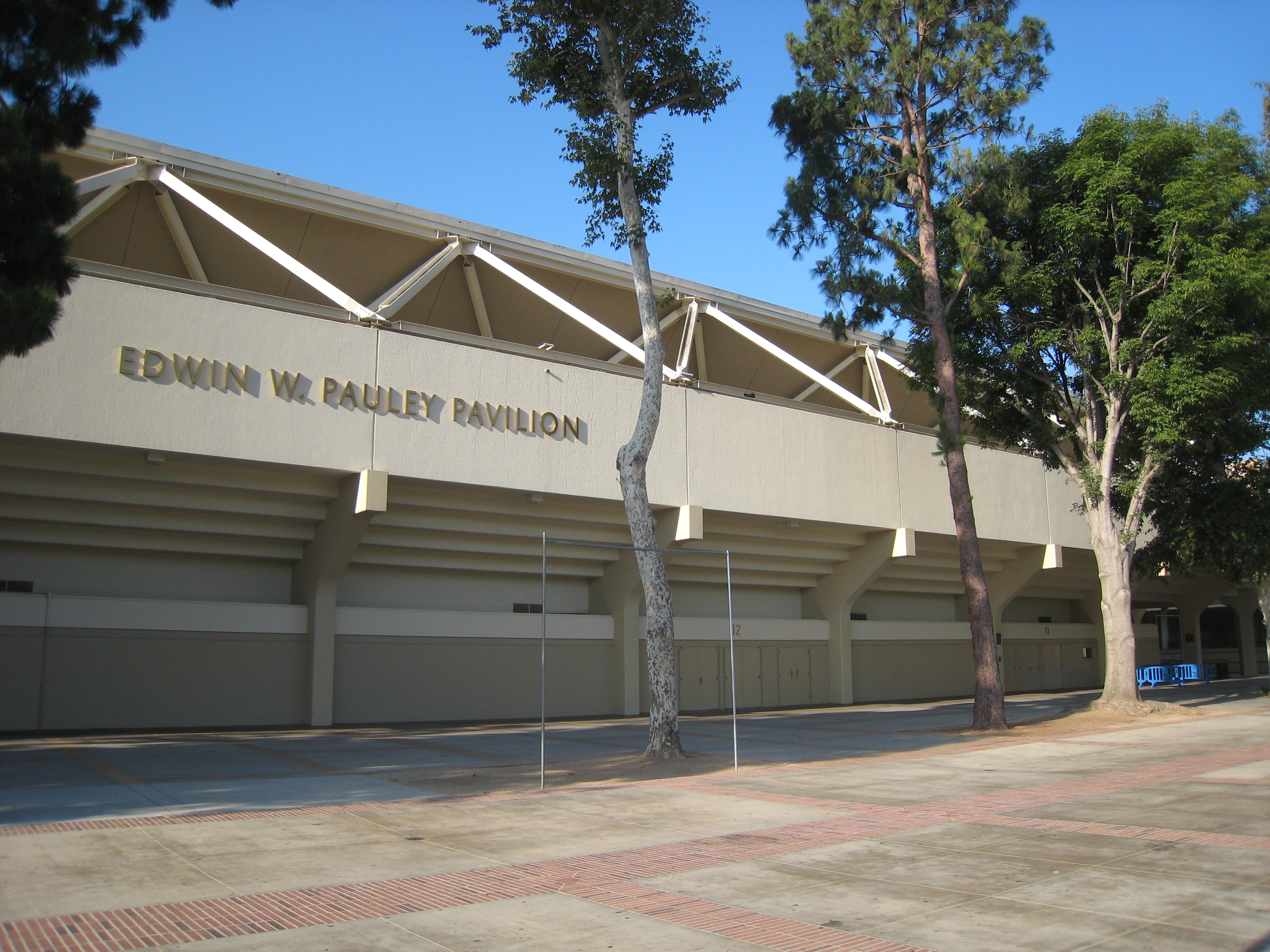
North side of Pauley Pavilion prior to the 2011-12 renovation

Before the construction of the Pavilion, the on-campus home to the UCLA Bruins men's basketball team was the 2,400-seat Men's Gym, currently known as the Student Activities Center, but then disparagingly known as the "B. O. barn." After John Wooden led the Bruins to the national championship in 1964, fans and Wooden felt that a more suitable arena needed to be constructed. However, it had been obvious even before then that the Bruins needed a new arena; since 1955 the Men's Gym's capacity had been limited to 1,500 by order of the Los Angeles fire marshal. Games that were expected to attract larger crowds were played at Pan Pacific Auditorium, the Los Angeles Memorial Sports Arena and other venues around Los Angeles.

Pauley Pavilion was constructed so that there would be some space between the crowds and the action on the court. Wooden cited the example of the close quarters of Cal's Harmon Gym (now Haas Pavilion) where fans would "pull leg hairs from his players' legs". Kareem Abdul-Jabbar, then known as Lew Alcindor, was recruited to UCLA partly on the promise of playing in the new arena.

- H.R. Haldeman (Chief of Staff of Nixon White House 1969–1973) headed the campaign to build a state-of-the-art sports arena. A million dollars was raised, which was matched by a donation from Edwin W. Pauley, who was a member of the Board of Regents of the University of California.
- The building was dedicated to Regent Edwin W. Pauley, at the June 1965 commencement ceremony by UCLA Chancellor Franklin D. Murphy.
- The facility opened for the 1965–1966 college basketball season. The first game ever played in Pauley Pavilion was on November 27, 1965. It featured the freshmen team, led by Lew Alcindor, against the UCLA varsity squad, the two-time defending champions and pre-season No. 1 team. The freshmen, led by Alcindor's 31 points and 21 rebounds, defeated the varsity team 75–60, a surprise considering the varsity squad had been chosen to finish number one in the nation in the preseason.
- Ohio State was the first visiting team in the regular season. The varsity Bruins defeated the Buckeyes in the inaugural game 92–66.
- Pauley Pavilion hosted its first NCAA Regional Finals in the 1969 post-season. The Bruins advanced from there to win the 1969 Championship.

=== 1970s ===
- John Wooden coached what would be his final game as varsity head coach in Pauley Pavilion March 1, 1975 in a 93–59 victory over Stanford. Four weeks later he would surprisingly announce his retirement following the NCAA semi-final victory against Louisville and before his 10th National championship victory against Kentucky. The Bruins won 150 games to 3 losses at home between 1965 and 1975, losing only to Cincinnati in 1965, Oregon in 1966, and Southern California in 1970. Bruin men's basketball teams won 8 more NCAA Men's Division I Basketball Championships from 1967 through 1975 under Coach Wooden.
- UCLA's longest winning streak in men's basketball at Pauley Pavilion was 98 games. It ended on February 21, 1976, when Oregon defeated UCLA, 65–45.
- The 1978 AIAW Women's Basketball Championship Final Four was hosted at Pauley Pavilion. UCLA defeated the University of Maryland, College Park 90–74 to win their first Women's basketball championship in front of a crowd of 9,531.
- The Grateful Dead performed here on November 20, 1971, November 17, 1973, December 30, 1978, and November 25, 1979.

=== 1980s ===
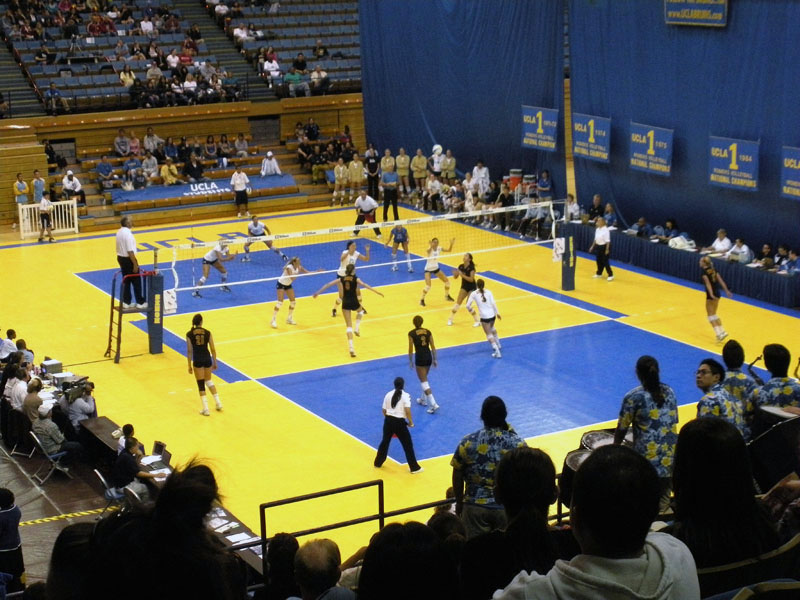
UCLA vs. USC volleyball 2008

- The first NCAA Women's Volleyball Championship was held at Pauley Pavilion in 1981, with UCLA falling to USC in the title match.
- The building was host to the 1984 NCAA Women's Division I Basketball Tournament. It was the third championship since the NCAA championship took precedence over the AIAW championship. The USC Trojan women's basketball team defeated the University of Tennessee Lady Vols 72–61.
- The building was the venue for gymnastics for the 1984 Summer Olympic Games.
- In the 1985 post-season, the Bruins hosted their first National Invitation Tournament (NIT) tournament games under coach Walt Hazzard. The Bruins won all three and advanced to the finals to win the 1985 National Invitation Tournament. In November 1985 at the intrasquad game, a banner was added in a ceremony commemorating the tournament championship. The banner was the same design as the NCAA championship banners, but slightly smaller. This banner subsequently was removed to make room for the 1995 National Championship banner.
- The 1987 Pacific-10 Conference men's basketball tournament, the first Pacific-10 Conference men's basketball tournament, was played in Pauley Pavilion in the 1987 post-season. The Bruins were the first tournament champions.
- The 1987 NCAA Men's Volleyball Championship was held in Pauley Pavilion. UCLA defeated USC 3–0 to win the title.
- On June 28, 1987, John Wooden and Dean Smith coached against each other in an exhibition basketball game featuring alumni from both schools. The North Carolina team defeated the UCLA team 116–111.
- In the 1989–1990 season, the building was celebrated in "25 years of Pauley". A book, Pauley Pavilion: College Basketball's Showplace by David Smale, was released commemorating the great teams that played there as well as great moments in the history of the building. The first jersey numbers of outstanding players were retired and displayed in the building (see below).
- The Grateful Dead performed here on June 29, 1980, and February 21, 1982.

=== 1990s ===
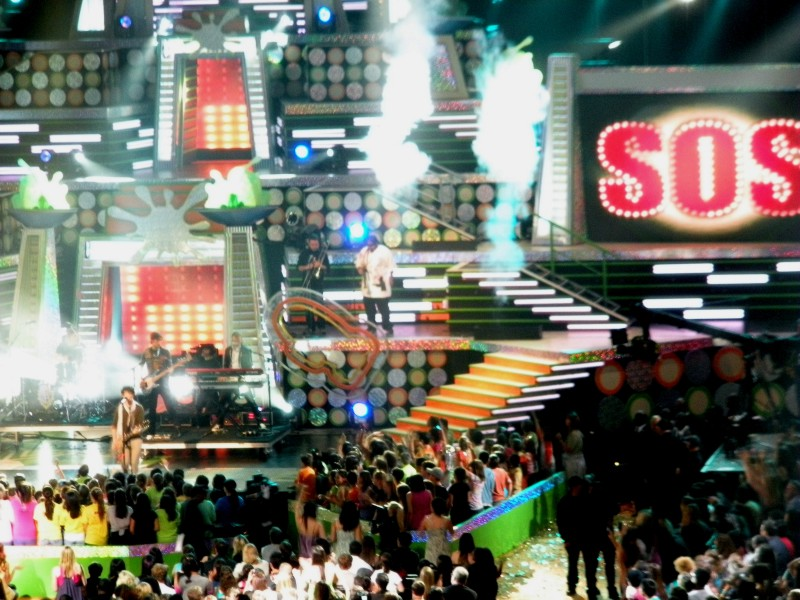
Pauley turned into the Kids' Choice Awards 2009

- The venue played host to the 1992 MTV Video Music Awards.
- UCLA's 75th anniversary convocation on May 20, 1994: "I'm proud to be here to honor the university's 75th anniversary, and to honor your chancellor on his 25th anniversary of service," President Bill Clinton told the crowd of more than 9,000. "It is the sort of commitment our country could do with more of, and I honor it."
- In 1995 the Bruins won their eleventh NCAA Men's Division I Basketball Championship, this time under coach Jim Harrick.
- On October 14, 1995, the first day of practice after UCLA won its eleventh national championship in basketball, the UCLA Men's and Women's Basketball teams held UCLA's first - and heretofore only - Midnight Madness ceremony. (In NCAA rules before the 2005 season, practices could not begin until midnight of the first day. Many schools would use this as an opportunity to build support for their teams by beginning the season publicly at the first possible minute.)

=== 2000s ===
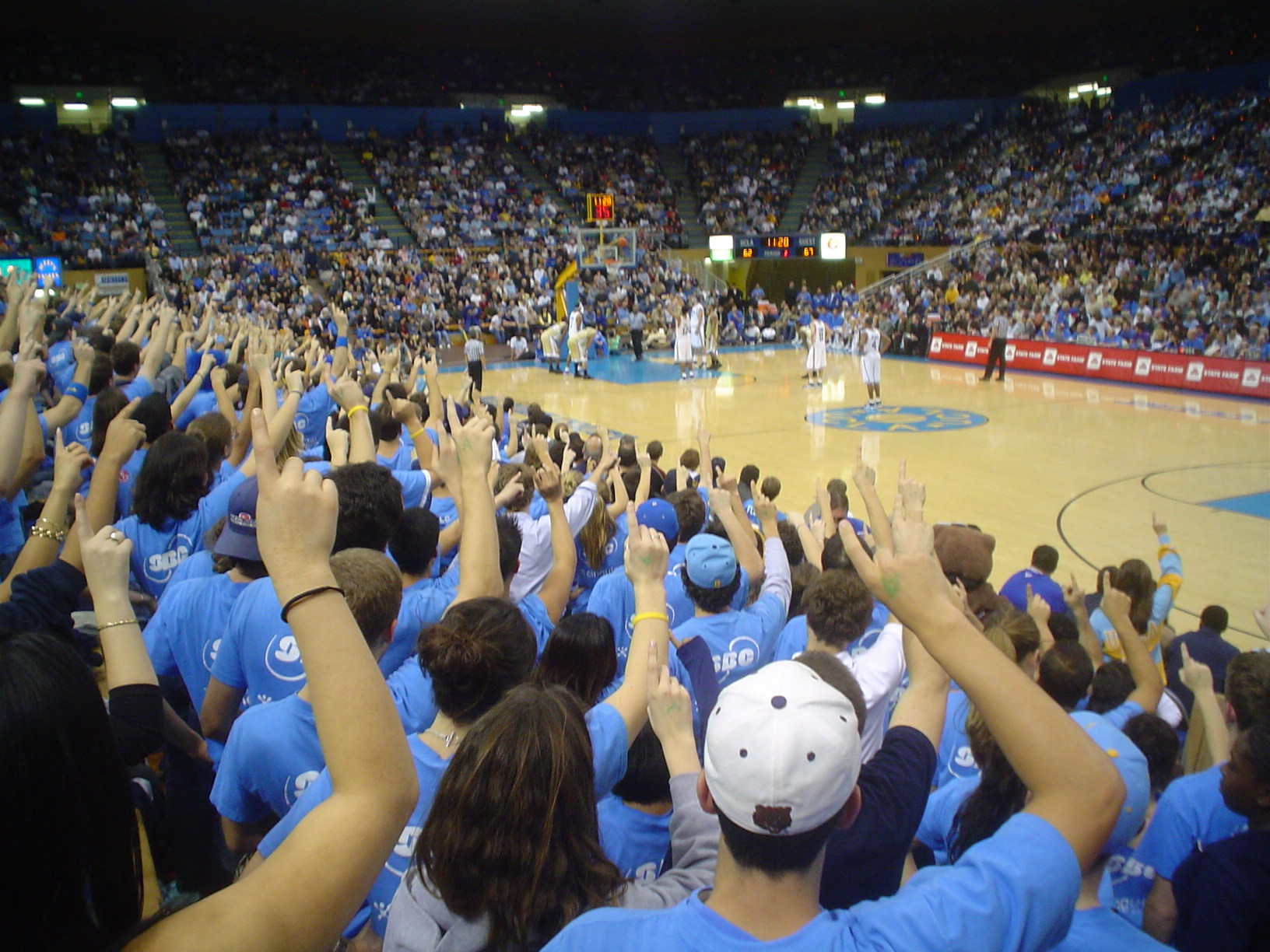
Men's Basketball game at Pauley Pavilion on 8 Jan 2005 when UCLA came from 22 down to upset Washington

- Former UCLA coach John Wooden and his late wife were honored on December 20, 2003, when the basketball floor at Pauley Pavilion was named "Nell & John Wooden Court." After his retirement, Coach Wooden was a fixture at UCLA Men's Basketball games until the year he died.
- The pavilion has played host to the numerous annual Nickelodeon Kids' Choice Awards, including the 21st show on March 29, 2008, with UCLA alum Jack Black as host. The ceremony moved to USC's Galen Center arena after the 2011 renovations.
- The 2001 Jeopardy! College Championship was taped at Pauley Pavilion (November 7–20, 2001). Vinita Kailasanath (Stanford University) was the winner. Jayce Newton represented UCLA.
- The Who were honored at the 2008 VH1 Rock Honors ceremony at the Pauley Pavilion instead of the usual Las Vegas. The concert consisted of an hour-long performance by the band as well as tributes by Incubus, Pearl Jam, Foo Fighters, Flaming Lips, Adam Sandler and Tenacious D.
- Barack Obama's presidential campaign held a rally at Pauley Pavilion on February 3, 2008, the Sunday before California's presidential primary election. The event featured speeches by Michelle Obama, Oprah Winfrey, Caroline Kennedy, Stevie Wonder, and California First Lady Maria Shriver.
- Game one of the WNBA Conference finals between Phoenix Mercury and Los Angeles Sparks, September 23, 2009.
- Jay-Z concert with Rihanna, on November 8, 2009. Enjoying their performances were Justin Timberlake, Jessica Biel, Nicole Richie, Samantha Ronson, James Blunt, and Jamie Foxx.

=== 2010s ===
- An eight-foot high bronze statue of Coach John Wooden by sculptor Blair Buswell was dedicated at the newly renovated arena on October 26, 2012. A men's basketball game against Indiana State on Friday, Nov. 9, 2012 was the first game at the new facility. The game honors Wooden's coaching career at both schools
- First non-athletics event after renovations, the LA Tennis Challenge was held on March 4, 2013, featuring the singles match of Tommy Haas vs. James Blake; and Novak Djokovic vs. Mardy Fish; and doubles match of Djokovic and Pete Sampras vs. Bob and Mike Bryan.
- The original center jump circle, used from the 1965 opening until 1982, was owned by a private collector. It was sold at auction for $325,000 in April 2013. It was reported as the highest paid amount for college basketball memorabilia at the time.
- Host site for first and second round of the 2014, 2016, 2017 NCAA women's basketball tournament
- Venue for Nickelodeon's annual Kids' Choice Sports.

=== 2020s ===
- 2022 NCAA Men's National Collegiate Volleyball Tournament, May 1–7, 2022
- In 2023 the UCLA Men's Basketball Team reached a nation leading 29 game home-winning streak.
- 2024 NCAA Division I women's basketball tournament first and second rounds, March 23 and 25, 2024
- On February 23, 2025, the UCLA Bruins defeated the Ohio State Buckeyes 69-61 at Pauley Pavilion. The game was marked by a tribute to Bill Walton, a two-time NCAA champion with UCLA, who died in May 2024. Additionally, UCLA's head coach, Mick Cronin, secured his 500th career victory, becoming the youngest active Division I men's head coach to reach this milestone at age 53.

== Kids' Choice Awards and Kids' Choice Sports ==
The venue has been used for the Nickelodeon Kids' Choice Awards. It first held the KCAs in 1995, then in 1998 and 1999, then from 2004 to 2010. When renovations began in 2011, the show was moved to the Galen Center. From 2014 to 2017, it became the venue for the Nickelodeon Kids' Choice Sports, a spin-off to the Nickelodeon Kids' Choice Awards. The KCSs then moved to Barker Hangar for 2018 and 2019.

== UCLA championship banners ==
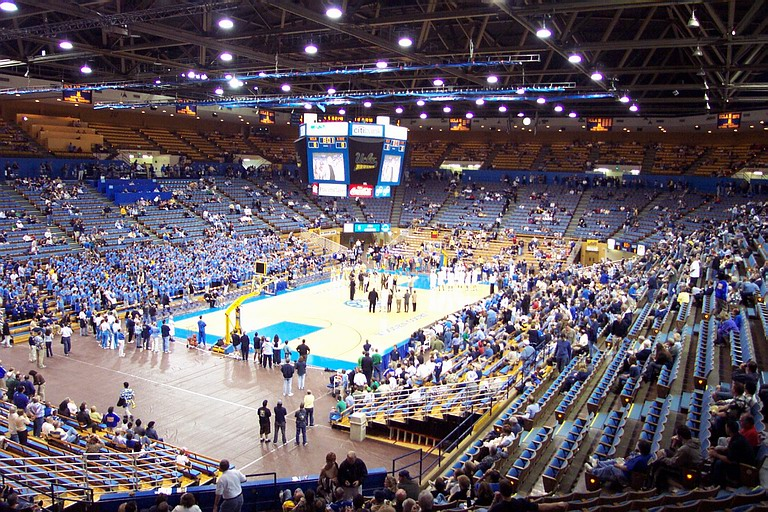
Pauley Pavilion, 2004 - six men's championship banners are visible

The only championship banners that are currently displayed within the building are for national or NCAA Championships. Unlike most schools, there are neither conference championship banners nor other tournament championship banners displayed in the building, despite the fact UCLA teams have won many tournaments and basketball championships in the Pac-12 Conference and its predecessor conferences. Former Bruin point guard, New Jersey Nets, LA native and former Los Angeles Lakers player Jordan Farmar described the rationale for this during the Bruins' 2005 Final Four run, by stating, "[a]t UCLA, only national championship banners go up." The men's banners are blue with gold lettering, while the women's banners are gold with blue lettering.

In 1985, UCLA won the NIT and promptly hung an NIT championship banner among the 10 existing NCAA championship banners. This banner remained in the rafters until 1995, when the Bruins won the NCAA title again and replaced the NIT banner with their 11th NCAA championship banner. During the 2012 renovation, replicas were created for some of the older banners, which were different sizes. The original banners were then sold at an auction.

There is one banner for the women's basketball AIAW championship in 1978. There are 11 individual banners for the NCAA Men's Division I Basketball Championship teams. There are two banners for volleyball, one for the 19 men's NCAA volleyball championships and one for the three NCAA women's volleyball championships and three AIAW championships. There are two banners for gymnastics, one for the two men's NCAA gymnastics champions, and one for the five NCAA women's gymnastics champions. The volleyball and gymnastics banners list all the years in which Bruin teams were NCAA or national champions.

== Retired numbers ==
The retired numbers of UCLA men's and women's basketball players are displayed in the rafters of Pauley Pavilion. On February 3, 1990, the first four UCLA basketball player jersey numbers were retired. This was the key moment in the "Pauley at 25" celebration of the first 25 years of the arena. The primary criteria for being chosen was that all four players were three-time All-Americans.

The initial honorees were:

- Ann Meyers #15
- Denise Curry #12
- Kareem Abdul-Jabbar (played under his original name of Lew Alcindor) #33
- Bill Walton #32

== Significant events ==
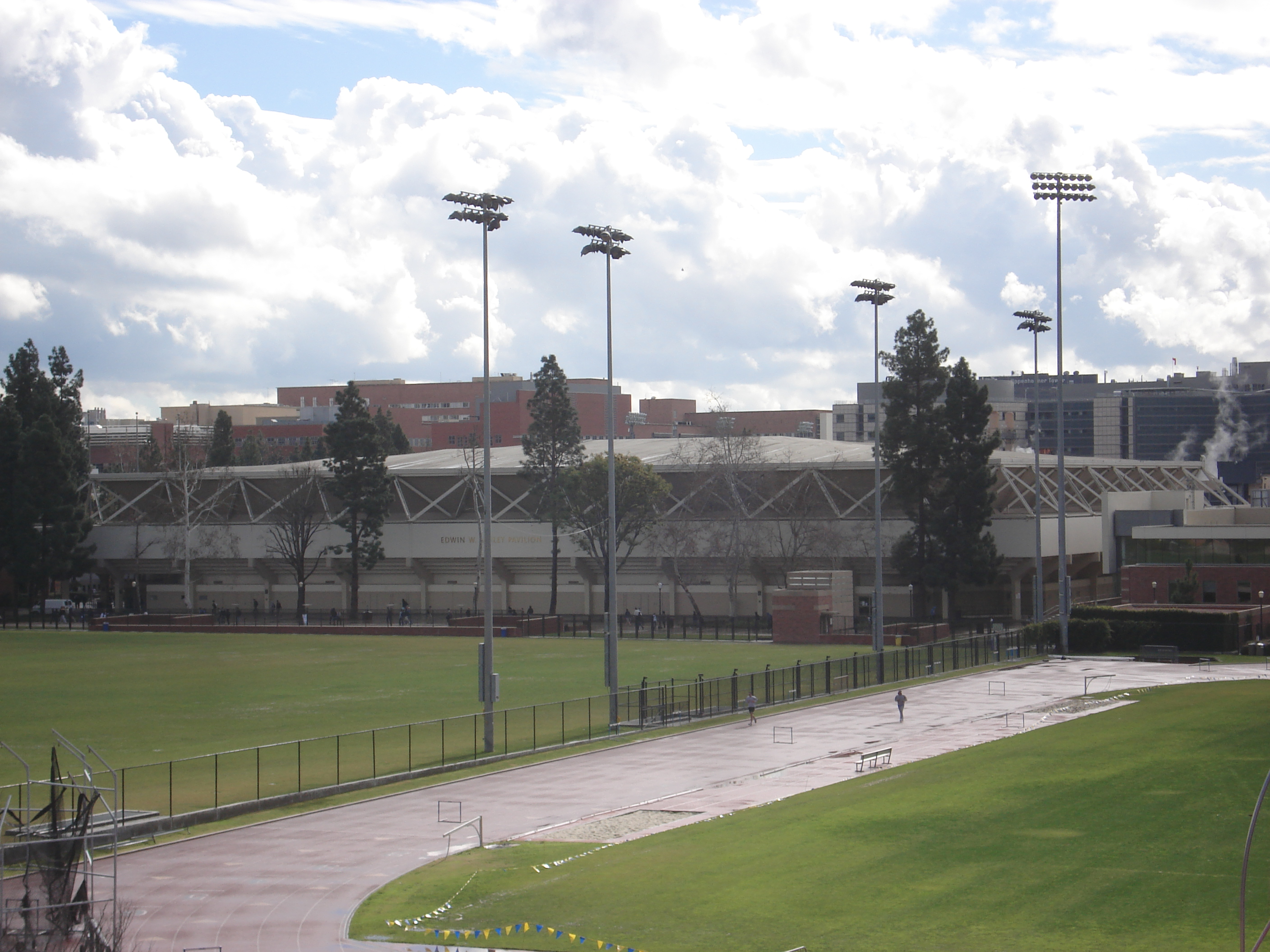
Pauley Pavilion prior to the renovation, view from Drake Stadium

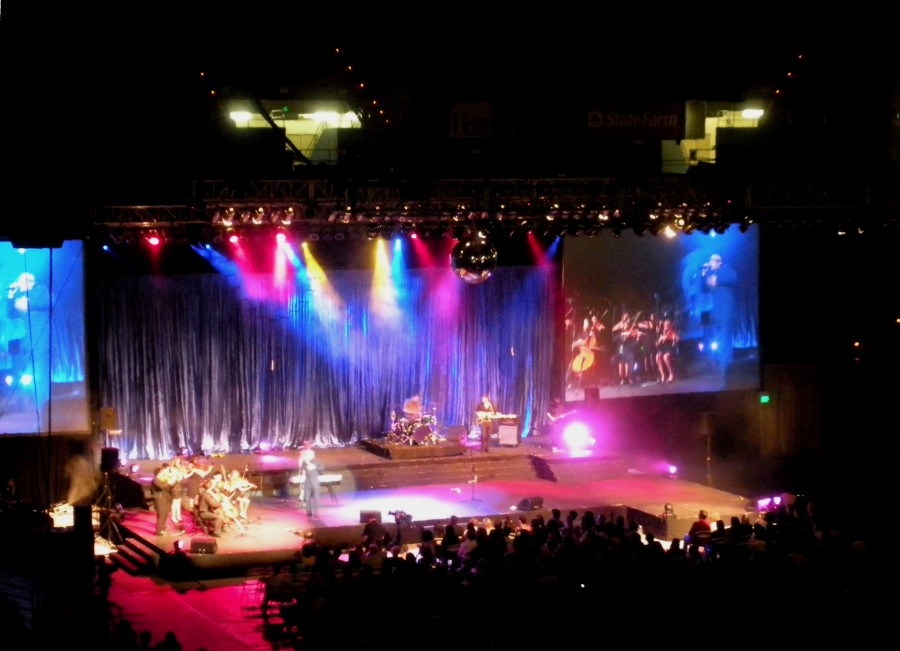
Spring Sing 2009 in Pauley

Pauley Pavilion has been the venue for many other sports championships, concerts, commencement ceremonies and political events.

Concert performers have included Bob Marley, Bad Religion, Bob Dylan, Diana Ross & the Supremes, Joni Mitchell, Van Morrison, Bob Hope, Frank Sinatra, Luciano Pavarotti, Eric Clapton, The Grateful Dead, Phish, Guns N' Roses, Metallica, and Faith No More, among others.

In 1970, Frank Zappa appeared with the Los Angeles Philharmonic Orchestra performing Zappa's orchestral music. Zubin Mehta directed the orchestra in what would become the soundtrack for Zappa's movie 200 Motels. Frank Zappa & the Mothers of Invention recorded Just Another Band from L.A. at the Pauley Pavilion in 1971, and was released in 1972.

In 1984, it was the Los Angeles venue for the 1984 Summer Olympics Men's and Women's gymnastics and Women's rhythmic gymnastics events. Mary Lou Retton became the first Olympic gymnast outside of Eastern Europe ever to have won the Olympic all-around title.

On April 26, 1986, a birthday tribute for actress/comedian Carol Burnett was held inside. Singer Neil Diamond performed "Sweet Caroline" in her honor.

Two years later in 1988, it was the site of a presidential election debate between George H. W. Bush and Michael Dukakis. Dukakis also held his final election-eve rally here, hosted by the UCLA Bruin Democrats.

In 1994, composer Henry Mancini, having learned he had terminal cancer, gave his last concert at Pauley Pavilion.

In 2009, UCLA Spring Sing made its Pauley Pavilion return on May 8, having switched from the smaller Los Angeles Tennis Center to this much larger venue due to its popularity and overwhelming demand.

On February 26, 2011, the Bruins hosted their last men's basketball home game against the Arizona Wildcats before extensive renovations were scheduled to begin. Tyler Trapani, great grandson of Coach John Wooden and member of UCLA's team, fittingly scored the last goal in the old arena. The 1971 National Champions were honored at halftime.

In 1982, the center court jump circle was replaced. It was later autographed by coach John Wooden and several former Bruins' players including Kareem Abdul-Jabbar and Bill Walton. It was acquired by a private party and consigned to a sports memorabilia auction where it sold May 1, 2011 for $325,085, the most ever paid for a piece of college basketball memorabilia.

Almost every year since its inception, the Nickelodeon Kids' Choice Awards were held inside the arena until the renovations in 2011. It was replaced by Kids Choice Sports Awards in 2014 and been held since then.

Following the completion of the renovation, Pauley Pavilion hosted the NCAA women's gymnastics championships on April 19–21, 2013 and the NCAA men's volleyball championships on May 2 & 4, 2013.

In recent years, the newly renovated Pauley Pavilion has hosted many campus-wide events. In 2013, UCLA's annual Spring Sing organized by the Student Alumni Association was held in this arena. Bruins from all areas of campus performed on stage and truly exemplified the talent and spirit of the UCLA community. The Pediatric Aids Coalition hosts their 26-hour Dance Marathon in Pauley Pavilion as well, which raised $445,019.18 for Pediatric AIDS research in 2014, $446,157.05 in 2015, and $446,253.60 in 2016.

The court was significantly flooded after a 30-inch water main burst on Sunset Boulevard and water started spewing in on July 29, 2014.

On May 1–5, 2018, Pauley Pavilion was the host for the 2018 NCAA Men's National Collegiate Volleyball Tournament. Long Beach State defeated the Bruins in 5 sets to win its second national title since 1991.

Both the 2022 Mountain Pacific Sports Federation Volleyball Tournament and the 2022 NCAA Men's National Collegiate Volleyball Tournament were held at Pauley Pavilion on April 20–23, 2022 and May 1–7, 2022 respectively.

On November 14, 2025, 10,498 fans saw the women's volleyball match between the Bruins and the No. 1 ranked Nebraska Cornhuskers at Pauley Pavilion.

== Renovation ==
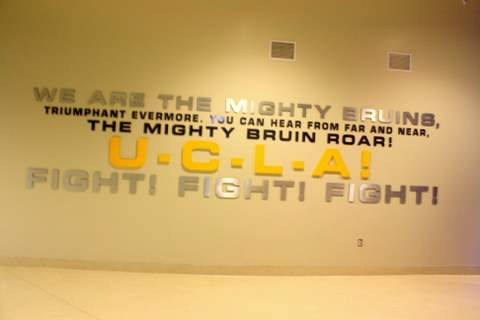
Lyrics to fight song "Mighty Bruins" on display.

As Pauley Pavilion was turning 40 years old, talk intensified about a possible major renovation of the facility. Narrowness of the concourses for spectators to walk around the arena, limited food services and restrooms, the lack of luxury boxes, and a floor configuration that keeps some seating sections distant from the floor have been cited by various observers as areas needing improvement.

According to a 2008 article in the UCLA Daily Bruin, "UCLA initially announced the project Jan. 11, 2007, when it hoped to have construction completed by legendary basketball coach John Wooden’s 100th birthday, Oct. 14, 2010. Since that announcement, the project has moved slowly, as UCLA has sought to raise funds for the project."

The cost of the renovation was once estimated to be $110 million, but now a final estimate will await the development of the architectural plans. The Daily Bruin article also noted "a 2012 completion date is now most likely," with UCLA basketball games having to move off-campus for one year. Exterior work began in 2010, with interior construction following the 2010-2011 basketball season.

The university unveiled the Pauley Pavilion renovation plans to the public and kicked off the fund-raising campaign on May 11, 2009, at Pauley. The groundbreaking ceremony was held a year later on May 11, 2010. By that time, Wooden was in failing health and could not attend; he died three weeks later, at age 99.

The last men's basketball game before Pauley was closed for renovation was UCLA's 71–49 victory over Arizona. The last basket of that game was scored by the Bruins' Tyler Trapani, Coach John Wooden's great-grandson. Controversy emerged due to the newly announced location of the student "den" section. The student section would have been moved from the traditional courtside seats to an area behind the basket. However, after action by alumni and an on-campus student vote, the proposed change was reverted.

After Pauley's closure for renovation, the 2011-12 Bruins men's basketball team played their home games off-campus at the Los Angeles Memorial Sports Arena and the Honda Center. Women's basketball and other Pauley Pavilion teams played at the on-campus John Wooden Center.

Pauley Pavilion was renovated and opened for the UCLA men's basketball season in 2012.

== See also ==
- List of NCAA Division I basketball arenas

== Bibliography ==
- UCLA Men's Basketball Media Guide (PDF copy available at www.uclabruins.com)
- Smale, David (1989). DJ Pauley D Pavilion: College Basketball's Showplace. Manhattan, Kansas: Sports Memories Publishing / Jostens Publishing Company. LCC GV885.43.C34 S63 1989.

| Preceded by Los Angeles Memorial Sports Arena | Home of the UCLA Bruins; 1965 – present | Succeeded by Current |
| Preceded by Meany Hall for the Performing Arts | Host of the Jeopardy! College Championship; 2001 | Succeeded by Jerome Schottenstein Center |
