= Aggie Field Hockey Facility =

Stadium in Davis, California

- Interactive map of Aggie Field Hockey Facility
- Full name: Aggie Field Hockey Facility
- Location: Davis, California
- Coordinates: 38°32′05″N 121°45′35″W
- Owner: University of California, Davis

Construction
- Built: 2014
- Opened: 2014
- Cost: $3.2 million

Tenant
- UC Davis Aggies field hockey

Aggie Field Hockey Facility is a field hockey stadium on the campus of University of California, Davis in Davis, California.

The stadium was constructed in 2014 for the UC Davis field hockey team, which previously played at Aggie Stadium on the UC Davis campus.
