= Big C (fight song) =

Fight song of the University of California, Berkeley

"Big C" is a fight song of the University of California, Berkeley. Composed in 1913 by Harold P. Williams, with lyrics by Norman Loyall McLaren, it commemorates the construction of the large concrete "C" in 1905 on the "rugged Eastern foothills" of the Berkeley campus. The song was the winning entry in the Daily Californian school song competition in 1913. Arrangements of the tune are used by other schools in the University of California system.

== Controversy ==
California's version of "Big C"

UC Davis' version of "Big C"

UCLA's version of "Big C"

Kelly James, then associate director of the UCLA Marching Band and an alumnus of the Cal Band, wrote an arrangement of "Big C" for a halftime show performed by the combined marching bands from UCLA, UC Davis, and Cal. Afterwards, UCLA continued using James' arrangement of "Big C" as its fight song, adding their own lyrics and renaming it "Sons of Westwood." It was soon adopted as UCLA's primary fight song.

Many Cal fans, most notably Cal Band director James Berdahl, were angered by what they perceived as Kelly James' appropriation of their song. A bitter exchange ensued between Berdahl and James for several years concerning the legal and ethical grounds for James' adaptation. Finally, on February 18, 1969, UCLA lawyers were informed by the Copyright Office of the Library of Congress that "Big C" had never been copyrighted, and was therefore in the public domain. However, when Cal plays UCLA and "Sons of Westwood" is played, Cal fans sing a parody ending: "but damn you, it's 'Big C.'" Likewise, when Cal plays "Big C," UCLA plays their signature "tag" at the end, which is a part of "Sons of Westwood" but not "Big C".

Other schools in the University of California system that use the song as one of their official fight songs include the University of California, Riverside, University of California, Santa Barbara, University of California, Irvine, and UC Davis. UC Santa Barbara's version mentions that "Cal Poly's men will soon be routed, and their green will turn to red." UC Davis's version mentions Sacramento State, its rival, singing, "Sac State Sucks! and will be routed. We'll stomp them in the mud and their green will turn to blood." Many high schools in California also use arrangements of the tune, including Vacaville High School, Concord High School, Napa High School, Independence High School, Pittsburg High School in Pittsburg, San Ramon Valley High School in Danville, De La Salle High School in Concord, Poway High School in Poway, River City High School in West Sacramento, Moorpark High School in Moorpark, Benicia High School in Benicia, Gonzales High School in Gonzales, California, Dana Hills High School in Dana Point and Orange High School.

== Lyrics ==
"On the rugged eastern foothills
Stands our symbol clear and bold
Big C means to fight and strive
And win for Blue and Gold
Golden Bear is ever watching
Day by day he prowls
And when he hears the tread
Of lowly Stanford red
From his lair he fiercely growls

Grr-ah! Grr-ah! Grr-rr-rr-ah!

We are sons of California
Fighting for the Gold and Blue
Palms of glory we will win
For Alma Mater true
Stanford's men will soon be routed
By our dazzling "C"
And when we serpentine
Their red will turn to green
In our hour of victory!"

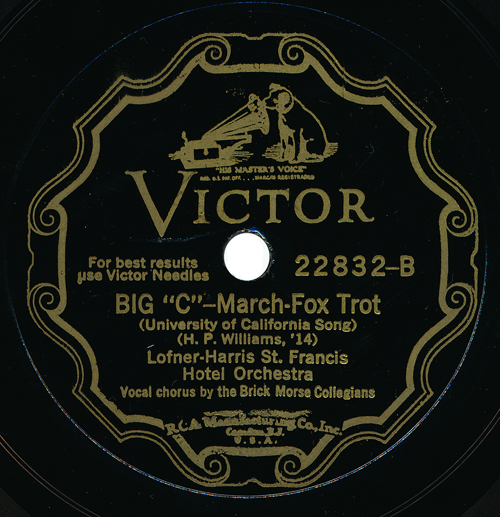
A recording of "Big C"

== Recordings ==
The Loftner-Harris St. Francis Hotel Orchestra recorded the song in October 1931. It has also been recorded on several albums by the Cal Band, including Big C (1976), California, Here's to Thee (1991), and University of California Band (2003).

== See also ==
- "Sons of Westwood"
