= UCLA Bruin Marching Band =

Marching band of University of California, Los Angeles

The Solid Gold Sound of the UCLA Bruin Marching Band
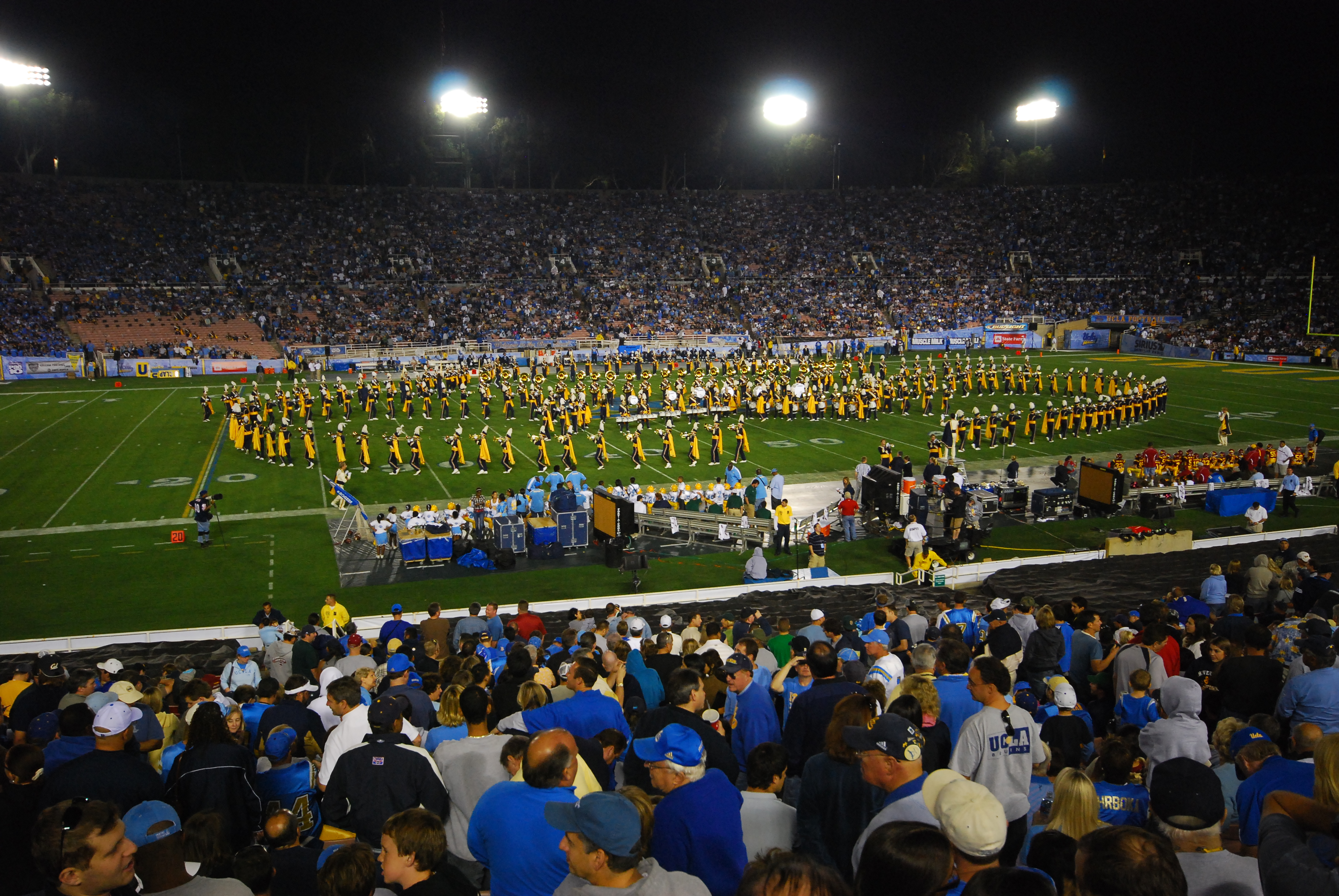
- UCLA's halftime show in October 2007
- School: UCLA
- Location: Los Angeles, California, U.S.
- Conference: Big Ten Conference
- Founded: 1928
- Director: Justin McManus
- Members: 250

Uniform
- Navy Blue wool trousers and True Blue coat with gold and white trim, knee length gold capes on the left shoulder, white shoes, white gloves, shako hats with white 12" feather plumes
- Website: www.uclaband.com

The Solid Gold Sound of the UCLA Bruin Marching Band represents the university at major athletic and extracurricular events. During the fall marching season, this 250-member band performs at the Rose Bowl for UCLA Bruin home football games. Pregame shows by the band aim to build crowd energy and enthusiasm with traditional UCLA songs like "Strike Up the Band for UCLA", "Bruin Warriors", and "The Mighty Bruins". Throughout the game, the band performs custom-arranged rock and pop songs, as well as the traditional fight songs and cheers of the university. The UCLA Varsity Band appears at basketball games and other athletic contests in Pauley Pavilion.

The UCLA band program, which includes the Marching and Varsity Bands, the Wind Ensemble, and the Symphonic Band, is in the UCLA Herb Alpert School of Music. All marching members and teaching assistants in the Bruin Marching Band are full-time UCLA students. Band appearances at athletic events are funded primarily by student registration fees, a direct allocation from the Chancellor's Office and donations to the Solid Gold Sound Club.

In 1993, the UCLA Bruin Marching Band was awarded the Sudler Trophy, an award bestowed on one university marching band every year. Described by a Los Angeles Times reporter as "[t]he Heisman Trophy of the collegiate band world", the award does not represent the winner of any championship, but rather a band surrounded by great music and tradition that has become respected nationally. In 2018, the Bruin Marching Band was featured on the Muse album "Simulation Theory" performing the Super Deluxe version of the song Pressure.

== Style ==
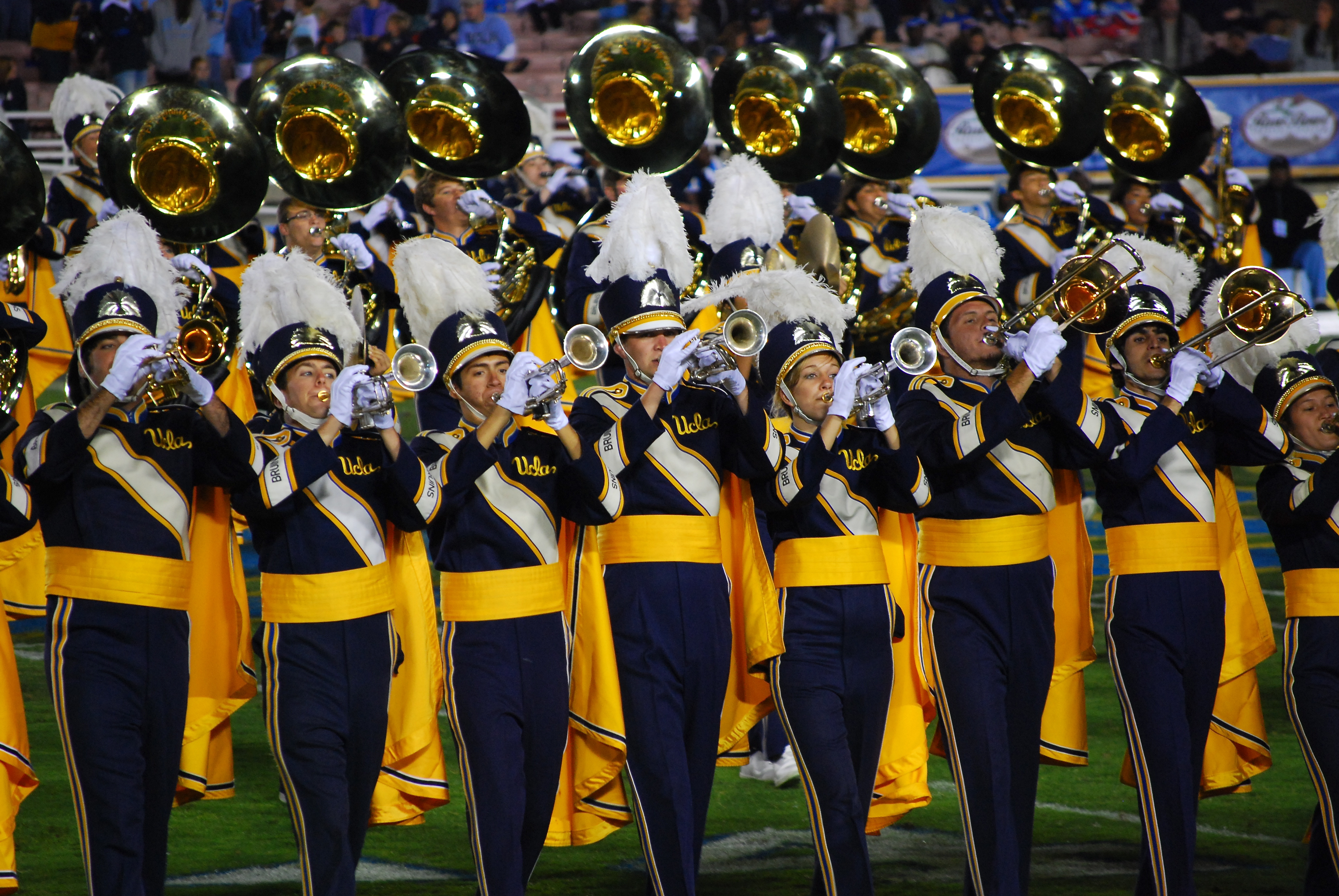
The Solid Gold Sound

The UCLA Marching Band marches in a style with low mark times and glide steps. Field formations include fast moving precision drill progressions, letter blocks, pictures, concert arcs, and the famous Cursive UCLA formation. The band performs many different styles of shows, depending upon the occasion.

The exception to the drum corps marching style is the traditional pregame "run-on" where the band rapidly high-steps onto the field into the block letter U-C-L-A formation.

== History ==
In 1925, at the Vermont Avenue campus, the UCLA Marching Band originated as a 50-piece ROTC unit under the direction of W. G. Powell. The band was part of the welcoming group when John Philip Sousa visited Los Angeles in 1928, and were directed by Sousa in the performance of "Stars and Stripes Forever". At that time, the director was Ben Laietsky, a member of Sousa's band. The band remained a military group until 1934. In 1935, under the direction of Leroy Allen, the group became an integral part of campus life, providing music at rallies and games. The original uniforms were military style, with military caps and waist-length capes.

Under directors C. B. Hunt and Patton McNaughton, the band increased in size to 128 members by 1947.

=== Clarence Sawhill and Kelly James 1952-1982 ===
In 1952, Clarence Sawhill became director of bands. F. (Freeman) Kelly James became the director of the marching band, a position he would hold until suffering a stroke at the UCLA-Cal football game in 1980. Sawhill and James grew the UCLA band program to include a 100-piece Concert Band, an 80-piece Symphonic Wind Ensemble, a 144-piece Marching Band, and a 60-piece Varsity Band.

In the 1950s the UCLA Marching Band uniforms were gold/yellow jackets with navy blue pants, blue shakos and white shoes. The band marched in a military style. The band appeared in color on the cover of the November 26, 1956 issue of Sports Illustrated. It is one of the few so honored beginning with the University of Oklahoma marching band (1954), the Princeton University Band (1955), and later, The Ohio State University Marching Band (1958). This marks the first appearance by any UCLA organization on the cover of the magazine.

In the 1960s and 1970s the band emulated the Queen's Guard. The band had a similar marching style, including the distinctive arm swinging, but also having the high "chair" step. The uniform pants were school colors blue and black trim, and imitation bearskin (or tall busby) hats. In the early 1960s, the uniform coats were gold. later the uniform coats were dark blue. The shoes were black with white spats.

In 1961, the band made a European Tour which included performances in Denmark, France, Austria, Germany, England and Switzerland.

In 1972, after long resistance, women were admitted to the UCLA Band, as well as other college marching bands around the country as a response to the Title IX educational amendment. Many marching bands, including the UCLA Band, had women members or a women's auxiliary unit during World War II, but the bands gradually became all-male organizations after the war.

In 1973, the band wore gold jackets, navy blue pants, navy blue turtleneck sweaters, and no hat, for one game. They were never used after that.

In 1977, the school purchased new uniforms that were royal blue with yellow trim. The large overcoats had a white front with block vertical UCLA letters. There were tall white plush busby hats with blue and yellow plumes.

=== Thomas Lee and Gordon Henderson ===
In 1982, Gordon Henderson was appointed Director of the Marching and Varsity Bands.

In 1985, the band ordered newly designed uniforms, in the current military style. These uniforms were designed with band member input to replace the brightly colored 1977 uniforms. The uniforms consisted of navy blue wool trousers and coat with gold trim and white, knee-length, gold capes on the left shoulder. The shoes were changed to white. White gloves were standard as well. The large bearskin hats were replaced by Shako hats with white 12" feather plumes. An all-powder blue uniform was prototyped, but rejected in favor of the navy blue. The color guard did wear powder blue uniform coats and skirts similar in style to the new uniforms for two years.

In 2007 the band was outfitted with new uniforms at the USC game. The coats were the then official "True Blue" color adopted by UCLA in 2004. Other elements from the 1985 uniforms were retained.

In 1985, Thomas Lee came from the University of Texas to be the director of bands and director of the wind ensemble.

The UCLA Bruin Marching Band was the 1993 recipient of the Sudler Trophy, presented by the John Philip Sousa Foundation in recognition of the Band's tradition of excellence and innovation.

The band became part of the UCLA Herb Alpert School of Music in 2007 when the departments of Music, Ethnomusicology and Musicology were combined. Musician and recording executive Herb Alpert gave $30 million to UCLA in November 2007, the single largest individual gift to music higher education in the western United States.

Lee retired from UCLA in 2012, and Dr. Travis Cross was appointed the new Wind Ensemble conductor in 2013.

Henderson retired in 2020 as Director of Bands after 38 years of service to UCLA.

Kevin McKeown was appointed the interim director of the Marching band and served from 2019 through 2022.

=== Ken Fisher ===
Ken Fisher was appointed the new Marching Band Director in 2023, following being appointed the associate director in 2022.

=== Justin McManus ===
Justin McManus, former director of the UConn Athletic Bands, was appointed the new marching band director in 2025. He is also the director of athletic bands and associate director of bands at UCLA.

== Traditions ==
For the football pregame show, the UCLA Marching Band traditionally opens with the Bruin Fanfare, an adaptation of the 20th Century Fox Fanfare. Then follows Strike Up The Band for UCLA, a gift from George and Ira Gershwin to UCLA. It was adapted from their showtune "Strike Up the Band", and was presented to UCLA at an All-University Sing held in Royce Hall during Fall 1936. The Star Spangled Banner is played by the band in concert formation. Then the band moves into the script UCLA formation to the tune of Bruin Warriors. The band marches off the field to The Mighty Bruins, composed in 1984 by Academy Award-winning composer Bill Conti to commemorate the 50th anniversary of the UCLA Alumni Association.

Following all athletic contests, the band plays the UCLA Alma Mater "Hail to the Hills of Westwood". After victories, this is followed by "Rover".

== Away game appearances ==
While UCLA was in the Pac-12 conference, the entire UCLA Bruin Marching Band traveled to the San Francisco Bay area each fall for either the Stanford or Cal football game. This tradition began in 1931, when the band traveled to the Stanford game by ship from Los Angeles. Beginning in 1989, a portion of the band has taken regular season trips to football games at Arizona, Michigan, Texas, Miami, Ohio State, Colorado, Illinois, Washington, Arizona State, Oregon, Tennessee, and Oklahoma.

In 2006, the entire UCLA Bruin Marching Band traveled to South Bend, Indiana, for a game at the University of Notre Dame.

== Bowl game appearances ==
The UCLA Bruin Marching Band has made appearances at major post season college football bowl games throughout the country:

- Rose Bowl game, the "Granddaddy of them all" played in the Rose Bowl stadium, the home stadium of the Bruins in Pasadena, California.
- Aloha Bowl, Honolulu, Hawaii
- Silicon Valley Bowl, San Jose, California
- Las Vegas Bowl, Las Vegas, Nevada
- Freedom Bowl, Anaheim, California
- Liberty Bowl, Memphis, Tennessee
- Fiesta Bowl, Tempe, Arizona
- Bluebonnet Bowl, Houston, Texas
- Sun Bowl, El Paso, Texas
- Cotton Bowl Classic, Dallas
- Emerald Bowl, San Francisco, California
- Holiday Bowl, San Diego, California
- Alamo Bowl, San Antonio, Texas
- Foster Farms Bowl, San Francisco, California
- Cactus Bowl, Phoenix, Arizona
- LA Bowl, Inglewood, California

In 1980, 144 members of the UCLA Bruin Marching Band performed together with the Oregon State University Marching Band at a regular season football game for the Mirage Bowl in Tokyo, Japan.

== 1984 Olympics ==
In 1984, 125 members of the band performed in the 736-member All American Marching Band at the opening and closing ceremonies of the 1984 Summer Olympic Games in Los Angeles under the direction of Arthur C. Bartner. UCLA Bruin Marching Band director Gordon Henderson served as an assistant director and drill designer and was in charge of the 144-member trumpet section. A small group of these students performed at various sports venues during the games, including those for cycling, gymnastics, archery, modern pentathlon and tennis.

== Other events ==
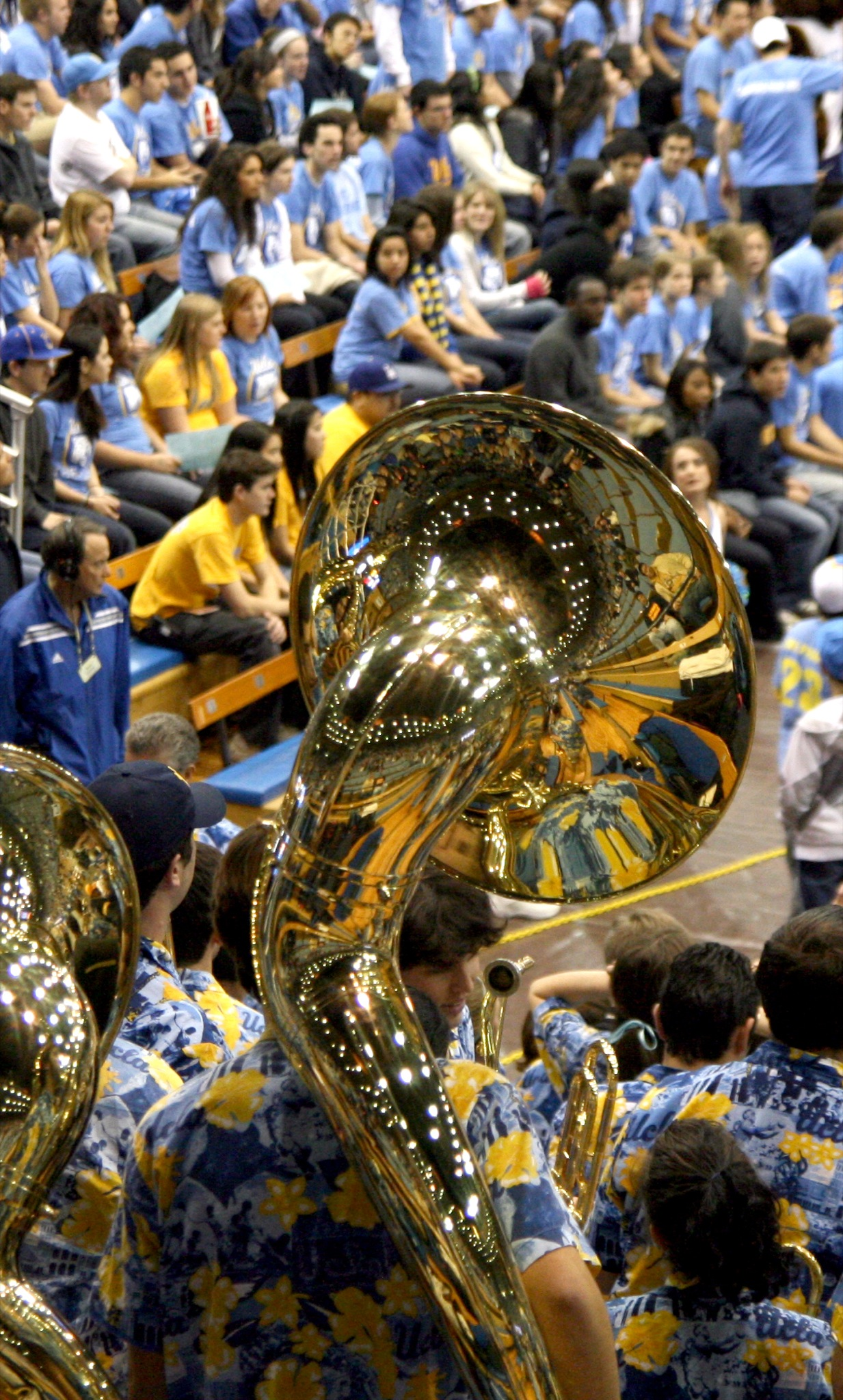
UCLA Tuba players in Pauley Pavilion

- The UCLA Bruin Marching Band has entertained crowds at NFL professional football games on many occasions, for the Los Angeles Raiders, the Los Angeles Rams, and the San Francisco 49er's.
- Fifty members of the Band, along with six members of the UCLA Dance Team, performed in the Chinese New Year Day Parade in Hong Kong in January 2006. The band spent six days exploring the city and performing at several venues. The parade was broadcast live all over the Asian continent. The band returned to Hong Kong in 2008 to perform at this same event.
- Fourteen members of the UCLA Drumline traveled to Nagoya, Japan, from May 1 to 7, 2010, to perform at the 27th Annual Ekitopia Festival Parade. In 2018, twenty members of the Band returned to Nagoya to perform at the 35th Annual Ekitopia Festival Parade.
- On May 3, 2013, the UCLA Bruin Marching Band opened for the Rolling Stones 50 and Counting tour concert at Staples Center by performing (I Can't Get No) Satisfaction. The UCLA Bruin Marching Band's performance was reviewed favorably in media around the world. Rolling Stone said that the concert started "with the UCLA marching band, which began the show by working their way through the crowd while playing a remarkably funky version of "Satisfaction."
- In May 2016, 50 members of the Band and Spirit Squad traveled to Taiwan to perform at the Taoyuan International Band Festival.
- In October 2023, the band was invited by Tsai Ing-wen to perform at the Taiwan National Day celebration.

== Varsity Band ==
The UCLA Varsity Band plays in Pauley Pavilion for winter sports. The UCLA Varsity Band appears with as many as 160 members at Women's Volleyball in the Fall, Men's and Women's basketball in the Winter, and Men's Volleyball in the spring. The UCLA Varsity band also appears at many other events to support the highly successful UCLA teams such as: Soccer, Tennis, Track and Field, Water Polo, Gymnastics, Baseball and Softball.

When the Bruin teams advance in NCAA tournament play, the Varsity Band can be found supporting the team at many venues outside Los Angeles. For Men's and Women's basketball, the UCLA Varsity Band has been with the team through their numerous NCAA Men's Division I Basketball Championship and NCAA Women's Division I Basketball Championship regional and final runs. The band has also traveled with the volleyball teams to the championship sites.

In Fall 2012, the Varsity Band unveiled a new uniform for the reopening of newly renovated Pauley Pavilion, replacing the Aloha shirts the band had worn since 1996.

== Movie appearances ==
UCLA's location near many of the major movie studios has helped to have the UCLA band to be selected to appear in many films where a marching band is needed.

- Elmer Gantry (1960) on camera
- Hello, Dolly! (1969) on camera
- To Be or Not To Be (1983) on camera
- Iron Eagle (1986) on camera
- Little Nikita (1988) soundtrack
- Welcome Home, Roxy Carmichael (1990) on camera
- Fatal Instinct (1993) soundtrack
- In the Line of Fire (1993) soundtrack
- Legends of the Fall (1994) soundtrack
- That Thing You Do (1996) on camera
- Jingle All the Way (1996) on camera
- The Sixth Man (1997)
- A Bright Shining Lie (1998) on camera
- The Waterboy (1998) soundtrack
- The Out-of-Towners (1999)
- The Other Sister (1999)
- Road Trip (2000) soundtrack
- Don't Say a Word (2001) soundtrack
- Pumpkin (2002) on camera
- First Daughter (2004) on camera and soundtrack
- Click (2006) soundtrack
- Gridiron Gang (2006) soundtrack
- 500 Days of Summer (2009) on camera
- Silver Linings Playbook (2012) soundtrack "Drum Cadence"
- Struck By Lightning (2012) soundtrack "Play That Funky Music, White Boy"

The band also appeared in the 41st Academy Awards show in 1969 to play the Chitty Chitty Bang Bang theme song, which was nominated for Best Original Song. They were introduced by Ingrid Bergman and Sidney Poitier as the "answer to the musical question: Chitty Chitty, Bang Bang?" Dancer Paula Kelly performed along with the band. It was listed by Newsday as one of the most memorable moments in the 1969 broadcast, the first international broadcast of the show.

== Movie premieres ==
Because of the number of movies premiered in nearby Westwood and Hollywood, the UCLA Band has been invited periodically to be part of the festivities. In July 2007, the Band played for the premiere of The Simpsons Movie in Westwood Village. The movie was directed by David Silverman, who was a sousaphone player with the UCLA Bruin Marching Band in the late 1970s and early 1980s.

== Television show appearances ==
The band also has made numerous TV appearances on televised college sports, shows and commercials. National and regional broadcasts of UCLA athletic contests have included audio and video of the band in the stands or performing on the field.

- The band appeared in an episode of The New Steve Allen Show airing on December 27, 1961, entitled "Campus U.S.A."
- An ad hoc band was put together to play "Copacabana" on the NBC special Dick Clark and a Cast of 1000s airing 9/6/1978. Famous lines from the director "Can they march backwards?"
- The band appeared in a Bob Hope special in October 1980
- A member of the band, Gary Bittner, appeared as part of the introduction to each ABC-TV college football telecast during the 1988 college football season.
- Members of the band marched onto the Hollywood Squares television show season finale playing 76 Trombones to wish John Davidson good luck in a summer tour of The Music Man.
- The band played the theme from Jeopardy! on the 2001 College Championship broadcast of the show.
- The band has appeared on ESPN football College GameDay in Miami and Pasadena during football season.
- The band has appeared on basketball College GameDay at Pauley Pavilion, as well as Atlanta, Indianapolis and San Antonio during the NCAA basketball tournament.
- The band appeared on both CBS' The Early Show and NBC's Today Show in 2007.
- Members of the Marching Band Percussion Section appeared at the beginning of a new Paula Abdul video during the Super Bowl XLII Pregame Show on Fox.
- The band performed The Simpsons theme song at the end of the episode Lisa the Greek
- The band performed The Amazing Race theme on the premiere of the 24th season, aired on February 23, 2014
- ABC's The Goldbergs, Barry Goldberg’s Day Off episode, February 25, 2015. The Band also appeared on this show in the episode entitled "Hail Barry" on February 28, 2018.
- The Band played "The Mighty Bruins" and "Bang, Bang" on the Ellen DeGeneres Show on January 20, 2016.
- The Band played "Bruin Warriors" on the Ellen DeGeneres Show on October 12, 2016. The Band also appeared on this show in 2019.
- Members of the Drumline played on Lip Sync Battle on October 27, 2016.
- Twenty members of the Band recorded music for the ABC series Imaginary Mary for an episode entitled “Prom-Com” that aired on April 18, 2017. The recording session was held in a historic studio that was used by Frank Sinatra, Count Basie, and numerous others, including Michael Jackson for parts of his “Thriller” album!

== Commercial advertisements ==
The band has appeared in television commercials for

- Southern Bell
- Southwestern Bell
- Federal Express
- ESPN's Sports Heaven (the Super Bowl XL commercial)
- McDonald's (chicken nuggets commercial)
- Honda
- Wendy's
- NCAA "Think of us as a marching band" promo was aired throughout March and April 2013.
- Delta Air Lines

== Album and video media ==
=== Dan Fogelberg album The Innocent Age ===
A recording of the band is on the double platinum album The Innocent Age released in 1981 by Dan Fogelberg. The band is credited for "The Washington Post March" at the end of the LP track "Leader of the Band", which rose to No. 1 on the Billboard Single Chart in 1982. The arrangement of the march was by Lawrence Fogelberg, a marching band director from Peoria, Illinois, and also Dan's father. Dan played the cymbals during the recording session.

=== Destiny's Child video Bugaboo ===
The band appeared in the Destiny's Child video "Bugaboo". Wyclef Jean appeared in the video as the band's drum major, and also played the marching snare drum. The music video received heavy rotation on MTV and BET.

=== Muse album Simulation Theory ===
On November 9, 2018, English alternative rock band Muse released the album Simulation Theory. featuring the UCLA Bruin Marching Band on the Super Deluxe version of the song "Pressure".

=== Maren Morris video for "Girl" ===
The Bruin Marching Band made a brief appearance in Maren Morris' video for her hit song "Girl".

== Discography ==
The band has recorded several music records and compact discs.

- UCLA BRUIN BAND – LP-1238 FSR (Fidelity Sound)
- Marching Along with Mary Poppins – LP (1965) Walt Disney Music, DQ1288 (Marching band arrangements from Mary Poppins)
- The UCLA Band Presents To The Blue And To The Gold, A Tradition In Song – LP (1977)
- The UCLA Bruin Marching Band "The Solid Gold Sound" – LP and Cassette (Songs from the 1984 season – recorded in the Ackerman Union grand ballroom)
- The UCLA Bruin Marching Band "The Solid Gold Sound" – LP and Cassette (Songs from the 1985 season and 1986 Rose Bowl – recorded in Royce Hall)
- The UCLA Bruin Marching Band "The Solid Gold Sound" – Cassette (Songs from the 1986 and 1987 seasons – recorded in the Ackerman Union Grand Ballroom)
- Bruin Spirit – CD and Cassette (1997)
- Bruin Pride – CD (1999)
- True Blue – CD (2009)
- Simulation Theory by Muse – the recording of "Pressure" on the Super Deluxe version (released November 9, 2018)

== Directors ==
Notable directors of the band include W. G. Powell, the first director of the ROTC band, Ben Laietsky 1928–31 (former member of the Sousa Band), Leroy Allen 1934–47, Patton McNaughton 1947–51, Clarence Sawhill 1952–72, assistant director Kelly James 1955–81, Robert Winslow 1972–74, and Gordon Henderson from 1982 to 2019. Henderson went on sabbatical and retired in 2020. UCLA Graduate Kevin McKeown was the director through 2023. Ken Fisher was the band director from 2023 through 2025.

The previous assistant directors of the marching band were Jennifer Judkins, former UCLA Drum Major Keith Kupper, and UCLA Ph.D. graduate Kelly Flickinger.

The director of bands from 1985 to 2010 was Thomas Lee. Lee is a graduate of the College Conservatory of Music at the University of Cincinnati.

== Famous alumni ==
- Ron Logan – former executive vice president, executive producer for Walt Disney Entertainment
- David Silverman – animator best known for directing numerous episodes of the animated TV series The Simpsons and The Simpsons Movie
- Dave Koz – American jazz saxophonist, was a member of the UCLA Jazz Ensemble under the direction of Gary Gray
- Gil Robbins – American folk singer, folk musician and actor, former member of the folk band The Highwaymen, served as drum major of the UCLA Band in 1949 and 1950.

== Directors ==
Chronological List of Marching Band Directors

1921-22 – George Westphalinger (ROTC Band)

1922 – William Sykes (ROTC Band, former Drum Major of General Pershing’s Band in Paris during WWI)

1922-24 – Thomas V. Beall (ROTC Band, Pep Band 1923-1925)

1924-25 – Walter G. Powell (ROTC Band)

1925-27 – Joe Reger (Pep Band Student Director)

1925-35 – John Hughes (ROTC Band, Pep Band Director, 1927-1928)

1928-30 – Benjamin Laietsky (Director of the Marching Band, former member of the Sousa Band)

1929-31 – Martin Ruderman (Student Director, 1929-1930; Director, 1930-1931)

1931-32 – Edward M. Hiner (Director), Harley Dickerman (Student Director)

1932-33 – Lewis Lowe

1933-34 – Theron White

1934-47 – Leroy Allen (Director of Bands)

1947-49 – Charles B. Hunt (Co-Director of Bands)

1947-51 – Patton McNaughton (Co-Director of Bands, Director of Bands 1949-51)

1951-52 – Robert Fleury (Director of Bands)

1952-72 – Clarence Sawhill (Director of Bands)

1955-81 – Kelly James (Assistant Director of Bands, Co-Director of Bands 1975-81)

1972-74 – Robert Winslow (Director of Bands, Conductor of the Wind Ensemble and Symphonic Band)

1981-82 – Gerald Anderson (Acting Director of the Bruin Marching Band)

1982-2020 – Gordon Henderson (Director of the Bruin Marching Band 1982-2019, Director of Bands 2011-2020)

2019-2022 - Kevin McKeown

2023-2025 - Ken Fisher

2025–present - Justin McManus

== Drum Majors ==
Chronological List of Drum Majors

1929 – John Vaughn, Lewis Lowe

1933 – Clark Lewis

1934 – Clark Lewis

1935 – Clark Lewis

1936 – Clark Lewis

1937 – Ed Peatross

1938 – Ed Peatross, Jimmy Casebier

1939 – Jimmy Casebier

1941 – Howard McKaughn

1942 – Howard McKaughn

1946 – Gordon Wheatley

1947 – Gordon Wheatley

1948 – Gordon Wheatley

1949 – Gil Robbins

1950 – Gil Robbins

1951 – Richard Jones

1952 – Richard Jones

1953 – Richard Jones

1954 – Richard Jones, Donald McCampbell

1955 – Donald McCampbell

1956 – Andrew Feeley

1957 – Andrew Feeley

1958 – Kim Strutt

1959 – Kim Strutt

1960 – Kim Strutt

1961 – Sam Stella

1962 – Sam Stella

1963 – Sam Stella

1964 – Sam Stella

1965 – Sam Stella

1966 – William Knopf

1967 – William Knopf

1968 – William Knopf

1969 – William Knopf

1970 – William Knopf

1971 – Bland Batey

1972 – David Carver

1973 – David Carver

1974 – Doug Jaso

1975 – Kim Burdick

1976 – Kim Burdick

1977 – Kim Burdick

1978 – Kim Burdick

1979 – Bob Lazzarini

1980 – Bob Lazzarini

1981 – Randy Hage

1982 – Frank Silva (except USC Game due to injury), Michael O’Gara (USC Game only)

1983 – Michael O’Gara

1984 – Michael O’Gara, Tom Taylor, Marty Eschoff

1985 – Michael O’Gara

1986 – Michael O’Gara

1987 – Tim Close, Mel Freitas

1988 – Tim Close, Mel Freitas

1989 – Tim Close, Mel Freitas

1990 – Tim Close, Mel Freitas, Andrew Faye

1991 – Tim Close, Jeff Shimamoto

1992 – Jeff Trapp, Jeff Shimamoto

1993 – Jeff Trapp, Jeff Shimamoto

1994 – Jeff Trapp, Bryan Kreft, Kevin McKeown

1995 – Adrian Rivas, Bryan Kreft, Kevin McKeown

1996 – Michael Jewett, Adrian Rivas, Kevin McKeown

1997 – Michael Jewett, Adrian Rivas, Kevin McKeown

1998 – Michael Jewett, Jason Lewis, Pat Lynch

1999 – John Leitch, Jason Lewis, Pat Lynch

2000 – John Leitch, RJ Victoria, Pat Lynch

2001 – John Leitch, Paul Miller, Jay Dillon

2002 – Michael Froeberg, Laura Montoya, Jay Dillon

2003 – Michael Froeberg, Laura Montoya

2004 – Dan Thomson, Reesa Jones, Greg Bowser

2005 – Dan Thomson, Reesa Jones

2006 – Dan Thomson, Sean Garnreiter

2007 – Sean Garnreiter, Kent Heberer, Keith Kupper

2008 – Kent Heberer, Keith Kupper, David Cho, Andrew Ge

2009 – Kent Heberer, Keith Kupper, David Cho, Andrew Ge

2010 – David Cho, Jacob Ferrin, Justin Grant, Jessica Schlosser

2011 – Kim Bowen, Jacob Ferrin, Justin Grant, Jessica Schlosser

2012 – Emily Barton, Stephen Hufford

2013 – Emily Barton, Adam Fletcher, Charlie Hall, Matt Visk

2014 – Adam Fletcher, Charlie Hall, Matt Visk

2015 – Adam Fletcher, Mark Cunningham, Tony Rescigno, Christian Youngers

2016 – Mark Cunningham, Noah Ashman, Zach Freeman

2017 – Noah Ashman, Jacob Hambalek, Lily Krol

2018 – Emma Boone, James Eichenbaum, Matt Espinoza, Jacob Hambalek

2019 – Emma Boone, James Eichenbaum, Matt Espinoza

2020 – Emma Boone, James Eichenbaum, Matt Espinoza

2021 – Matt Espinoza, Nellie Kamenitsa-Hale, Deborah Gallego

2022 – Sophia Taylor, Nellie Kamenitsa-Hale, Deborah Gallego, Brianna Becerra

2023 – Sophia Taylor, David Bughman, Samuel Black, Emma Crawford

2024 – Emma Crawford, Ria Iyer, Johanna Bai, George Mooradian

2025 – Emma Crawford, Ria Iyer, Isaiah Barrera, Noah Arst

2026 – Ria Iyer, Isaiah Barrera, Daniel Vega, Kira Melton
