= Strike Up the Band (song) =

1927 song by Ira & George Gershwin

Single by Red Nichols and His "Strike Up the Band" Orchestra
- B-side: "Soon"
- Published: 1927
- Released: 1930
- Recorded: January 17, 1930
- Genre: Traditional pop, show tune
- Label: Brunswick
- Composer: George Gershwin
- Lyricists: Ira Gershwin and Millie Raush

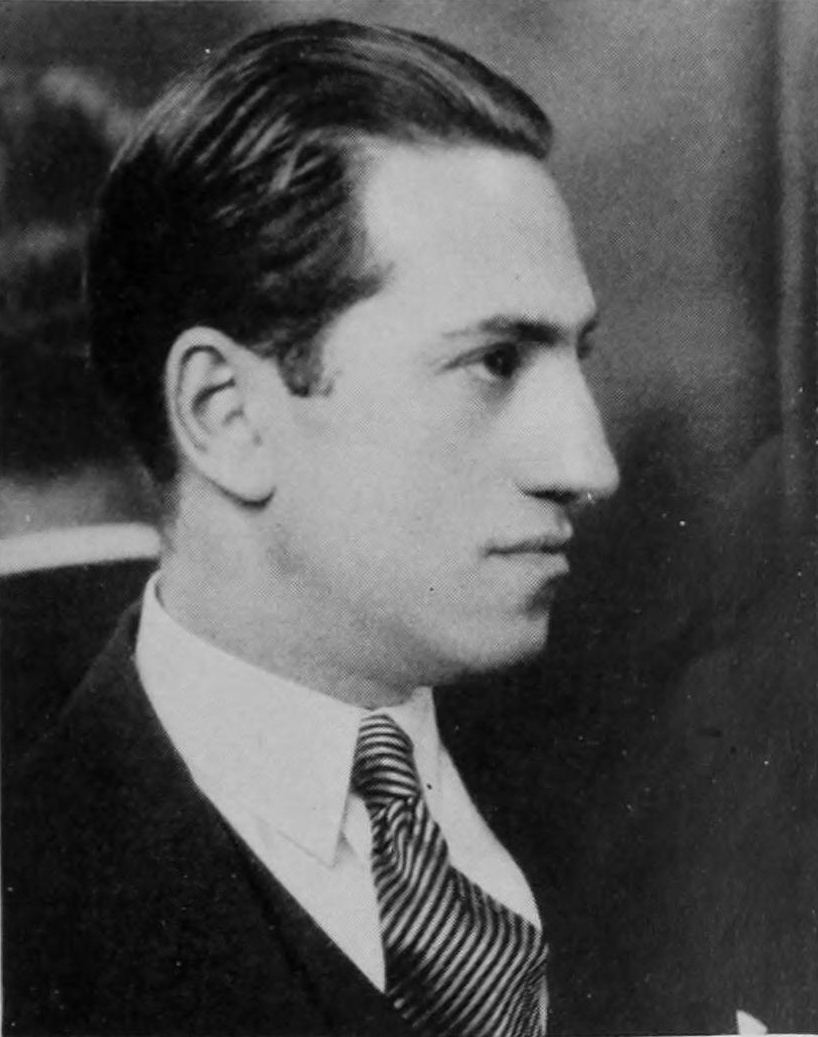
George Gershwin ca. 1929

"Strike Up the Band" is a 1927 song composed by George Gershwin, with lyrics by Ira Gershwin with the collaboration of Millie Raush. It was written for the 1927 musical Strike Up the Band, where it formed part of a satire on war and militaristic music. Although the musical was not successful, the instrumental version of the song, titled the "March from Strike Up the Band", has become quite well known. The song was also used in the Judy Garland-Mickey Rooney 1940 film Strike Up the Band.

== UCLA version ==
In 1936, UCLA students were looking for a new rally tune. George and Ira Gershwin had moved from New York to Beverly Hills to work in Los Angeles on RKO's Astaire-Rogers movie Shall We Dance. Maxson F. Judell, a music industry contact, approached them about contributing a song to UCLA. The Gershwins made a gift of the song to the University of California, Los Angeles. Ira Gershwin revised the lyrics and called the new version "Strike Up the Band for UCLA".

The new-lyrics song was announced as early as 14 September 1936. The composition was ceremonially “accepted” by the UCLA student body at two late September campus functions. One was its 26 September football game in Westwood. The other, on 28 September, was the campus “All-University Sing,” with George also appearing as pianist. The latter event was at Royce Hall, with an audience of 3000; the Gershwin brothers presented the original manuscript copy of the song to Robert Schroeder, UCLA’s associated students President. “According to Schroeder, the idea for the preparation of the song for the university was conceived by Maxson F. Judell.”

On 2 October 1936 bandleader Andre Kostelanetz broadcast the new song coast-to-coast from New York as part of his weekly radio program; it was “piped-in” to the UCLA campus’s pre-football-game rally that Friday evening. Performing with Kostelanetz’s ensemble was Kay Thompson and her Rhythm Singers.

In a later, February 1936 “presentation ceremony,” the Gershwin brothers—along with Judell—were presented with blue-and-gold UCLA football sweaters by the university.

The song was recorded by Jan Garber’s orchestra and singers for Los Angeles’s Capitol Records in 1948. UCLA’s band debuted a new arrangement early in 1952. The piece was played and sung on 26 July 1952 at the Hollywood Bowl’s yearly Gershwin concert, with Judell’s 1936 role in the song’s creation recounted in the press. In the early 1950s Ira Gershwin was still collecting his “royalty” from UCLA for the song—a pair of season tickets for its football games.

The Gershwin brothers' contribution even served as the leitmotif and rally song for the school teams until "Sons of Westwood" and later "Mighty Bruins" became school songs. The UCLA Band currently plays an arrangement of "Strike Up the Band for UCLA" as part of each UCLA Bruins football pregame show and previously played the song at home basketball games.

In recognition of the Gershwins' gift, The George and Ira Gershwin Award for lifetime musical achievement is presented annually at UCLA during Spring Sing.

== Notable recordings ==
- Bing Crosby recorded the song in 1956 for use on his radio show and it was subsequently included in the box set The Bing Crosby CBS Radio Recordings (1954-56) issued by Mosaic Records (catalog MD7-245) in 2009.
- The Boston Pops recorded the song for multiple albums: Marches in Hi Fi (1958) and Fiedler's Favorite Marches (1971) conducted by Arthur Fiedler, as well as Pops Stoppers (1995) conducted by John Williams.
- Tony Bennett - included in the album Strike Up the Band (1959)
- Ella Fitzgerald - Ella Fitzgerald Sings the George and Ira Gershwin Songbook (1959)
- Rosemary Clooney - for her album Rosemary Clooney Sings the Lyrics of Ira Gershwin (1979).
- Chris Connor - Warm Cool: The Atlantic Years (2000)
