= UCLA Spring Sing =

Annual singing competition at UCLA

Spring Sing
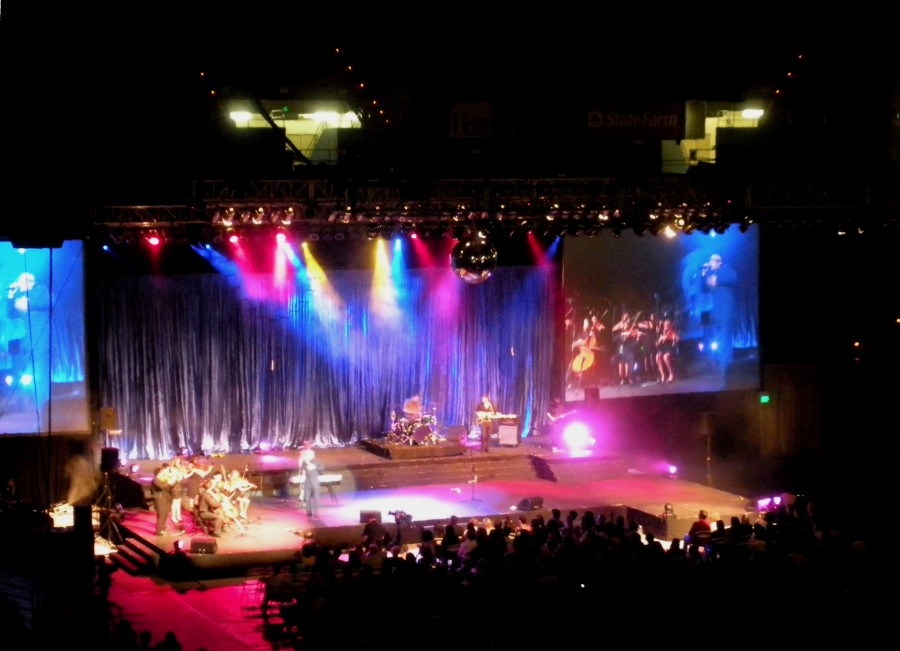
- Spring Sing 2009 at UCLA
- Abbreviation: SS
- Formation: 1945
- Type: Student-operated
- Purpose: To unite the UCLA community by promoting artistic talent
- Headquarters: UCLA
- Location(s): Los Angeles Tennis Center Pauley Pavilion Westwood, Los Angeles, California Royce Hall
- Region served: Greater UCLA community
- Executive Directors: Laura de Beer, Alec Tashima
- Affiliations: UCLA Alumni Association
- Website: alumni.ucla.edu/events/spring-sing/2013 www.youtube.com/user/UCLASpringSing

Spring Sing is an annual music competition held in May at UCLA's Pauley Pavilion. Touted as "UCLA's oldest and greatest musical tradition," the competition brings together UCLA students to perform as solo artists, duets, bands, and a cappella groups in front of an audience of over 8,000 UCLA students, alumni, faculty, staff and celebrity judges.

== History ==
The competition began with only 11 groups and was performed on campus at UCLA's Royce Hall. In the beginning years, the competition was composed mainly of sorority singing groups, serenading their fraternity counterparts. The first of these groups to win the competition was a barbershop trio from the Phi Kappa Psi fraternity. During the 1940s, 1950s, and 1960s, the competition grew quickly and outgrew Royce Hall. It was then, that Spring Sing gained its popularity and notoriety within the Los Angeles and Orange County area, as it moved to the Hollywood Bowl. During these years, up to 5,000 Bruins, family, friends, and locals witnessed the competition each year. Also added to the mix were celebrity judges and masters of ceremonies - including Ronald Reagan in 1952. The competition peaked in the late 60s and took an eight-year hiatus during the 70s until student and alumni interest revived the event (on campus this time) in 1978. The first group to win in 1978 was the combined efforts of Sigma Kappa sorority and Alpha Tau Omega fraternity performing a 50's inspired spoof of fraternity and sorority life. In 1986, the UCLA Student Alumni Association took over the event and moved the event to the Los Angeles Tennis Center in 1989, eventually returning the competition back to its previous glory.

== Today ==
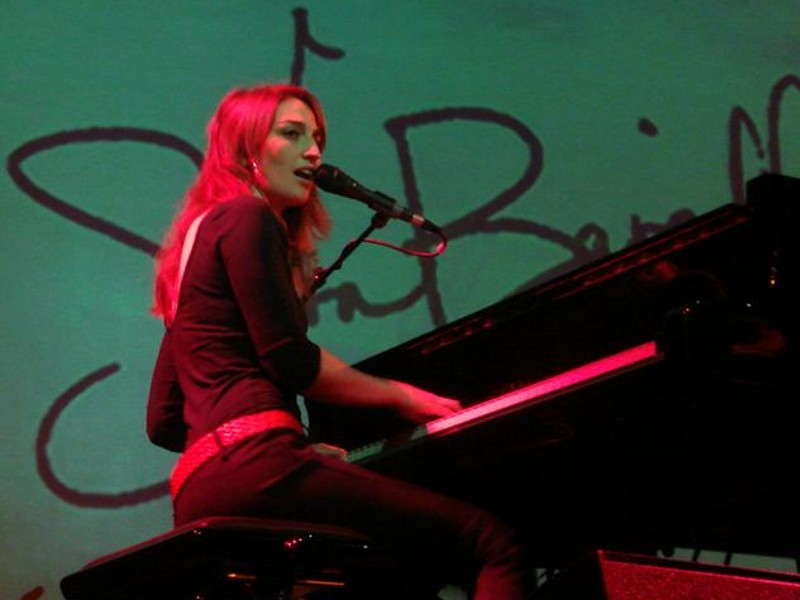
Sara Bareilles '03 performing in 2008

Today, the competition has expanded from its original version of fraternity singing groups, to over 15 artists grouped in 6 different categories (Solo, Duet, A Cappella, Band, Production, Exhibition). Each category (save Exhibition) is judged and a winner is selected for each (from which an overall winner is chosen to receive the "Northern California Alumni Grand Sweepstakes Award").

In addition to the talent aspect of Spring Sing today, the overall production has been turned into entertainment with the inception of the Company - a group of UCLA students who perform skits, songs and parodies in between each act as a way of introducing the next act. According to their website, they are "a group of the most hilarious and creative people on this campus who live for the spotlight and the opportunity to make an audience crack up."

Past performers from Spring Sing include: Grammy nominated members of Maroon 5, who were defeated in 2000 by Barely Manilow, Tyrone Wells, and the Grammy Award winner Sara Bareilles. Bareilles won Spring Sing twice, in 2002 and 2003. In 2006, Mikey G and Dan from Danville won the award for best duet and Best Overall Entry - the duo went on to form the band, Lady Danville. In 2007, Jarell Perry and the Ambassadors won the Las Doñas Award for Best Band Entry. Katie Boeck won the Mortar Board Award for Best Solo Entry and the Northern California Alumni Grand Sweepstakes Award for the Best Overall Entry in 2007, 2008, and 2009. Nasim Pedrad (Saturday Night Live) was a member of the Spring Sing Company in 2003.

Since its revival, Spring Sing was held at UCLA's Los Angeles Tennis Center, but due to the overwhelming demand and popularity of the show, it was moved in 2009 to a much larger venue, Pauley Pavilion, providing the opportunity for more to experience the cherished campus tradition. "Spring Sing 2009 Rock Pauley" made its return debut in Pauley Pavilion on May 8, 2009 and on May 14, 2010. Due to construction on Pauley Pavilion, Spring Sing returned to UCLA's Los Angeles Tennis Center on May 20, 2011. Spring Sing returned to the newly renovated Pauley Pavilion on May 17, 2013 to set a record-breaking attendance for the Student Alumni Association.

Due to the coronavirus pandemic, Spring Sing was moved online in 2020 and 2021. Spring Sing 2022 premiered in person at the Los Angeles Tennis Center on May 20, 2022 at 8PM PT.

== Winners ==
	1978	1991	1997	2005	2006	2007	2008	2009	2010	2011	2012	2013	2014	2015	2016	2017	2018	2019	2022
Northern California Alumni Grand Sweepstakes Award (Overall)		Jon Augustine – “New York State of Mind”		Willie Chase, "Open Seas"	Mikey G and Dan from Danville, "Cast Away."	Katie Boeck, "Colorblind"	Katie Boeck, "White Lies"	Katie Boeck, "Your Part"	DJ Harper, "I Call It Love"	Courtney Randall, "The One"	Alto, "Vocable"	Bruin Harmony "Ignition (Remix)"	Alex Liu and Eric Jung, "Notice You"	Fine Print	Laura Savage "Once"	Eva B. Ross & David Miller, "Chicago"	Hayden Everett & Caroline Pernick, "For I Fear"	Bruin Harmony "Gravity"	The Painted Ladies "Birmingham Again"
Bruin Choice Award (new 2009)		-		-	-	-	-	The Strathmore Players, "Jerry Maguire: The Musical"	DJ Harper, "I Call It Love"	James Bunning, "One More"	Alto, "Vocable"	The Street Hearts	Alex Liu and Eric Jung, "Notice You"	ACA Hip Hop	ACA Hip Hop	The Inner Sanctum	Hayden Everett & Caroline Pernick	TAXI	Outspoken/The Painted Ladies "Birmingham Again"
UCLA Mortar Board Award (Solo)		Jon Augustine – “New York State of Mind”	Mark Armstrong, "If I Said I Had it All"	Willie Chase, "Open Seas"	Stacey Capoot, "Dirt"	Katie Boeck, "Colorblind"	Katie Boeck, "White Lies"	Katie Boeck, "Your Part"	DJ Harper, "I Call It Love"	Courtney Randall, "The One"	Courtney Randall, "Wild"	Sarah Summers	Nessa Rica Ramos (Nessa Rica), “Saving the World”	Natalie Brainin		BEL	Emily James	Nina Marie	
UCLA Mortar Board Award (Duet)			Sapphire (Melanie Xanthos, Patrick Hackett), "You Were Meant for Me"																
Rose Bowl Bruins Award (Duet)					Mikey G and Dan from Danville, "Cast Away"	Horse Crash, "Please Be"	The Payphones, "Sabanilla"			Arianna and Kabir, "I Can't Help Myself"			Alex Liu and Eric Jung, "Notice You"	Priscillia and Alan	Laura Savage	Eva B. Ross & David Miller	Hayden Everett & Caroline Pernick	Ulani & Kevin	
UCLA Las Donas Award (Band)			PKs, "Holding Out for a Hero"	Dani Nicole	Kevin Carey and the Quest Band	Jarell Perry & The Ambassadors, "Hopeless"	3:26, "Undo"	Rapture City Philharmonic, "Press Play"	thatwasthen, "Mr. Politician"	thatwasthen "This Is War"	Alto, "Vocable"	The Street Hearts	We the Folk, "Won’t You Come Back?"	Fine Print	Aizehi and the Funkth Dimension	HELEN	JADED		
UCLA Prytanean Alumnae Award (A cappella)		The Shinga Ringa Dinga Linga Lings – “All That Class” Pamela Holt, Rachel Bacon, Perri Darweesh Tong, Carrie Bacon		Voices, "Goodbye"	Random Voices, "Sweet Dreams"	Bruin Harmony, "Ice, Ice Baby"	Scattertones, "Always Be My Baby"	Scattertones, "If You're Out There"	Bruin Harmony, "I Want You Back"	Scattertones, "Wavin' Flag"	Bruin Harmony, "Hold it Against Me"	Bruin Harmony	Random Voices A Cappella, "Like a Prayer"	Signature A Cappella	ScatterTones	Scattertones	Bruin Harmony	Bruin Harmony "Gravity"	
UCLA Affiliates Award (Production)		Alpha Gamma Omega & Chi Omega, "The Bruin Way"		Chi Omega and Alpha Gamma Omega "When Joe Met Josie"	Pi Kappa Phi & Delta Gamma, "Alice in Westwoodland"	Pi Kappa Phi & Delta Gamma, "Love of the Game"	The Strathmore Players, "Jerry Maguire: The Musical"	Gleeche, "The Fame of the High School Glee Club"	Pi Kappa Phi & Delta Gamma "Candy Land"	Omechi, "Hangover: The Musical"	HOOLIGAN Theatre Company, "Bruin and the Beast"	HOOLIGAN Theatre Company, "The Boy Who Wouldn’t Graduate"	HOOLIGAN Theatre Company, "The Bruin King"	HOOLIGAN Theatre Company, "School Wars: The Rivalry Awakens"	HOOLIGAN Theatre Company, "Out of Time"				
Judges Special Award (Honorable mention)				The Jumpmen "Jumpmen Jazz"	Willie Chase and Jeremy Pagan, "Lying Feet"		Trish Johnson, "Without You"	Bruin Harmony, "Magic Carpet Ride"	Christopher Geno, "Does it Matter?"	Katie Boeck, "Real World"									
Gold Shield Alumnae Esprit de Corps Award (Overall participation)		The Shinga Ringa Dinga Linga Lings, Pamela Holt		The Scattertones		Scattertones	Signature a Cappella	Bruin Harmony	The Trees, "Barefoot in the Promised Land, Screaming!"	Signature a Cappella	Bruin Harmony	Theta Xi / ADPi	The AM	Lashon Halley	Tom Shay	Haylee Hessell	Austin Gatus and Ryan Glatt	Jahanvi & Matheus	
Best Group Director Award	Sigma Kappa & Alpha Tau Omega Production	Kappa Delta & Delta Tau Delta		Sara Sposito and Julian Diaz from Kappa Delta and Delta Tau Delta	Chi Omega & Alpha Gamma Omega Production	Kappa Kappa Psi & Tau Beta Sigma Production	Pi Kappa Phi & Delta Gamma Production	Pi Kappa Phi & Delta Gamma Production	Pi Kappa Phi & Delta Gamma Production	Signature a Cappella		Delta Gamma & Lambda Chi Alpha	The Inner Sanctum	Scattertones – Maya Schulefand	Gamma Phi Beta and Pi Kappa Phi - Rejina Silva	Danielle Singer, Awaken A Capella		Awaken A Capella	
The Sasan Ahoraian Company Award (Best Company skit)							i-Phone	Paw Print (A Twilight Spoof)	Club B-Cafe	UCLA vs. USC Rap Battle	Now 1919	Powell Anthem	Flight of the Walkingjay - Art in Motion	Quarter System Rap	Powell Owl	Stranger Campus		Grapes with Egg	
William C. Ackerman Award (Best Ensemble Entry)			The Roustabouts, "Black Velvet"																

== Judges and masters of ceremonies ==
Celebrities have served as judges and master of ceremonies. They have included former President Ronald Reagan (1952), actor Jason Alexander, Fred MacMurray, conductor André Previn, Christopher Gorham (Ugly Betty), Ryan Carnes (Desperate Housewives), Amber Stevens (Greek), Dr. Bill Dorfman (Extreme Makeover), Tatyana Ali (The Fresh Prince of Bel-Air), Sarah Drew (Grey's Anatomy) and Todd White, a member of the lead animation team for "SpongeBob SquarePants".

Others were actors Sean Astin, Ian Buchanan, Dennis Haskins, Andrew Keegan, Tina Majorino, Danica McKellar (The Wonder Years), and Patrick Renna. 2009 judges included model Janice Dickinson, actress Shelley Long, local KNBC-TV newscaster Ted Chen, and Melissa Joan Hart.

2012 – Bill Dorfman, Nikki Soohoo (The Lovely Bones), Lady Danville, DJ Felli Fel, Taylor Armstrong (Real Housewives of Beverly Hills), Thomas Ian Nicholas, Pentatonix, Michael Strahan, Candace Cameron Bure (DJ Tanner from Full House), Sara Bareilles

2013 – Paula Abdul (American Idol), Chord Overstreet (Sam from Glee), Mike Warren (Hill Street Blues), Jensen Ackles (Supernatural), Elisabetta Canalis, Beth Behrs (2 Broke Girls), Francia Raisa (The Secret Life of the American Teenager)

2014 – David Ravetch, Dr. Bill Dorfman, Ken Komisar, Johnathan Franklin, Fiona Gubelmann, Jonathan Bennett, Brett Davern, Raven-Symoné, Jordyn Wieber, and Dennis Quaid

2015 – Sophie Simmons, Kingsley, Jeanine Mason, 8ky 6lu - The Party President, Elaine Hendrix, Jonathan Bennett, Clayton Snyder, Shwayze, Beau Mirchoff, Kathy Bates

2016 – Brett Dier of “Jane the Virgin,” actress Alyson Stoner and Jim O'Heir of “Parks and Recreation,”

2022 – Gene Block, Merlyn Wood, Olly Sholotan, Abigail Barlow, Nigel Lythgoe OBE, Jim O'Heir, Dom McLennon, and Vincent Martella

== The George and Ira Gershwin Award ==
In 1936, George and Ira Gershwin adapted the title song from their musical Strike Up the Band as a new Bruin fight song for the growing university. In recognition of their contributions to American music and their gift to UCLA, the UCLA Student Alumni Association established the annual George and Ira Gershwin Award for Lifetime Musical Achievement in 1988.

Winners have included:

- 1988 Angela Lansbury
- 1989 Ella Fitzgerald
- 1990 Sarah Vaughan
- 1991 Ray Charles
- 1992 Debbie Allen
- 1993 Natalie Cole
- 1994 Mel Torme
- 1995 Bernadette Peters
- 1996 Tom Petty
- 1997 Randy Newman
- 1998 John Lee Hooker
- 1999 Diane Warren
- 2000 Frank Sinatra
- 2001 Clive Davis
- 2002 Stevie Wonder
- 2003 k.d. lang
- 2004 James Taylor
- 2005 Kenneth Babyface Edmonds
- 2006 Burt Bacharach
- 2007 Quincy Jones
- 2008 Lionel Richie
- 2009 Julie Andrews, actress and singer
- 2010 Sasan Ahoraian Memorial Tribute
- 2011 Brian Wilson
- 2012 Bruce Lundvall
- 2013 MC Hammer
- 2014 Alanis Morissette
- 2015 Anthony Kiedis
- 2016 The Who: Pete Townshend & Roger Daltrey
- 2017 Ziggy Marley
- 2018 Linkin Park
- 2019 None
- 2022 Hans Zimmer
- 2024 Dave Grohl
- 2025 The Temptations
- 2026 Mark Foster

Lionel Richie said at Spring Sing 2008: "Forget about surviving 30 some-odd years in the music business; Lionel Richie survived 27 years of Nicole Richie".

Julie Andrews said at her award ceremony: "Go Bruins. Beat 'SC ... let the Gershwin tunes strike up the band to celebrate every one of those victories."

On May 3, 2019, singer-songwriter Don McLean was awarded the Gershwin Award. However, after it was revealed of McLean's previous domestic violence case and conviction in 2016, the Student Alumni Association rescinded the award on May 6, 2019.

== Committee ==
Spring Sing is organized and executed each year by a committee of UCLA students of the Student Alumni Association (SAA) who are selected by the SAA Board of Directors and the UCLA Alumni Association advisors. There are 8 different positions on the Spring Sing committee. Each position carries with it specific responsibilities for the successful implementation of the show.

	2008	2009	2010	2011	2012	2013	2014	2015	2016	2017	2018	2019	2020	2021	2022	2023	2024	2025	2026
Executive Director	Ruben Garcia	Ali Owens	Aly Yarris	Kelsey Balance	Kevin Yang	Turner Pope	Susan Peters	Max Baker	Alexis Caddell	Paige Allenspach	Shaina Metha	Kayla Samuels	Jess Grimes	Bella Stenvall	Ava Blanchette	Laura de Beer, Alec Tashima	Aidan Brooks, Maddie Browning	Maile Hanoian, Jaden Oquendo	Shirin Dunker
Assistant Director		Nina Garcia		Samantha Slama	Antoinette Brou	Maddy Matson	Jordyn Berk	Brianna Kaplan	Valentia Shen	Torri Johnson	Bre Brown	Irene Ho	William Cryer	Lauren Solouki	Andy Ceja	Emily Noronha	Margaret Meyers	Anna Neiger	Heer Shinglot
Talent Directors	Katie LaBouff, Sydney Pritchett, Amber Bissell	Emily George, Samantha; Mueller, Brian Tran	Courtney Bradley, Ythy Ho, Alex Reichert	Nicole Jazayeri, Reid Taguchi, Leah Whitehead	Shannon Nguyen, Alexandra Petro, Lisa Phan	Taylor Acampora, Jen Hioki, Amanda Peterson	Alyssa Capili, Sean Santhon, Danielle Romero	Dominic Butler, Abby Freemire, Vanessa Guerrero	Anna Stewart, Natalie Horan, John Roberson	Angela Navas, Kayla Samuels, Chelsea Brody	Kimmy Crickette, Sumant Iyer, Bella Stenvall	Rohan Desikan, Natalie Hynes, Jess Grimes	Talia Aranha, Emily Kohl, Alec Tashima	Mikayla LoBasso, Karina Maciel, Haley Mark	Andrew Luff, Natalie Rose, Kaylee Reyes	Hope Phahla, Adam Thaw, Jeffrey Lim	Carla Romero, Mason Tsang, Marshall Bennett	Kati Rady Pentek, Emily Topkis	Christian Cabral, Michelle Ikejiani
Company Directors	Yong Kim and Jeremy Alm	David Larsen, Cassi Porter	Kelsey Balance	Jenna Kieselbach, Whitney Harrison	Leslie Grant, Susan Peters	Katya Lavine, Spencer Louie	Kimmy Miura, Kylynn Guittierez	Ali Wolff, Amir Ghowsi	Luke Branscum, Carling Farley	Madison Colli, Caroline Desler	Giulia Marsella, Jacob Fisher	Addy Sisk, Austin Newton	Katie Byrne, Katie Wong	Claire Dinauer, Kieran McCarthy	Hanna Skikne, Charlotte Jacobs	Evan Starr, Marley Adler	Shirin Dunker, Harry Song	Olivia Kang, Chloe Garton	Sean Anderson, Tara Bobbarjung
Public Relations (Marketing Directors)	Candice Chen, Jaclyn Hong, Kiana Pourjanfeshan	Justin; Manduke, Kiesha Nazarenus, Tyler Phan	Melissa Chiong, Maiah Parks, Samantha Slama	Nicholas Phelps, Sialoren Spaulding, Erin Wallace	Julie Lee, Briana Munoz-Flores	Danielle Ross, Will Sholan	Kevin Yang, Caitlin Nordberg	Sam Delgadillo, Kelsey Chan	David Deng, Ariana Michael	Will Van Der Wey, Sarah Henry	Roz Chiang, Julia Ho	Elisa Ciappi, Reyna Paredes	Paige Callan, Annika Carlson	Shannon O'Hollaran, Isha Slavin	Isaac Ericson, Roo Joshi	Audrey Liao, Anshita Lakshmish	Jaden Oquendo, Nicole Augusta	Arielle Ambrose, Kenan Rottman, Miya Yamamoto	Avery Yew, Hanna Masri, Yoomi Willis
Judges & Awards Directors	Lauren Poblete, Gina Nuti	Amanda Hill, Rachna Shenoy, Rikin Tank	Lina Kaisey, Felicia Xu, Kevin Yang		Michelle Klein, Turner Pope	Allie Garavaglia, Eleni Lewis	Emily James, Mikaela Ihm	Ali Adam, Disha Bhagwat, Veronica Kwiatkowski	Grace Hunter, Alex Taylor, Nicole Nordstrom	Geena Shah, Jason Gelfat, Hannah Schroeder	Chloe Zgorzelski, Julia Swart, Jay Narimatsu	Lauren Hayat, Corban Lethcoe, Mackenzi Greene	Abigail Fitzgibbon, Sarah Freese, Raksha Narasimhan	Aisha Gupta, Sara Daar, Carly Varkel	Alex Middler, Maile Hanoian, Nate Mailhot	Nikki Aviv, Charlotte Bradley	Aidan Singh, Saiya Smith	Caroline Meyers, Ella Gates, Kailyn Yi	Jenna Amos, Solimar Schmidt
VIP Relations				Meredith Callan, Joselyn Delgado															
George & Ira Gershwin Award Director	Lindsey Olson	Martha Abundis	Nancy Juarez		Emma Citrin	Maddie Hulstrom	Ashley Lamhofer	Marina Stoye	Kara Logan	Daniella Chernack	Madison Acampora	Isabella Dohil	Lane Mankoff		Riki Resch	Sean Seo			
Production Director	Robert Frink	Lizette Aguirre	Leah Titus	Danny Durbin	Timothy Krause, Tiffany Le	Katie Romanolo	Stephanie Ma, Val Fong	Ariana Stanton, Kelli Tani	Daniel Lee, Kathryn Yang	Hannah Bocarsly, Matt Lawrence	Vito Sipila, Swapnil Bhardwaj	Maripau Paz, Jason Peters	Aarushi Kapoor, Lindsay Lathrop	Diana Lopez, Itai Tismansky	Aidan Brooks, John Smith	Omeed Kalan, Lisa Barooah, Ken Isaka	Elizabeth Salgado, Dylan Choppin	Phoebe Qian, Casper Holden	Asher Kessler, Christina Naser
Multimedia Director			Yan Zhang																

== Company ==
One tradition of Spring Sing is Company, a collection of eight to thirteen students who help host with comedic sketches between performances. Usual topics include student life, popular culture, and notable events on campus or in general. Notable alumni of Company include Mikey Day and Nasim Pedrad.

Company members
Year	Members
1991	Pamela Holt, Rachel Bacon, Carrie Bacon, Perri Darweesh Tong, Jon Augustine
1992	Dana Baron, Jennifer Garson, Wendy Frawley, Eliot Hochberg, Heather Kolde, Lesli Margherita, Matt Sutherland, Eiko Yamamoto
1993	
1994	
1995	
1996	Dani De Jesus, Martin Gabaya, Todd Sargent
1997	
1998	
1999	
2000	
2001	
2002	
2003	Mikey Day, Jessie Gaskell, Kevin Hampton, Abby Henchmann, Ben Larson, Nasim Pedrad, Tiffany Reaves, Dean Sage, Alex Spilger, Leah Sprecher, Kim Weisberg
2005	Kevin Bince, Jim Brandon, Jessie Gaskell, Kevin Hampton, Helen Shao, Brian Singleton, Chris Smith, Emily Sullivan
2006	Jim Brandon, Josh English, Keith Goss, Trenten Chase Huntington, Jenny Lauritsen, Mandy Muenzer, Shaiya Rahman, Lauren Sill, Brian Singleton, Chris Smith, Mike Stevenson, Lisa Zine
2007	Kean Almryde, Jim Brandon, Keye Chen, Jack DeSena, Melissa Eelkema, Caity Engler, Mark Iverson, Kelly McLean, Aadit Patel, Jordan Riggs, Lauren Sill, Jennifer Sim, Chris Smith
2008	Sasan Ahoraian, Kean Almryde, Shane Billings, Candace Gragnani, Matt Griffin, Kareem Hammad, Mark Iverson, Michael Lyons, Dylan Matteson, Constance Reese, Regan Riskas, Katy Tang, Madison Vanderberg
2009	Sasan Ahoraian, Kean Almryde, Shane Billings, Ben Goldsmith, Mark Stewart Iverson, Michelle Lin, Heather Losey, Dylan Matteson, Jackson McNeill, Sydney Pritchett, Jordan Riggs, Regan Riskas, Christine Takaichi, Madison Vanderberg.
2010	Shane Billings, Colin Davis, Ben Goldsmith, Steve Greene, Maddy Grubman, Kyle Lau, Jessie Linn, Ashley Morrissey, Dean Otsuka, Jake Perkowski, Kevin Ruane, Madison Vanderberg.
2011	Kimia Behpoornia, Colin Davis, Margaret Gardner, Benjamin Goldsmith, Steve Greene, Maddy Grubman, Albert Heng, Kyle Lau, Jessie Linn, Ashley Morrissey, Jake Perkowski, Kevin Ruane, Nick Smith, Lauren Vally, AJ White
2012	Kimia Behpoornia, Ida Cuttler, Alexis de Lucia, Levi Dygert, Karel Ebergen, Adam Epelbaum, Maddy Grubman, Kausar Mohammed, Taylor Patterson, Nick Smith, Jake Tieman, Lauren Vally, Alex Vergel
2013	Kimia Behpoornia, Ida Cuttler, Karel Ebergen, Nathan Galovan, Angela Giarratana, Jack Harrison, Tucker Marsano, Kausar Mohammed, Matt Panopio, Katheryne Penny, Alex Vergel, Michael Yanoska
2014	Kimia Behpoornia, Anthony DeBenedetti, Nathan Galovan, Luke Gane, Lila Gavares, Angela Giarratana, Lea Guillory, Andrew Hahn, Tucker Marsano, Kausar Mohammed, Joel Ontiveros, Marisa Statton, Alex Vergel
2015	Landen Baldwin, Rafe Blood, Elliott Desai, Matt Driver, Lila Gavares, Angela Giarratana, Emily Kerrigan, KJ Knies, Charley Rock, Dolapo Sangokoya, Marisa Statton, Marnina Wirtschafter
2016	Lila Gavares, Emily Kerrigan, Matt Driver, Landen Baldwin, Charley Rock, Jake Dvorksy, Natalina Cosenza, Guya Frazier, Danielle Kay, Brett Sebade, Jules Lom, Brandon Papo
2017	Avalon Penrose, Brandon Papo, Brett Sebade, Cory Lane, Danielle Kay, Emily Kerrigan, Hannah Connery, Jake Dvorsky, Jeremy Elder, Marie Osterman, Natalina Cosenza, Nathan Glovinsky, Olly Sholotan
2018	Avalon Penrose, Danielle Koenig, Hannah Connery, Irvin Mason Jr, Jake Dvorsky, Jeremy Elder, Madison Dahm, Natasha Williams, Nathan Glovinsky, Olly Sholotan, Spencer Martin, Wes Dunlap
2019	Jamie Atlas, Leah Bercovitch, Owen Braithwaite, Madison Dahm, Eliza Dillon, Jeremy Elder, Eliza Faloona, Jakob Garberg, Nathan Glovinsky, Danielle Koenig, Melissa Peng, Olly Sholotan
2020	Jamie Atlas, Hanna Barlow, Devin Bennett, Owen Braithwaite, Jacob Cherry, Eliza Dillon, Mackenzi Elias, Jake Garberg, Sophie Landeck, Irvin Mason Jr., Achintya Pandey, Viva Rose
2021	Hanna Barlow, Owen Braithwaite, Jacob Cherry, Bennett Cohen, Grace Cohen, Eliza Dillon, Scott Hoover, Sophie Landeck, Achintya Pandey, Ellen Relac, Nick Rodriguez, Rachel Stubington
2022	Hanna Barlow, Jacob Cherry, Bennett Cohen, Grace Cohen, Davide Costa, Nick Delzompo, Isabella Navarro, Ellen Relac, Nick Rodriguez, Kathryn Steenburgh, Rachel Stubington, Brandon Wang
2023	Bennett Cohen, Davide Costa, Nick Delzompo, Tess Maretz, James Morris, Max Orroth, Ellie Rice, Kathryn Steenburgh, Caity Wilson, Brianna Yi
2024	Isaiah Bowes, Logan Chin, Davide Costa, Josh Dittrich, Jessica Gao, Chloe Johnson, Tess Maretz, Aneesha Nema, Ellie Rice, Jason Scruggs, Kathryn Steenburgh, Brianna Yi
2025	Imani Brutlag, Nate Carman, Logan Chin, Sawyer Findley, Jessica Gao, Tess Maretz, Keeley Mizell, Ellie Rice, Jason Scruggs, Brianna Yi
2026	Caitlin Devenney, Leo Kitaen, Josephine LaCrosse, Gavin Liu, Cameryn Mitchell, Pete Sansone, Walker Stephenson, Copeland Williams, Jonas Williams

== Sources ==
- "List of "George and Ira Gershwin Award" Recipients". Archived from the original on September 27, 2007.
- "UCLA Spring Sing". Archived from the original on September 27, 2007.
- "Spring Sing 2009".
