= Black Reel Award for Outstanding Supporting Actor, Drama Series =

Annual US television award

- Awarded for: Outstanding Supporting Actor, Drama Series
- Country: United States
- Presented by: Black Reel Awards for Television
- First award: 2017
- Currently held by: Wood Harris, Winning Time: The Rise of the Lakers Dynasty (2022)
- Website: blackreelawards.com

This article lists the winners and nominees for the Black Reel Award for Television for Outstanding Supporting Actor, Drama Series. This category was first introduced in 2017 and won by Ron Cephas Jones for This Is Us. Giancarlo Esposito currently holds the record for most nominations in this category with five.

== Winners and nominees ==
Winners are listed first and highlighted in bold.

=== 2010s ===
Year	Actor	Series	Network	Ref
2017
2017	**Ron Cephas Jones**	**This Is Us**	**NBC**	
2017	Jovan Adepo	The Leftovers	HBO	
2017	Joe Morton	Scandal	ABC	
2017	Trai Byers	Empire	FOX	
2017	Jeffrey Wright	Westworld	HBO	
2018
2018	**Omar Dorsey**	**Queen Sugar**	**OWN**	
2018	Jacob Latimore	The Chi	Showtime	
2018	Joe Morton	Scandal	ABC	
2018	Harold Perrineau	Claws	TNT	
2018	Dondré Whitfield	Queen Sugar	OWN	
2019
2019	**Joe Morton**	**God Friended Me**	**CBS**	
2019	Giancarlo Esposito	Better Call Saul	AMC	
2019	Orlando Jones	American Gods	Starz	
2019	Mustafa Shakir	Luke Cage	Netflix	
2019	Nicholas Ashe	Queen Sugar	OWN	

=== 2020s ===
Year	Actor	Series	Network	Ref
2020
2020	**Giancarlo Esposito**	**Godfather of Harlem**	**Epix**	
2020	Delroy Lindo	The Good Fight	CBS All Access	
2020	Ashton Sanders	Wu-Tang: An American Saga	HULU	
2020	Larenz Tate	Power	Starz	
2020	Jeffrey Wright	Westworld	HBO	
2021
2021	**Michael K. Williams**	**Lovecraft Country**	**HBO**	
2021	Giancarlo Esposito	Godfather of Harlem	Epix	
2021	Giancarlo Esposito	The Mandalorian	Disney+	
2021	Amin Joseph	Snowfall	FX	
2021	Niles Fitch	This Is Us	NBC	
2022
2022	**Wood Harris**	**Winning Time: The Rise of the Lakers Dynasty**	**HBO**	
2022	Giancarlo Esposito	Better Call Saul	AMC	
2022	Adrian Holmes	Bel-Air	Peacock	
2022	Clarke Peters	The Man Who Fell to Earth	Showtime	
2022	Olly Sholotan	Bel-Air	Peacock	

== Superlatives ==
Superlative	Outstanding Supporting Actor, Drama Series
Actor with most awards	Omar Dorsey; Giancarlo Esposito; Wood Harris; Ron Cephas Jones; Joe Morton; Michael K. Williams (1)
Actor with most nominations	Giancarlo Esposito (5)
Actor with most nominations without ever winning	Jeffrey Wright (2)

== Programs with multiple nominations ==
3 nominations

- Queen Sugar

2 nominations

- Bel-Air
- Better Call Saul
- Godfather of Harlem
- Scandal
- This Is Us
- Westworld

== Performers with multiple nominations ==
5 nominations

- Giancarlo Esposito

3 nominations

- Joe Morton

2 nominations

- Jeffrey Wright

== Total awards by network ==
- HBO - 2
- CBS - 1
- EPIX - 1
- NBC - 1
- OWN - 1
