= Bel-Air (film) =

2019 short fan film

- Film poster
- Directed by: Morgan Cooper
- Written by: Morgan Cooper
- Based on: The Fresh Prince of Bel-Air by: Andy Borowitz; Susan Borowitz
- Produced by: Johnny Starke; Kerry Rounds; Morgan Cooper; Corey McCartney
- Starring: Jerry Madison; Sherri Roulette-Mosley; Granvile O’Neal; Kira Ashby; Jelani Talib; Rufus Burns; Sada K.; Khrystal Coppage; Jada Paige
- Cinematography: Morgan Cooper
- Edited by: Morgan Cooper; Anthony Devera
- Music by: B. Jones; Mark Francis; Duncan Burnett; Easy Mccoy
- Production company: Sun Squared Media
- Distributed by: Sun Squared Media
- Release date: March 10, 2019
- Running time: 4 minutes
- Language: English

Bel-Air is a 2019 short fan film written and directed by Morgan Cooper, based on the 1990s sitcom The Fresh Prince of Bel-Air. The film serves as a mock trailer for a darker, more dramatic re-imagining of the sitcom. It was uploaded on YouTube on March 10, 2019.

In August 2020, it was announced that it was being developed into a full television show, with Cooper and original series star Will Smith as executive producers. The series had reportedly been in the works for over a year since Cooper posted his Bel-Air trailer on YouTube, with Netflix, NBC's Peacock, and HBO Max all bidding for the series. On September 8, 2020, it was picked up by Peacock, which gave Bel-Air a two-season order.

== Plot ==
After being involved in a gang fight during a street basketball game, Will Smith is sent by his mother out of the rough streets of Philadelphia to live with his uncle and aunt in the affluent neighborhood of Bel Air, Los Angeles, in the hopes of straightening out his life.

== Cast ==
- Jerry Madison as Will Smith (originally played by Will Smith)
- Sherri Roulette-Mosley as Vy Smith (originally played by Vernee Watson)
- Granvile O'Neal as Uncle Phil Banks (originally played by James Avery)
- Kira Ashby as Aunt Viv Banks (originally played by Janet Hubert-Whitten and Daphne Maxwell Reid)
- Jelani Talib as Carlton Banks (originally played by Alfonso Ribeiro)
- Rufus Burns as Jazz (originally played by Jeffrey Townes)
- Sada K. as Hilary Banks (originally played by Karyn Parsons)
- Khrystal Coppage as Ashley Banks (originally played by Tatyana M. Ali)
- Jada Paige as Lisa Fuller (based on the character Lisa Wilkes, originally played by Nia Long)

NOTE: The characters Geoffrey Butler and Nicky Banks (portrayed by Joseph Marcell and Ross Bagley in the original series) do not appear in the film.

== Production ==
Morgan Cooper shot the Philadelphia sequences of Bel-Air in his hometown of Kansas City, Missouri, in a span of six months.

== Reception and expansion ==
Will Smith, who played the main character of the original sitcom, heavily praised the fan film, commenting that "Morgan did a ridiculous trailer for Bel-Air. Brilliant idea, the dramatic version of The Fresh Prince for the next generation." He also hinted at options of expanding the idea beyond the short film.

On August 11, 2020, the series Bel-Air was officially announced after being in the works for over a year. At the time, Netflix, HBO Max, and Peacock were bidding for the rights to the show. On September 8, 2020, Peacock gave the series a two-season order under the title Bel-Air, with Westbrook Inc. and Universal Television producing. Smith and Cooper executive-produce, alongside Terence Carter, James Lassiter, Miguel Melendez, Malcolm Spellman, Quincy Jones, Benny Medina, Andy Borowitz, and Susan Borowitz. An online premiere for the series was held on February 9, 2022, by Crown & Conquer. The series premiered on Peacock on February 13, 2022.
