= Don't Tell Mom the Babysitter's Dead (2024 film) =

Film by Wade Allain-Marcus

- Theatrical release poster
- Directed by: Wade Allain-Marcus
- Screenplay by: Chuck Hayward
- Story by: Chuck Hayward; Neil Landau; Tara Ison
- Based on: Don't Tell Mom the Babysitter's Dead by: Neil Landau; Tara Ison
- Produced by: Juliet Berman; Oren Segal; Justin Nappi; Juliana Maio
- Starring: Simone Joy Jones; Patricia "Ms. Pat" Williams; Jermaine Fowler; June Squibb; Nicole Richie
- Cinematography: Matt Clegg
- Edited by: Aric Lewis
- Music by: Jonathan Scott Friedman
- Production companies: BET+ Original Film; Spiral Stairs Entertainment; Treehouse Pictures; SMiZE Productions
- Distributed by: Iconic Events Releasing
- Release date: April 12, 2024
- Running time: 95 minutes
- Country: United States
- Language: English

Don't Tell Mom the Babysitter's Dead is a 2024 American coming-of-age black comedy film and remake of the 1991 film. It was directed by Wade Allain-Marcus, written by Chuck Hayward and stars Simone Joy Jones, Ms. Pat, Jermaine Fowler, June Squibb, and Nicole Richie while Joanna Cassidy, Keith Coogan, and Danielle Harris from the original film also appear.

The plot revolves around teenager Tanya who has to take care of her siblings after their elderly babysitter dies while their mother is away. To make ends meet, she gets a job at a fashion company.

It was released in the United States on April 12, 2024.

== Plot ==
Sue Ellen, aka "Tanya", is an LA 17-year-old black girl. She lives with her corporate executive, single mother Joan, stoner skateboarder brother Kenny, screen-addicted sister Melissa, and geeky ornithologist brother Zack, who loves the San Fernando Valley area crows. Tanya plans to attend Howard University in the fall, so is preparing a summer trip to Spain with her friends.

However, due to an incident at work, Joan is sent on a business retreat in Thailand, so Tanya misses her trip. Deciding her children cannot be left alone, she hires Ms. Sturak. She is a white, alcoholic, devoutly Christian, pistol wielding, spinster babysitter.

Although Ms. Sturak acts politely with Joan, once alone with the children, she is abusive. She tosses Kenny's cigarettes, vape pens, and marijuana; destroys Melissa's video games and movies and connects Zack to a harness to prevent his birdwatching. Ms. Sturak says Tanya's clothes and makeup make her look like a whore, then shows her internet photos of people with STD's.

Fed up with Ms. Sturak, the children secretly throw a house party. Saying it is bible study, Ms. Sturak allows them. The sleeping carer is awakened by the noise, so goes to investigate. She suffers a heart attack from the chaos.

The next morning, Tanya finds Ms. Sturak dead. Fearing trouble with their mother and the police, the children first try to hide the body in the garage freezer. However, Ms. Sturak is too heavy, so her corpse keeps falling out.

They then try to stage a drunk driving death scene, strapping Ms. Sturak's dead body into her car's driver's seat and aiming it at a tree. It ends up in the water. Unfortunately, the cash earmarked for their summer expenses was left in Ms. Sturak's purse. So, Tanya and Kenny spin a bottle to determine who must get a job, which Tanya loses.

Tanya first works as a ride share driver, which does not pay enough to feed them. However, she drives handsome architect student Bryan to his coworker's wedding, they are immediately attracted, so they exchange numbers. Tanya quits the low-paying job, so Melissa gets her an interview at a highly-paid fashion company by fabricating her resume, references and records. Tanya coincidentally plans to study fashion in school. Kenny and Zack back her up.

At the interview, Tanya immediately connects with vice president Rose, who hires her as her assistant. Her coworker Caroline (who coincidentally is Bryan's sister) clashes with her, as she had wanted the position. Tanya does well at the job.

Kenny also becomes more responsible, learning how to cook and taking care of Melissa and Zack. Tanya soon gets very involved with Bryan, and they start dating. While on a date, Tanya sees Rose's fiancé Gus with another woman, which he asks to hide from Rose.

Tanya discovers her siblings use her company credit card to buy luxury items, which she fears will get her in trouble. To make it up to her, they throw her a Spain themed party, as she missed the trip with her friends.

As the company is at risk of closing, Tanya offers to create a fashion presentation to wow both prospective buyers and the company, hosting it at her house. Meanwhile, a distracted Kenny inadvertently lets Melissa eat a marijuana brownie. Extremely high, she injures herself on the backyard skateboard ramp. Preoccupied with work, Tanya accidentally misses Bryan's architectural school ceremony. Upset, Bryan breaks up with her.

On the night of the presentation, Tanya's siblings help prepare food for the guests, and her friends (back from Spain) model clothes to the buyers and shareholders. Everything goes well, until Joan (back from her trip early) confusingly walks across the runway, and chews out Tanya. The spectators believe it is a stunt and are entertained.

Tanya tells Rose the truth, which she accepts. She offers Tanya to continue at the company, working remotely from school. Tanya makes amends with Caroline, becoming friends. Bryan, also at the presentation, reconciles with Tanya, and they kiss. When Joan asks where Ms. Sturak is, the children explain how and why they disposed of her. Joan does not blame them for what they did, and agrees to keep their secret.

Later, Kenny's best friend Rock asks Rose out, who accepts.

== Cast ==
- Simone Joy Jones as Sue Ellen "Tanya" Crandall, the oldest of four siblings
- Patricia "Ms. Pat" Williams as Mrs. Joan Crandall, Tanya's divorced mother
- Donielle Hansley Jr. as Kenny Crandall, Tanya's younger brother
- Miles Fowler as Bryan, Tanya's love interest
- Jermaine Fowler as Gus Brandon, Rose's fiancé
- Iantha Richardson as Caroline, Tanya's co-worker and Bryan's older sister
- June Squibb as Mrs. Carly Sturak, the Crandall children's babysitter
- Nicole Richie as Rose Lindsay, Tanya's boss
- Carter Young as Zack Crandall, Tanya's younger brother
- Ayaamii Sledge as Melissa Crandall, Tanya's younger sister
- Tyriq Withers as Rock, Kenny's best friend
- Gus Kenworthy as Bruce
- Tyshawn Jones as Jason
- Danielle Harris as a production executive
- Keith Coogan as Asher
- Joanna Cassidy as a fashion show buyer

== Production ==
A remake of Don't Tell Mom the Babysitter's Dead (1991) was announced in May 2020 to be in development by Treehouse Pictures. It was reported to be written by Chuck Hayward with Bille Woodruff attached to direct and was described as a "present-day retelling centered on a black family". In April 2022, Tyra Banks signed on to play Rose.

In late February 2024, it was reported that the film was ultimately developed by BET+. Additionally, Wade Allain-Marcus replaced Woodruff as director. Banks was replaced by Nicole Richie to play Rose, reportedly due to scheduling conflicts with Banks. She served as executive producer and creative advisor through her SMiZE Productions, where she consulted with the film's marketing strategy. June Squibb, Jermaine Fowler, Ms. Pat and Gus Kenworthy, Simone Joy Jones, Donielle Tremaine Hansley, Miles Fowler, Iantha Richardson, and Tyriq Withers round out the main cast. Principal photography took place in Santa Clarita, California in June 2023.

== Release ==
Don't Tell Mom the Babysitter's Dead was released theatrically in the United States by Iconic Events Releasing on April 12, 2024. It began streaming on BET+ on May 16, 2024.

== Reception ==
On the review aggregator website Rotten Tomatoes, 54% of 28 critics' reviews are positive, with an average rating of 5.1/10. The website's consensus reads: "Don't Tell Mom the Babysitter's Dead has some fun with the original film's still-sturdy premise, but it's hard not to wonder whether a remake was really necessary." Metacritic, which uses a weighted average, assigned the film a score of 62 out of 100, based on 10 critics, indicating "generally favorable" reviews.
