= Don't Tell Mom the Babysitter's Dead =

1991 film by Stephen Herek

- Theatrical release poster
- Directed by: Stephen Herek
- Written by: Neil Landau; Tara Ison
- Produced by: Robert F. Newmyer; Brian Reilly; Jeffery Silver
- Starring: Christina Applegate; Joanna Cassidy; Keith Coogan; John Getz; Josh Charles
- Cinematography: Tim Suhrstedt
- Edited by: Larry Bock
- Music by: David Newman
- Production companies: HBO; Outlaw Productions; Cinema Plus L.P.
- Distributed by: Warner Bros.
- Release date: June 7, 1991
- Running time: 102 minutes
- Country: United States
- Language: English
- Box office: $25.1 million

Don't Tell Mom the Babysitter's Dead is a 1991 American coming-of-age black comedy film directed by Stephen Herek, written by Neil Landau and Tara Ison, and starring Christina Applegate, Joanna Cassidy, Keith Coogan, John Getz, and Josh Charles. The plot focuses on a 17-year-old girl who assumes the role as head of the house when the elderly babysitter whom her mother had hired to watch over her kids while she is in Australia suddenly dies.

Don't Tell Mom the Babysitter's Dead was released in theaters on June 7, 1991, and grossed $25.1 million. Despite receiving generally negative reviews from critics upon release, it developed a reputation as a cult film following its release on VHS and cable television.

A remake was released in the United States on April 12, 2024.

== Plot ==
Sue Ellen "Swell" Crandell is a 17-year-old Los Angeles high school graduate who cannot afford to accompany her friends to Europe for the summer. When her divorced mother leaves on a vacation to Australia with her boyfriend, Swell looks forward to a summer of freedom with her siblings 16-year-old Kenny, 14-year-old Zach, 12-year-old Melissa, and 10-year-old Walter. Much to the children's dismay, their mother hires a live-in babysitter named Mrs. Sturak, a seemingly sweet elderly woman who assures Mrs. Crandell that she can look after all five children.

As soon as Mrs. Crandell leaves, Mrs. Sturak shows her true colors as a tyrant, angering the children. After Swell discovers Mrs. Sturak has died in her sleep, the children worry that their summer will be ruined if they notify the authorities. They stuff Mrs. Sturak's body in a trunk and drop it off at a local mortuary, with a note that reads, "Nice Old Lady Inside, Died of Natural Causes". However, the children realize that the spending money given by their mother to Mrs. Sturak was with the body when they dropped it off.

To make ends meet, Swell takes a job at a fast-food restaurant called Clown Dog. She makes an impression on her co-worker Bryan, but soon quits due to their obnoxious manager. Swell then forges an extensive résumé under the guise of a Vassar-educated young fashion designer and applies at General Apparel West (GAW), hoping to secure a job as a receptionist. Impressed by her résumé, the company's senior vice president of operations, Rose Lindsey, hires Swell on the spot as an executive assistant, much to the chagrin of Carolyn, a snooty receptionist who was in line for the job.

The inexperienced Swell must balance the adult responsibilities of her work life while still trying to enjoy herself as a teenager. To support the family, she begins stealing from petty cash at GAW, intending to return it when she receives her paycheck. She also begins a relationship with Bryan that becomes strained when she learns he is Carolyn's younger brother. After an argument about Swell's double life, she and Bryan angrily part ways.

Resentful of Swell's promotion, Carolyn schemes with her co-worker Bruce to discredit Swell. Swell must also rebuff the unwelcome advances of Gus Brandon, the philandering vice president of marketing who happens to be dating Rose. Swell is furious when she discovers that her siblings have stolen from the petty cash funds in her purse to buy extravagant gifts, including a state-of-the-art home-entertainment center.

When Swell learns that GAW is on the verge of bankruptcy, she takes it upon herself to create a new clothing line, with Rose suggesting they hold a fashion show to exhibit their new designs. With no petty cash left to rent a banquet hall, Swell offers to host the party, convincing her siblings to help clean the house, beautify the yard and act as caterers. During the party, Rose dumps Gus when Swell exposes his infidelity. Hoping to finally oust Swell, Carolyn presents Rose with a copy of Swell's driver's license to prove she is only a teenager. However, Rose deems Carolyn's efforts as petty jealousy and rebukes her. The party proves a success, with fashion buyers impressed by Swell's designs worn by her friends.

The event abruptly falls apart when Bryan drives up to the house, hoping to reconcile with Swell. When he emerges from the truck, he is confused to see Carolyn there. Meanwhile, Mrs. Crandell arrives home early, forcing Swell to confess her lie in front of everyone. Rose forgives Swell for her deception because buyers were enthusiastic about the show, ensuring the future of the company. Rose offers Swell a job as her personal assistant, but she declines in favor of going to college. After Swell apologizes to Bryan, they make up and kiss. Mrs. Crandell then inquires about Mrs. Sturak.

Two mortuary workers look over Mrs. Sturak's gravestone at the cemetery and plan to use the money found on her to visit Las Vegas. The gravestone reads: "Nice Old Lady – Died of Natural Causes".

== Cast ==
- Christina Applegate as Sue Ellen "Swell" Crandell, 17 years old, the oldest of five siblings
- Joanna Cassidy as Rose Lindsey, the senior vice president of operations at General Apparel West who hires Swell
- John Getz as Gus Brandon, the vice president of marketing at General Apparel West and Rose's philandering boyfriend
- Josh Charles as Bryan, Swell's friend and love interest who works at Clown Dog and Carolyn's brother
- Keith Coogan as Kenny Crandell, 15 years old, the second-oldest sibling who is a slacker and a stoner
- Concetta Tomei as Mrs. Crandell, the siblings' mother
- David Duchovny as Bruce, the head inventory clerk at General Apparel West
- Kimmy Robertson as Cathy, an office worker at General Apparel West
- Jayne Brook as Carolyn, a snooty receptionist at General Apparel West who is Bryan's older sister
- Eda Reiss Merin as Mrs. Sturak, the Crandell children's babysitter who dies on the job
- Robert Hy Gorman as Walter Crandell, Swell's 10-year-old brother
- Danielle Harris as Melissa Crandell, Swell's 12-year-old sister
- Christopher Pettiet as Zach Crandell, Swell's 14-year-old brother
- Chris Claridge as "Lizard", one of Kenny's friends
- Jeff Bollow as "Mole", one of Kenny's friends
- Michael Kopelow as "Hellhound", one of Kenny's friends
- Alejandro Quezada as "Skull", one of Kenny's friends
- Wendy Brainard as Jill, one of Swell's friends
- Sarah Buxton as Tess, one of Swell's friends
- Kawena Charlot as Becky, one of Swell's friends
- Laurie Morrison as Katrina, one of Swell's friends
- Deborah Tucker as Nicole, one of Swell's friends whom Kenny is attracted to
- Frank Dent as Mr. Egg, the obnoxious manager of Clown Dog
- Bryan Clark as Dr. Permutter, an emergency room physician
- Bud as Elvis, Melissa's tri-color Cardigan Welsh Corgi
- Dan Castellaneta as the voice of the animated babysitter seen in the opening credits

== Production ==
According to writers Neil Landau and Tara Ison, the core idea for the film originated in the mid-1980s. Landau was inspired by the 1983 film Risky Business, in which a high-school protagonist is thrust into the adult world and manages to hold his own. The first draft, titled The Real World, was finished in 1987 and sold to 20th Century Fox, but was shelved. Fox wanted a film with a lighter theme than that of the script written by Landau and Ison and envisioned "an actor like Winona Ryder in the starring role". Landau was uneasy with the hiring of Stephen Herek, then known for Bill & Ted's Excellent Adventure, to direct the film.

In 1989, the film was picked up by Outlaw Productions, which attracted Christina Applegate to the project through her Married... with Children costar Ed O'Neill. Joanna Cassidy was cast as Rose Lindsey after a suggestion by Landau. The film was one of David Duchovny's early roles before he achieved mainstream success, but casting director Sharon Bialy had trouble convincing the studio to hire him. Jennifer Love Hewitt was originally cast as Melissa, but had to back out because Disney Channel would not release her from a television show in which she had been starring.

After the production ended, the studio was forced to change the title because of a conflict with MTV's new television series The Real World, and settled on Don't Tell Mom the Babysitter's Dead. Landau was initially unimpressed with the revised title, but accepted it after seeing Johnny Carson make a pun about it.

== Release ==
Warner Bros. released Don't Tell Mom the Babysitter's Dead on June 7, 1991, in 1,802 theaters. The film remained in exhibition for 29 weeks in the United States.

=== Home media ===
The film achieved commercial success on VHS and in HBO airings; reportedly, $1 million was spent on video-store advertisements. HBO Home Entertainment released the film on VHS and LaserDisc on February 19, 1992. HBO later released it on DVD in 2001. As of February 2025, the film is available for digital purchase via Amazon Prime.

== Reception ==
=== Box office ===
Don't Tell Mom the Babysitter's Dead earned $4.2 million during its opening weekend in the United States, ranking number six at the U.S. box office. The film had a total U.S. and Canada gross of $25,196,249, making a small profit but below the filmmakers' expectations.

=== Critical response ===
On the review aggregator website Rotten Tomatoes, 35% of 34 critics' reviews are positive, with an average rating of 3.5/10. The website's consensus reads: "It has an amusing enough premise, but Don't Tell Mom the Babysitter's Dead will just leave viewers pining for the madcap hijinks promised by the title." Metacritic, which uses a weighted average, assigned the film a score of 35 out of 100, based on 20 critics, indicating "generally unfavorable" reviews. Audiences polled by CinemaScore gave the film an average grade of "A-" on an A+ to F scale.

Several reviewers compared the film unfavorably to the then-recent hit Home Alone. Peter Travers of Rolling Stone stated: "Blame the smash of 'Home Alone' for the new herd of kids-on-the-loose movies. Let's hope none are dumber than this one. ... There's no telling how the unflatteringly photographed Applegate delivers a comic line on the big screen, because [screenwriters] Tara Ison and Neil Landau haven't written her any," and concluded by calling the movie "the film equivalent of processed cheese."

Kathleen Maher of The Austin Chronicle described the film as "Home Alone meets Bill & Ted's Excellent Adventure and then visits Working Girl". Roger Ebert was slightly more positive, awarding the film 2 out of 4 stars and calling it "a consumerist, escapist fantasy for teenage girls". Desson Howe of The Washington Post wrote that the film "isn't quite as dead as you might expect" but that "it doesn't exactly pulsate with originality". He ended by complimenting the "subversive elements" that distinguished its otherwise "familiar, pre-sold air". TV Guide said despite the film's "preposterous storyline" that stretches credulity and a script that "might have been sharper, wittier and cleverer, [it] nevertheless achieves on its own level by genuinely involving its young target audience" and becomes "surprisingly entertaining and fun".

Critics in the UK were more positive, with Empire calling it "amusing fluff", and Time Out writing, "This is a sassy little comedy of wit and intelligence from the director of Bill and Ted's Excellent Adventure. As Swell, Applegate is appealing and resourceful, while Coogan's dope-head Kenny contributes to a wonderfully dry, on-going marital spoof. Getz is the unctuous boardroom chauvinist to a tee, and Cassidy rounds off the picture's relaxed Cosmo-feminism as Swell's scatty boss." Tim Pullein of The Guardian wrote, "The latter strand of the story, with broad but engaging satire on office politics and the assorted kidologies of the workplace, gathers a fair head of comic steam." He concluded, "Gilded by personable performances, particularly from [Christina Applegate and Josh Charles], this wish-fulfilling fantasy manages to be wholeheartedly ridiculous in a manner that leaves criticism disarmed."

=== Legacy ===
Despite the critical response on release, the film went on to achieve a cult following on VHS and television.

Applegate suggested the reasons for the film's continued resonance with audiences is its message about second chances. She commented "[Sue Ellen] was kind of pissed off, she was not doing great in school, not participating in her family so much; she was relatable to a lot of teenagers who feel like the burden of the world is on them. They're so dramatic about everything and I think in her success, there's hope. When I've seen it now as an adult, that's what I see: It's a feel-good movie. Everyone gets a second chance, everyone gets the chance to turn themselves around and all kids want to feel that way. They don't want to feel stuck in what they are. These characters give kids hope and I think that's thematically what you walk away from it believing and sensing and seeing."

The film was mentioned by name in the first episode of the WB animated series Animaniacs. In the episode "De-Zanitized", the fictional chairman of the board of Warner Bros., Thaddeus Plotz, says that he has not been this upset since they made Don't Tell Mom the Babysitter's Dead.

== Remake ==
In June 2010, reports surfaced that a remake of the film would be produced by The Mark Gordon Company. Eventually, a remake would be produced by Tyra Banks and her company SMiZE Productions, for release on April 12, 2024. It was produced with the streaming service BET+, directed by Wade Allain-Marcus and starred Simone Joy Jones, Nicole Richie and June Squibb. Joanna Cassidy, Keith Coogan, and Danielle Harris make cameos in the film.

== Sources ==
- Bingen, Steven (2018). Hollywood's Lost Backlot: 40 Acres of Glamour and Mystery. Guildford, Connecticut: Lyons Press. ISBN 978-1-493-03362-1.
