= Spell-Mageddon =

- Genre: Game show
- Presented by: Alfonso Ribeiro
- Country of origin: United States
- Original language: English
- No. of seasons: 1
- No. of episodes: 8

Production
- Executive producers: Adam Freeman; Adam Reed; Jeff Krask; Leslie Greif; Michael Canter
- Production company: Thinkfactory Media

Original release
- Network: ABC Family
- Release: July 24 – September 11, 2013

Spell-Mageddon is an American spelling bee game show hosted by Alfonso Ribeiro. It aired on ABC Family from July 24, 2013, to September 11, 2013.

== Format ==
The show's format combined a spelling bee with obstacle courses similar to Wipeout.

== Episodes ==
No.	Title	Original release date	US viewers (millions)
1	"Episode 1"	July 24, 2013	0.33
2	"Episode 2"	July 31, 2013	0.34
3	"Episode 3"	August 7, 2013	0.29
4	"Episode 4"	August 14, 2013	0.31
5	"Episode 5"	August 21, 2013	0.25
6	"Episode 6"	August 28, 2013	0.19
7	"Episode 7"	September 4, 2013	0.38
8	"Episode 8"	September 11, 2013	0.20

== Reception ==
Mary McNamara of The Los Angeles Times said the show doesn't look fun at all and also said the distractions endured by the contestants are "more annoying than compelling." Emily Ashby Common Sense Media gave the show 3 out of 5 stars.
