= Carlton Banks =

Character on the TV show "Fresh Prince of Bel-Air"

- The Fresh Prince of Bel-Air, In the House, and Bel-Air character
- Alfonso Ribeiro (left) and Olly Sholotan (right) as Carlton Banks.
- First appearance: "The Fresh Prince Project" (1990); "Dreams and Nightmares" (2022)
- Last appearance: "I, Done" (1996)
- Portrayed by: Alfonso Ribeiro (The Fresh Prince of Bel-Air); Jelani Talib (2019 Bel-Air short film); Olly Sholotan (2022 Bel-Air television series)

In-universe information
- Family: Philip Banks (father); Vivian Banks (mother); Hilary Banks (sister); Ashley Banks (sister); Nicky Banks (brother)
- Significant others: Lisa Wilkes (formerly; 2022 Bel-Air television series)
- Relatives: Joe Banks (grandfather); Hattie Banks (grandmother); Eli Smith (grandfather); Lou Smith (uncle); Vy Smith-Wilkes (aunt); Helen Lewis (aunt); Janice Schaeffer (aunt); Will Smith (cousin); Bobby Lewis (cousin); Frank Schaeffer Jr. (cousin); Reuben (great-uncle); Eleanor (great-aunt)

Carlton Banks is a fictional character portrayed by Alfonso Ribeiro on the NBC television sitcom The Fresh Prince of Bel-Air from September 1990 to May 1996, the preppy and politically conservative cousin, main foil, and eventual close friend to Will Smith's cool and street-smart lead character. The character has been praised for portraying a complex and sympathetic foil with an arc of personal growth over the course of the show. The character is also known for a dance with humorously exaggerated movements developed for the character by Ribeiro, which came to be known as "The Carlton". Ribeiro also crossed over his role as Carlton into the In the House episode "Dog Catchers" before returning the following season as series regular Dr. Maxwell Stanton for the remainder of that series' run.

== Development and characteristics ==
Carlton Banks is described as "an affluent teenager attending private school in the ritzy Bel-Air sub-section of Los Angeles", who wore "button-down collared shirts and sweaters". He has preppy characteristics and is a firmly conservative Republican. Writer Andy Borowitz described the character as an effort to portray "the anti-Will". The character was loosely based on the children of Fresh Prince executive producer Quincy Jones, and was named after Borowitz's classmate at Harvard University, Carlton Cuse. However, Carlton "had layers that prevented him from being a one-dimensional snob".

Alfonso Ribeiro, who had previously been in the cast of the 1980s show Silver Spoons, auditioned wearing a track suit. Carlton was Ribeiro's breakout role, in which he "consistently stole scenes from Will Smith". Ribeiro later stated that Carlton was a character that he "had a blast playing for six years", but also noted that for many years thereafter, the role caused him to be "pigeon-holed as an actor based on that character". In 2017, Ribeiro speculated that following the events of the series, Carlton would have tried to follow his father's career path, becoming a lawyer and eventually working towards becoming a judge.

In the 2020 Fresh Prince of Bel-Air Reunion, Smith noted that the show's comedy "was originally centered on the friction between Will and Uncle Phil... but it quickly become evident that the Will-Carlton dynamic would be the series' primary source of humor", and "the tension between Carlton and Will" therefore became "the tension at the heart of the show". Screenwriter Rob Edwards described how he sought to ensure that Carlton would not be a "walking punch-line" like some sitcom antagonists, but would be a strong character, capable of effectively challenging the protagonist. Despite his faults, primarily arrogance, insecurity, and naïveté, Carlton is also shown as having a number of qualities that black viewers identified as positive even when they were held up to scorn—honesty, studiousness and dedication to education, and respect for his parents.

=== Bel-Air ===
Carlton Banks is played by Jelani Talib in the 2019 short film Bel-Air, a reimagining of the original show as a modern drama. In September 2020, a two-season series based on the short film was picked up by the streaming service Peacock, with Will Smith as an executive producer commenting on his excitement to explore the characters in this format, specifically referencing "[t]he Carlton character, a Black young Republican, modern day? The heat that will be stirred up between these characters". Olly Sholotan was cast as Carlton in the actual reboot, described in one review as "not the same nerdy Alfonso Ribeiro with a token funny dance. He's almost cool—with toned biceps and a friend circle comprised of lacrosse players".

== The Carlton ==
Carlton in the original series was known for frequently dancing a specific set of steps to Tom Jones' "It's Not Unusual", a dance routine that gained fame as "The Carlton". Ribeiro developed the dance, later claiming to have drawn inspiration from the appearance by Courteney Cox in the 1984 music video for Bruce Springsteen's "Dancing in the Dark", and by Eddie Murphy depicting white people dancing in Eddie Murphy Raw. On May 24, 2013, Ribeiro made a cameo appearance on The Graham Norton Show to perform "The Carlton", with show guests Will and Jaden Smith. Ribeiro incorporated the dance into his performance for week four of season 19 of Dancing with the Stars, earning the only perfect 10 of the episode, along the way to winning the season.

=== Lawsuit ===
In December 2018, NBC and CBS reported that Ribeiro, along with Instagram star Russell Horning, aka Backpack Kid, and rapper Terrence Ferguson, aka 2 Milly, brought a lawsuit against Epic Games for their decision to feature respective choreographies in the popular game Fortnite. "The Carlton" was one of the many dances that Fortnite players can purchase for their avatars. Epic Games declined to comment on the lawsuits. The U.S. Copyright Office denied him a copyright for his dance in January 2019. The Copyright Office described the contested work as "a simple routine made up of three dance steps, the first of which is popularly known as 'The Carlton'", describing the steps for the entire routine as follows:

The dancer sways their hips as they step from side to side, while swinging their arms in an exaggerated manner. In the second dance step, the dancer takes two steps to each side while opening and closing their legs and their arms in unison. In the final step, the dancer's feet are still and they lower one hand from above their head to the middle of their chest while fluttering their fingers.

In March 2019, Ribeiro dropped the lawsuit against Epic Games.
