= Simone Joy Jones =

American actress

- Born: March 15, 1999 (age 27); Greensboro, North Carolina
- Occupation: Actress, singer
- Years active: 2011–present

Simone Joy Jones is an American actress and singer. She is best known for playing Lisa Wilkes in the drama series Bel Air and Tanya Crandell in the comedy film Don't Tell Mom the Babysitter's Dead.

== Early life ==
Jones was born in Greensboro, North Carolina to army veterans turned real estate agents Mona Lisa and Sean Jones. When she was young her family moved to San Antonio, Texas where she attended Eisenhower Middle School and Winston Churchill High School. She graduated from Carnegie Mellon University in 2021 where she received the 2021 John Arthur Kennedy Award for Excellence in Acting or Music Theater.

== Career ==
Jones made her on-screen debut portraying Young Vicky in the 2011 crime thriller film The Son of No One starring Al Pacino and Channing Tatum. She made appearances in the crime drama series American Rust and the comedy drama series The Chair. She rose to worldwide fame playing Lisa Wilkes, the love interest of a young Will Smith in the drama series Bel Air. In 2024 she played the lead role of Tanya Crandell in the comedy film Don't Tell Mom the Babysitter's Dead.

== Personal life ==
Outside of acting Jones is also a talented singer and in 2025 dropped her debut album Magnet under the alias S!MONE.

== Filmography ==
=== Film ===
Year	Title	Role	Notes
2011	The Son of No One	Young Vicky	
2022	Anything's Possible	Megan	
2024	Don't Tell Mom the Babysitter's Dead	Tanya Crandell	

=== Television ===
Year	Title	Role	Notes
2021	The Chair	Joy	2 episodes
2021	American Rust	Coed	Episode; Blue Mountains
2022-2025	Bel-Air	Lisa Wilkes	35 episodes
