= Hunter Hunted (band) =

American indie pop band

- Origin: Los Angeles, California, U.S.
- Genres: Indie pop
- Years active: 2012–present
- Members: Michael Garner; Daniel Chang

Hunter Hunted is an American indie pop band from Los Angeles, California. The group is composed of Michael Garner (keyboards, vocals) and Dan Chang (bass, vocals). The group's music, described as melodic dance infused pop, spans many genres.

== History ==
Garner and Chang formed the group in December 2012 after the dissolution of their former band Lady Danville. KCRW DJs Chris Douridas and Jason Kramer soon began playing their song "Keep Together", as did KCSN DJ/LA Buzz Band blogger Kevin Bronson. The band went on to play their first show, at the Troubadour in Los Angeles. With the support of the newfound radio and blog buzz the show sold out a week in advance.

After the success of the Troubadour show, the band was asked to play on Conan O'Brien's late-night show on February 27. The band then headlined a KROQ presented residency at The Bootleg Theater in the month of March. In the middle of the residency the band travelled to the SXSW festival in Austin, Texas to perform at the Paradigm Agency showcase as well as Nokia/Rocnation's Raptor House party.

After the group finished their Los Angeles residency, they flew to New York City where they sold out the Mercury Lounge. The band then did an East Coast run with Family of the Year and The Mowgli's. After those dates, the band headed out on tour with Fitz and the Tantrums, playing shows in the Midwest, the South and Northeast.

The group was then named by Billboard's Scouting Report as well as MTV as an artist to Watch. Following these accolades, the band was flown to New York by A&M/Octone Records to showcase for the label. The band signed with the label in June 2013. During summer of 2013, the band went on tour with Weezer, Fitz and the Tantrums, The Mowgli's and American Authors, and made stops at Summerfest in Milwaukee and Neon Gold's Popshop in Los Angeles.

In October 2013, the band went on tour with FUN. On October 29 the band performed alongside Ashton Kutcher in Lenovo's livestream. That same month Starbucks chose their song "End of the World" as Pick of the Week.

In December, they performed alongside Victoria's Secret models Lily Alridge and Martha Hunt at the Victoria's Secret Fashion Show pre-show They were also featured on the cover of Dlist Magazine's Winter issue

The single "Lucky Day" from the album Ready for You (2015), written by Dustin Paul, Ben Antellis, David Veslocki, Robby Tal, Michael Garner, and Daniel Chang, was featured in Sperry's Shoes 2015 Top-Sider advertising campaign.

== Discography ==
=== Studio albums ===
- Ready for You (2015)

=== EPs ===
- Hunter Hunted (2013)
