= Akira Akbar =

American actress and model

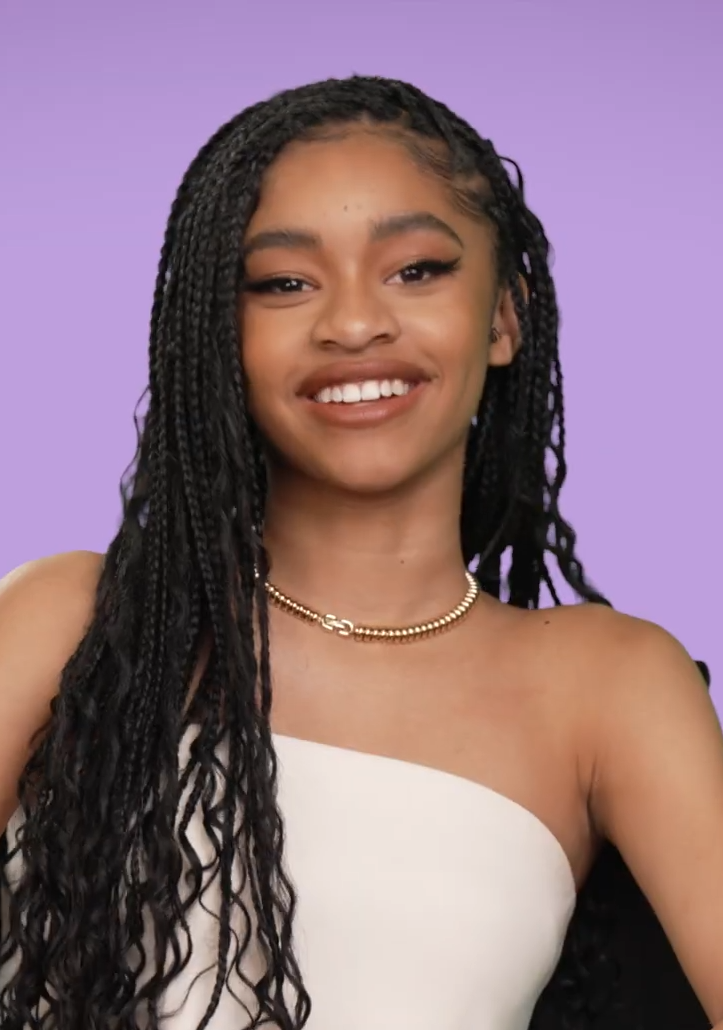
- Akira Akbar In 2023
- Born: Akira Jolie Akbar; October 2, 2006 (age 20); United States
- Occupations: Actress; model
- Years active: 2015–present
- Known for: Captain Marvel; Bel-Air; We Can Be Heroes

Akira Akbar (born October 2, 2006) is an American actress and model. She began her career as a Child actress, appearing in television series including Criminal Minds, Grey's Anatomy, This Is Us and Girl Meets World. She gained wider recognition for portraying the young version of Monica Rambeau in the 2019 superhero film Captain Marvel.

Akbar has since appeared in films including We Can Be Heroes (2020) and has had recurring roles as Ashley Banks in the Peacock drama series Bel-Air and Power Book IV: Force.

== Early life and education ==
Akira Jolie Akbar was born on October 2, 2006, in the United States. Her parents are stylist Kitty Wedie and Kenyon Rambo and has three siblings, including actress and model Azari Akbar. Akbar began as a child model before transitioning into acting after her mother noticed her interest in performing and encouraged her to audition for acting roles. While pursuing her acting career, she continued her education, attending a private school.

== Career ==
Akbar began her acting career in 2015 with a guest appearance on the CBS crime drama Criminal Minds. She later went on to land guest-roles in multiple television shows such as, Grey's Anatomy, This Is Us and Good Trouble while also working as a child model before transitioning to television and film full time.

In April 2019, Akbar signed with ICM Partners for representation. That same year, Akbar made her feature film debut as the 11-year-old Monica Rambeau in the Marvel Studios superhero film Captain Marvel, appearing alongside Brie Larson and Lashana Lynch. Her portrayal introduced the younger version of the character, who later became a recurring figure in the Marvel Cinematic Universe.

She later appeared in the Netflix superhero film We Can Be Heroes(2020).

Since 2022, Akbar has portrayed Ashley Banks in Peacock's drama series Bel-Air, a reimagining of the sitcom The Fresh Prince of Bel-Air.

== Filmography ==
=== Film ===
Year	Title	Role	Notes
2019	Captain Marvel	Monica Rambeau (11 years old)	Feature film
2020	We Can Be Heroes	Fast Forward	
2022	Love You Anyway	Young Mackenzie	

=== Television ===
Year	Title	Role	Notes
2015	Criminal Minds	Daughter	Episode: "The Sandman"
2017	Grey's Anatomy	Amethyst Vasquez	Episode: "Only Mama Knows"
2019	This Is Us	Young Beth	Episode: "Our Little Island Girl"
2019–2020	Family Reunion	Brooke	2 episodes
2021	Good Trouble	Kiara	3 episodes
2022–2025	Bel-Air	Ashley Banks	Main role; 36 episodes

== Awards and nominations ==
Year	Award	Category	Result	Ref.
2022	BET Awards	BET YoungStars Award	Nominated	
2023	BET Awards	BET YoungStars Award	Nominated	
2024	BET Awards	BET YoungStars Award	Nominated	
2025	America's Rainbow Film Festival	Pride Award – Best Supporting Actress in a Motion Picture or Series/Mini Series	Nominated	
