= Lady Danville =

American indie pop band

- Origin: Westwood, Los Angeles, California
- Genres: Indie pop
- Years active: 2007–2012
- Label: unsigned
- Members: Michael Garner; Daniel Chang; Matthew Frankel
- Website: lady danville on Facebook

Lady Danville was a Los Angeles–based indie pop band that officially formed in 2007 and disbanded in 2012.

== History ==
Michael Garner (keys, vocals), Matt Frankel (percussion, vocals) and Dan Chang (guitar, vocals) met at UCLA in 2005 while singing together in the premiere collegiate music group Awaken A Cappella.

In 2006, under the name of Mikey G and Dan from Danville, Michael and Dan took part as a duo in UCLA's Spring Sing talent competition, the school's oldest music tradition, where they won with their song “Cast Away” for Best Duet and Best Overall Entry. Past winners have included Sara Bareilles and Tyrone Wells. In the beginning of 2007, the duo sought out Matthew Frankel, ultimately leading to the inception of Lady Danville.

In the fall of 2007, Lady Danville won the annual Star 98.7 Lounge Contest with their song “Tired Magician” and was featured on the Star Lounge Compilation CD with artists including John Mayer, Maroon 5 and Pink. In December 2007, the group released their first self-titled EP "Lady Danville" which can be found on iTunes and Amazon. The band spent 2008 establishing themselves in the Los Angeles area at venues such as The Troubadour, Viper Room, Hotel Café, and The El Rey before going on tour in the Pacific Northwest in 2009 and the entire West Coast in 2010 with the bands Until June and The Fold. In March 2010, Lady Danville wrapped up their West Coast Tour and headed to Austin, Texas, where they played at the official SXSW 2010 Showcase with a total of five shows in three days. In April 2010, they kicked off their East Coast tour with Jack's Mannequin. Additionally, Lady Danville did a benefit concert at Annandale High School solely for class of 2011 in late October 2010 whilst touring the east coast.

Other accolades include the prominent feature of their song “Cast Away“ on a recent episode of MTV's The Real World: Washington DC as well as “Love to Love” on E!’s Keeping up with the Kardashians and MTV's The Real World: New Orleans. Furthermore, their music has been consistently featured on Dorm Life, Hulu’s most watched web show, as well as on the acclaimed independent documentary Craigslist Joe. They have also earned tremendous praise from media outlets as diverse as LA Weekly, LAist.com, and Billboard.com.

In November 2010, Lady Danville finished the Lonely Avenue tour with Ben Folds. In January 2011, the band went on tour with Dashboard Confessional, and Chris Conley of Saves the Day for the west coast leg of the 10th Year Anniversary of Dashboard Confessionals debut album The Swiss Army Romance.

Due to one of their main members leaving the band and the name of the band changing, they have officially become a new band and Lady Danville now ceases to exist. On October 27, 2012, Lady Danville put the following statement about the band breaking up on their official Facebook page: "It is with extremely heavy hearts that we announce we have recently parted ways with our drummer and friend, Matt Frankel. Matt has been an integral part of Lady Danville, and we will miss him deeply. Out of respect for him and his contribution, we will be announcing a change in our band name shortly." They also announced that their first and only full-length album was to be released on February 12, 2013, but that never ended up happening, at least under the Lady Danville name.

== Hunter Hunted ==
Because of the band breakup and band name change from Lady Danville to Hunter Hunted, the full-length album was never released. Instead, Hunter Hunted released a self-titled EP consisting of five tracks, including "Operating" which had already been performed many times as Lady Danville. The band is fronted by Michael Garner and Dan Chang, but consists of a total of six band members, including Blake Straus. They toured between February and July 2013, promoting their new EP. In that time, they released a music video for "End of the World," occupied a residency at the Bootleg Theatre for the month of March, appeared on Conan, and charted No. 1 on Billboard's Next Big Sound Chart.

== Lady Danville members ==
- Michael Garner – Piano, vocals (2005–2012)
- Daniel Chang – Guitar, vocals (2005–2012)
- Matthew Frankel – Cajon, drums, vocals (2006–October 2012)

== Discography ==
- 2007 Star Lounge Compilation (2007)
- Lady Danville EP (2007)
- Lady Danville Tour EP (2010)
- Operating EP (2012)
