= Tara Ison =

American writer (born 1964)

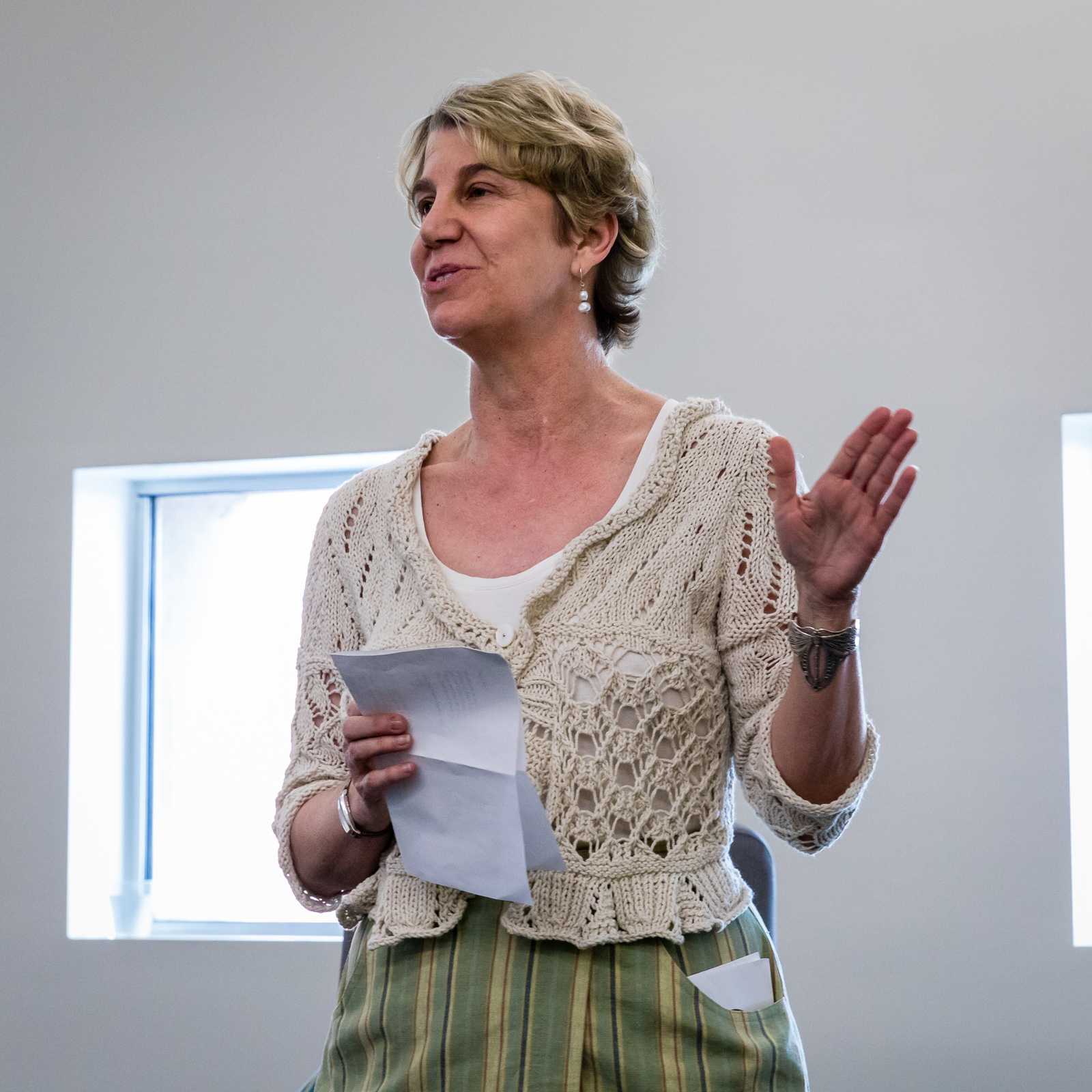
- Tara Ison in 2018 at Arizona State University
- Born: 1964 (age 61–62)
- Occupations: Novelist; short story writer; essayist; screenwriter

Academic background
- Education: Bennington College (MFA)

Academic work
- Institutions: Washington University in St. Louis; Northwestern University; Ohio State University; Goddard College; Antioch University Los Angeles; UC Riverside; Arizona State University
- Notable works: Reeling Through Life: How I Learned To Live, Love & Die at the Movies (2015); Don't Tell Mom the Babysitter's Dead (co-wrote, 1991)
- Website: taraison.com

Tara Ison (born 1964) is an American novelist, short story writer, and essayist.

She is the author of three novels: Rockaway (Soft Skull Press, 2013), The List (Scribner, 2007), and A Child out of Alcatraz (Faber & Faber, 1997), which was a Finalist for the Los Angeles Times Book Prize. A collection of essays, Reeling Through Life: How I Learned To Live, Love & Die at the Movies, was published by Soft Skull Press in January 2015, and was the winner of the 2015 PEN Southwest Award for Creative Nonfiction. Her short story collection, Ball, was published by Soft Skull Press in Fall 2015. She received a National Endowment for the Arts Fellowship in 2020 in support of a short story collection tentatively titled "The Meat Bee," after her 2018 story published in Tin House. Her most recent novel, At the Hour Between Dog and Wolf (IG Publishing) was published in 2023 and was a New York Times Editors' Choice recommendation.

== Work ==
Ison received her MFA in Fiction & Literature from Bennington College, where she was a student of Rick Moody. Institutions she has taught creative writing and screenwriting at include Washington University in St. Louis, Northwestern University, Ohio State University, Goddard College and Antioch University Los Angeles. In addition, she has taught UC Riverside Palm Desert's MFA in Creative Writing program. Presently, she is a Professor of English at Arizona State University. She also is faculty of New England College's MFA program.

Work by Ison has appeared in Tin House, Salon, O, The Oprah Magazine, Electric Literature, The Kenyon Review, The Rumpus, Nerve, Black Clock, TriQuarterly, The Santa Monica Review, PMS: poemmemoirstory, Publishers Weekly, The Week, The Mississippi Review, LA Weekly, the Los Angeles Times, the San Francisco Chronicle, the Chicago Tribune, the San Jose Mercury News, and numerous anthologies.

She is also the co-writer, with Neil Landau, of the 1991 cult classic movie Don't Tell Mom the Babysitter's Dead. The pair had originally written the script in 1987.

== Awards and honors ==
Ison is the recipient of National Endowment for the Arts Creative Writing Fellowships in 2020 and 2008, and a 2008 COLA Individual Artist Grant, as well as multiple Yaddo fellowships, a Rotary Foundation Scholarship for International Study, a Brandeis National Women's Committee Award, a Thurber House Fiction Writer-in-Residence Fellowship, the Simon Blattner Fellowship from Northwestern University, and a California Arts Council Artists' Fellowship Award.

== Books ==
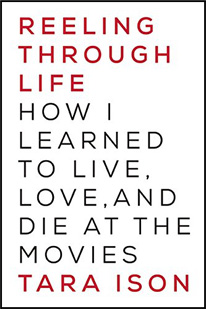
Cover of Reeling Through Life

- Ball: Stories
- Reeling Through Life: How I Learned to Live, Love, and Die at the Movies' Winner, 2015 PEN Southwest Award for Creative Nonfiction
- A Child out of Alcatraz
- The List
- Rockaway
- At the Hour Between Dog and Wolf

== Screenwriting ==
=== Television ===
Year	Title	Episode	Network
1990	Doogie Howser, M.D.	'Nautilus for Naught'	ABC
1996	Ace Ventura: Pet Detective	'Remembrance of Trunks Past'	CBS

=== Film ===
Year	Title	Director
1991	Don't Tell Mom the Babysitter's Dead (with Neil Landau)	Stephen Herek
