= Bel-Air (TV series) =

2022 American drama television series

- Genre: Drama
- Based on: The Fresh Prince of Bel-Air by Andy Borowitz & Susan Borowitz; A format by Benny Medina & Jeff Pollack
- Developed by: Morgan Cooper & Malcolm Spellman & TJ Brady & Rasheed Newson
- Showrunners: TJ Brady & Rasheed Newson; Carla Banks Waddles
- Starring: Jabari Banks; Cassandra Freeman; Jimmy Akingbola; Olly Sholotan; Coco Jones; Akira Akbar; Simone Joy Jones; Jordan L. Jones; Adrian Holmes
- Music by: Terrace Martin; Robert Glasper; Jacob Yoffee; Roahn Hylton
- Opening theme: "Deja Vu" by Easy McCoy featuring TYuS
- Country of origin: United States
- Original language: English
- No. of seasons: 4
- No. of episodes: 38

Production
- Executive producers: TJ Brady & Rasheed Newson; Morgan Cooper; Will Smith; Terence Carter; James Lassiter; Miguel Melendez; Malcolm Spellman; Benny Medina; Quincy Jones; Andy Borowitz & Susan Borowitz; Carla Banks Waddles; Anthony Sparks; JaNeika James & JaSheika James
- Producers: Jeff Rafner; Douglas S. Ornstein; John Vohlers
- Cinematography: James Hawkinson; Christopher Soos; Keith L. Smith; Andrew Strahorn
- Editors: Jennifer Barbot; Christopher S. Capp; Angela Latimer; Shoshanah Tanzer; Mark Heiliger; Marc Wiltshire; Kendra Pasker; Nicole Vaskell; Stefanie Visser; Alex Wills
- Running time: 40–60 minutes
- Production companies: Arbolada Roads; Ra Shines Inc.; Cooper Films; The 51; Westbrook Studios; Universal Television; Babycakes Productions; Blasé

Original release
- Network: Peacock
- Release: February 13, 2022 – December 8, 2025

Bel-Air is an American drama television series developed by Morgan Cooper, Malcolm Spellman, TJ Brady, and Rasheed Newson. It is a reimagined version of the sitcom The Fresh Prince of Bel-Air and is based on Cooper's short fan film of the same title. It stars Jabari Banks, Adrian Holmes, Cassandra Freeman, Olly Sholotan, Coco Jones, Akira Akbar, Jimmy Akingbola, Jordan L. Jones, and Simone Joy Jones. The series premiered on Peacock on February 13, 2022, and concluded on December 8, 2025, with 38 episodes broadcast over four seasons. The second season was released on February 23, 2023. In March 2023, the series was renewed for a third season which premiered on August 15, 2024. In December 2024, the series was renewed for a fourth and final season which premiered on November 24, 2025.

== Premise ==
The series follows Will Smith's complicated journey from the streets of West Philadelphia to the gated mansions of Bel-Air. It dives deep into racial tension, culture shock, and the elitist world of the black bourgeoisie.

== Cast and characters ==
=== Main ===
- Jabari Banks as Will Smith, a 16-year-old born and raised in West Philadelphia who is sent to live with his aunt and uncle in Bel-Air by his mother, Vy
- Cassandra Freeman as Vivian Banks, Will's aunt, wife of Philip and sister of Vy
- Jimmy Akingbola as Geoffrey Thompson, the House Manager of the Bankses, originally from Jamaica before moving to London as a child
- Olly Sholotan as Carlton Banks, the lacrosse-playing middle child of Viv and Phil, and Will's cousin
- Coco Jones as Hilary Banks, a social media influencer, excellent chef and eldest child of Viv and Phil and Will's cousin
- Akira Akbar as Ashley Banks, the 12-year-old youngest child of Viv and Phil and Will's cousin
- Simone Joy Jones as Lisa Wilkes, a potential love interest of Will, and Carlton's ex. She is also on the swim team.
- Jordan L. Jones as Jazz, a taxi driver Will met and bonded with when he arrived at LAX. He also owns a record store and has a crush on Hilary.
- Adrian Holmes as Philip Banks, Will's lawyer uncle, husband of Viv

=== Recurring ===
- April Parker Jones as Viola "Vy" Smith, Will's mother
- SteVonté Hart as Tray Melbert, Will's former best friend in Philadelphia
- Tyler Barnhardt as Connor Satterfield, Carlton's best friend during season 1 but later stopped the friendship due to Connor's behavior
- Joe Holt as Fred Wilkes, Lisa's father and the Chief of the Los Angeles Police Department
- Charlie Hall as Tyler Laramy, Will's friend and basketball teammate at Bel-Air Academy
- Wendy Davis as Joan
- Jon Beavers as Kylo
- Michael Ealy as Reid Broderick
- Karrueche Tran as Ivy
- Tatyana Ali as Mrs. Hughes (season 2), (Note: Tatyana Ali is credited as "Special Guest Star" but is a recurring cast member.) Ashley's English literature teacher at Bel-Air Academy. Ali portrayed "Ashley Banks" in the original series.
- Reno Wilson as James Lewis (season 2)
- Brooklyn McLinn as Doc Hightower (seasons 2–4)
- Jazlyn Martin as Jackie (seasons 2–4)
- Riele Downs as Yazmin (season 2)
- Nicholas Duvernay as Drew (seasons 2–4)
- Shelley Robertson as Ms. Bassin (season 2)
- Justin Cornwell as Lamarcus Alton (seasons 2–3)
- Diandra Lyle as Erika Baker (seasons 2–4)
- Joivan Wade as Fredrick Thompson (seasons 2–3)
- Vic Mensa as Quentin (season 3)
- Alycia Pascual-Peña as Amira (seasons 3–4), Carlton's rehab classmate turned new girlfriend
- B.J. Minor as Spencer (season 3), the group leader at the Young Adult Narcotics Anonymous meeting that Carlton goes to
- Dulé Hill as Omar Campbell (season 3)
- Akilah Walker as Yolanda Porter (season 3)
- Lenora Crichlow as Penelope (season 3)
- Michael Govan Hackett as Eli (seasons 3–4)

In addition, Aimee Li and Andi Rene Christensen costar as Phanta and Monica (two of Hilary's influencer housemates), with Al-Shabazz Jabateh also costarring as Hudson for the second season.

=== Special guest stars ===
- Daphne Maxwell Reid as Janice (seasons 1 and 2), the executive director of the Art Council. Reid previously was the second actress to portray Vivian Banks in the original series. Also in the original series, Janice was the name of Vivian's youngest sister.
- Vernee Watson-Johnson as Helen (season 1), another board member of the Art Council. Watson-Johnson previously portrayed Viola 'Vy' Smith in the original series. Also in the original series, Helen was the name of Vivian, Vy and Janice's sister
- Marlon Wayans as Lou (seasons 1, 3, and 4), Will's father who he thought abandoned his mother
- Joseph Marcell as Roman (season 3), a gangster from London who had a criminal past with Geoffrey. Marcell played the butler Geoffrey in the original series.
- Caroline Chikezie as Dominique Warren (season 4) the crime boss of Geoffrey's former London gang
- Tyra Banks as Regina Baxter (season 4), Vivian's former sorority sister, a former congresswoman, and the current 31st national president of the Delta Pi Gamma. Banks played Will's ex-girlfriend Jackie in season 4 of the original series.
- Janet Hubert as Iris (season 4). Hubert previously was the first actress to portray Vivian Banks in the original series.
- Will Smith as older Will (season 4)

== Episodes ==
=== Series overview ===
Season	Episodes	Originally released	
Season	Episodes	First released	Last released
1	10	February 13, 2022	March 31, 2022
2	10	February 23, 2023	April 27, 2023
3	10	August 15, 2024	September 5, 2024
4	8	November 24, 2025	December 8, 2025

=== Season 1 (2022) ===
No. overall	No. in season	Title	Directed by	Written by	Original release date
1	1	"Dreams and Nightmares"	Morgan Cooper	Morgan Cooper & Malcolm Spellman & TJ Brady & Rasheed Newson	February 13, 2022
West Philadelphia straight-A student Will Smith has a high chance of winning a college basketball scholarship. After a game, he and friend Tray are insulted by gang member Darnell and make a bet with drug lord Rashad. Will and Tray win, but Darnell instigates a fight by throwing a basketball at Rashad's head, making it seem like Will threw it. When Rashad and his crew gang up on Tray, Will clears the court by firing Tray's unregistered gun into the air and is arrested. Will's mother and her brother-in-law Philip Banks get him released and flown to Bel Air, Los Angeles to live with Philip. Will hitches a ride with local Jazz and goes to a fundraiser for Phil's District Attorney campaign. There, Will flirts with Lisa, his cousin Carlton's ex-girlfriend. Will later nearly starts a fight when Connor, Carlton's white teammate at lacrosse, raps ethnic slurs. Will eventually catches Carlton sniffing Xanax and agrees to stay silent if he helps get Phil to ease up on him. At Connor's beach party, Will kisses Lisa. Jealous, Carlton pushes Will into the pool. Will cannot swim, so Lisa pulls him out. He then punches Connor and Carlton.
2	2	"Keep Ya Head Up"	Carl Seaton	JaNeika James & JaSheika James	February 13, 2022
Will gets a call from his mother saying that his friend Tray was shot. Will attends his first day at Bel-Air Academy and is humiliated in front of the entire Junior Class by Carlton. Uncle Phil is interviewed on a Radio Show by Big Boy and asked more questions about his personal life than political. Phil's daughter Hilary gets an offer from Haute Magazine on the condition that she tone down her recipes and outfits. With the help of Jazz, Uncle Phil, and Tyler's advice, Will is able to get a spot on the basketball team, but while leaving campus his bag is searched and Connor planted cocaine in his bag.
3	3	"Yamacraw"	Nick Copus	Yolonda Lawrence	February 13, 2022
After what happened at school, Will has in-school suspension. However, Phil and his wife Vivian learn that the Principal did not watch the tapes of who planted the drugs in Will's bag. After things get sorted out and returned at school, Phil invites Will to a crawfish boil event where his fraternity host.
4	4	"Canvass"	Dale Stern	Nicole Delaney & Henry "Hank" Jones	February 17, 2022
Phil convinces his daughters (Ashley and Hilary), his son Carlton and Will to get fifty people to register to vote. He makes a deal with Carlton that if he does not make drama with Will, he will get VIP seats to the Grand Prix at Monaco. Tray informs Will that Rashad now knows that he is in Bel-Air, which leads to house manager Geoffrey helping. He learns from Hilary that Carlton made a deal with Phil which leads him to make a deal with Vivian that if he does not make drama with Carlton, they can fly Tray out for the weekend, which she accepts.
5	5	"PA to LA"	Tasha Smith	Ephraim Salaam & Rasheed Newson	February 24, 2022
Tray visits Bel-Air, following the deal Will had with Vivian. At the Bankses', the family supports Hilary by hosting an influencer event at the Bankses' residence. Tray's loyalty is put to test, as he shares Will's secret with Carlton, while tipsy at the dinner table. Carlton speaks with Phil and confronts Will with a new rule or he will snitch on him.
6	6	"The Strength to Smile"	Aurora Guerrero	TJ Brady & Paul Eriksen	March 3, 2022
Tray's return to West Philadelphia leaves Will distraught. He also starts being trolled on social media. Viv is hosting a fundraiser to raise money for lupus research and honor the memory of her sorority sister and best friend Gayle. At the event, Ashley tries hard to impress Lucia. Reid comes to the event, and that ruffles Phil. Knowing what Broderick is up to, Phil urges Geoffrey to watch Reid. Phil also loses a campaign endorsement because Fred joined the race as an opponent. Fred's first wife Gayle died in 2019, and his new wife, Angela, met him in 2018 at an LAPD golf tournament. Viv ponders whether or not Fred was cheating on Gayle the entire time. Lisa has planned a poetry reading with Carlton for the event honoring her mother Gayle, and confided in him that she does not trust Angela, who Lisa feels wanted to replace her mom. In a drug-fueled breakdown, Carlton accuses Will of betraying him before apologizing. Will offers to step in for his heartbroken cousin during Lisa's reading. While talking with Will and Vivian, Angela inadvertently reveals she was having an affair with Fred. Furious, Vivian confronts Angela, who leaves with Fred.
7	7	"Payback's a B*tch"	Ava Berkofsky	Carla Banks Waddles	March 10, 2022
8	8	"No One Wins When the Family Feuds"	Sylvain White	JaNeika James & JaSheika James	March 17, 2022
9	9	"Can't Knock the Hustle"	Matthew A. Cherry	Malcolm Spellman & Rasheed Newson	March 24, 2022
10	10	"Where To?"	Dale Stern	Morgan Cooper & TJ Brady & Rasheed Newson	March 31, 2022
Will finally meets his father face to face and asks him why he left him and his mother. Lou tries to make it sound like he was incarcerated for something that wasn't his fault, but it becomes evident that he felt emasculated by Philip's wealth and had desperately tried to make his own fortune the wrong way. When that didn't work out, Lou started blaming Vy for being "too demanding" and calls their marriage the biggest mistake of his life. Enraged, Will physically retaliates and Lou almost strangles him until Philip and Vivian intervene and kick Lou out. Feeling like his world is falling apart, Will runs away and meets up with Jazz, who asks him where he wants to go from here.

=== Season 2 (2023) ===
No. overall	No. in season	Title	Directed by	Written by	Original release date
11	1	"A Fresh Start"	Dale Stern	Carla Banks Waddles	February 23, 2023
12	2	"Speaking Truth"	Anton Cropper	Anthony Sparks	March 2, 2023
13	3	"Compromised"	Michael Weaver	TJ Brady & Rasheed Newson	March 9, 2023
14	4	"Don't Kill My Vibe"	Dawn Wilkinson	Ephraim Salaam & Justin Calen-Chenn	March 16, 2023
15	5	"Excellence Is Everywhere"	Keesha Sharp	Tawnya Bhattacharya & Ali Laventhol	March 23, 2023
16	6	"Let the Best Man Win"	Stacey Muhammad	Nambi E. Kelley & Julian Johnson	March 30, 2023
17	7	"Under Pressure"	John S. Scott	Anthony Sparks	April 6, 2023
18	8	"Pursuit of Happiness"	Nick Copus	Ali Laventhol & Tawnya Bhattacharya	April 13, 2023
19	9	"Just Like Old Times"	Tasha Smith	JaNeika James & JaSheika James	April 20, 2023
20	10	"Don't Look Back"	Dale Stern	Carla Banks Waddles & Daniela Gaj	April 27, 2023

=== Season 3 (2024) ===
No. overall	No. in season	Title	Directed by	Written by	Original release date
21	1	"Baby, I'm Back"	Keesha Sharp	JaNeika James & JaSheika James	August 15, 2024
22	2	"Pivot"	John S. Scott	Des Moran	August 15, 2024
23	3	"True Colors"	Nick Copus	Carla Banks Waddles & Julian Johnson	August 15, 2024
24	4	"Out All Night"	Nick Copus	Felicia Pride	August 22, 2024
25	5	"Getting Personal"	Keesha Sharp	Andy Reaser & Ephraim Salaam	August 22, 2024
26	6	"Baggage"	Morgan Cooper	Justin Calen-Chenn & Colin Waite	August 22, 2024
27	7	"Black Lotus"	Mo McRae	Des Moran & Felicia Pride	August 29, 2024
28	8	"Gimme a Break"	Rachel Raimist	Andy Reaser	August 29, 2024
29	9	"Family Matters"	Christine Swanson	JaNeika James & JaSheika James	September 5, 2024
30	10	"Save the Best for Last"	Nick Copus	Carla Banks Waddles	September 5, 2024

=== Season 4 (2025) ===
No. overall	No. in season	Title	Directed by	Written by	Original release date
31	1	"The Maybes"	Nick Copus	Felicia Pride	November 24, 2025
After an eventful summer, Will and Carlton begin their senior year at Bel-Air academy, which forces them to start thinking about their futures. Hilary continues to cope with the loss of Lamarcus. Still pregnant, Vivian struggles to tell the family of the news. Phillip continues to look for Jeffery.
32	2	"Be a Kid"	Nick Copus	Des Moran	November 24, 2025
33	3	"What Are You Doing for Thanksgiving?"	Keesha Sharp	Shukree Tilghman	November 24, 2025
34	4	"Brother's Keeper"	Keesha Sharp	Wade Allain-Marcus	December 1, 2025
35	5	"Gorilla Glue and Duct Tape"	Tina Mabry	Colin Waite	December 1, 2025
36	6	"Your Crown Is Waiting"	Tina Mabry	Julian Johnson	December 8, 2025
37	7	"Soulmates"	Morgan Stevenson Cooper	Des Moran & Felicia Pride	December 8, 2025
38	8	"The Next Act"	Morgan Stevenson Cooper	Carla Banks Waddles	December 8, 2025

== Production ==
=== Development ===
On March 10, 2019, Morgan Cooper uploaded Bel-Air to YouTube. The submission was a fan film, written and directed by him, in the form of a mock trailer for an updated and dramatic reimagining of the television sitcom The Fresh Prince of Bel-Air. Will Smith, who starred on the original sitcom as a fictionalized version of himself, heavily praised the fan film and expressed his interest in expanding the concept into a reboot, personally meeting with Cooper. On August 11, 2020, the series was officially announced after being in the works for over a year. At the time, Netflix, HBO Max, and Peacock were bidding for the rights to the series. On September 8, 2020, Peacock gave the series a two-season order under the title Bel-Air, with Westbrook Inc. and Universal Television producing. Smith and Cooper executive produce alongside Terence Carter, James Lassiter, Miguel Melendez, Malcolm Spellman, Quincy Jones, Benny Medina, Andy Borowitz, and Susan Borowitz. Upon the streaming records announcement, it was reported that Anthony Sparks joined the series as an executive producer for the second season. On October 13, 2022, it was announced that Carla Banks Waddles has been promoted to executive producer and showrunner for the second season, replacing TJ Brady & Rasheed Newson, who were the showrunners for the first season. Banks Waddles was a co-executive producer for the first season. On March 17, 2023, Peacock renewed the series for a third season. On December 3, 2024, Peacock renewed the series for an eight-episode fourth and final season.

=== Casting ===
In August 2021, Smith surprised Jabari Banks with the news that Banks would star as the lead. In September 2021, Adrian Holmes, Cassandra Freeman, Olly Sholotan, Coco Jones, Akira Akbar, Jimmy Akingbola, Jordan L. Jones, and Simone Joy Jones joined the cast as series regulars. In January 2022, Karrueche Tran, Duane Martin, Joe Holt, April Parker Jones, SteVonté Hart, Scottie Thompson, and Charlie Hall in recurring roles. In March 2022, it was reported that Daphne Maxwell Reid and Vernee Watson-Johnson guest starred in episode 9 on March 24. On January 12, 2023, it was announced that Saweetie is set to make a cameo appearance as herself while Brooklyn McLinn, Jazlyn Martin, and Riele Downs were cast in recurring capacities for the second season. A week later, it was reported that Tatyana Ali who played Ashley Banks in The Fresh Prince of Bel-Air was cast in a recurring role for the second season. On February 21, 2023, Al-Shabazz Jabateh, Nicholas Duvernay, Diandra Lyle, Justin Cornwell, and Reno Wilson joined the cast in recurring capacities for the second season. On September 24, 2025, Tyra Banks was cast to guest star for the fourth season. On October 27, 2025, Janet Hubert who played the original Aunt Viv in The Fresh Prince of Bel-Air and Caroline Chikezie joined the cast as guest stars for the fourth season.

=== Filming ===
Principal photography was scheduled to take place in Los Angeles and Philadelphia. On January 7, 2022, it was reported that the series had some positive COVID-19 tests on set, but production was not impacted.

== Release ==
An online premiere for the series was held on February 9, 2022, by Crown & Conquer. The series premiered on Peacock on February 13, 2022, with its first three episodes. The second season premiered on February 23, 2023. The third season was released on August 15, 2024, with three new episodes, followed by three episodes on August 22, and two episodes each on August 29 and September 5. The fourth and final season premiered on November 24, 2025, with three new episodes, followed by two episodes on December 1, and three episodes each on December 8.

== Reception ==
=== Critical response ===
On the review aggregator website Rotten Tomatoes, the first season holds an approval rating of 66% based 47 critic reviews, with an average rating on 6.2/10. The website's critics consensus reads, "Bel-Air replaces its predecessor's high spirits with a dour tone and an uneasy mix of realism, although there are signs that this reimagining can grow into a fresh new spin." Metacritic, which uses a weighted average, assigned a score of 59 out of 100 based on 25 critics, indicating "mixed or average reviews".

The second season has a 90% approval rating on Rotten Tomatoes, based on 10 critic reviews, with an average rating of 6.7/10. On Metacritic, the second season received a score of 71 based on reviews from 4 critics, indicating "generally favorable reviews.

On May 2, 2022, Peacock announced that Bel-Air was the most-streamed original series on the streaming service, reaching 8 million accounts to date.

=== Accolades ===
Association	Year	Category	Recipient(s)	Result	Ref.
AAFCA TV Honors	2022	Best New Show	Bel-Air	Won	
AAFCA TV Honors	2025	Best Ensemble	The cast of Bel-Air	Won	
Astra TV Awards	2024	Best Writing in a Streaming Series, Drama	Carla Banks Waddles and Daniela Gaj	Nominated	
BET Awards	2022	Best Actor	Adrian Holmes	Nominated	
BET Awards	2022	Best Actor	Jabari Banks	Nominated	
BET Awards	2022	Best Actress	Coco Jones	Nominated	
Black Reel Awards	2022	Outstanding Drama Series	Bel-Air	Won	
Black Reel Awards	2022	Outstanding Directing, Drama Series	Morgan Cooper for "Dreams and Nightmares"	Nominated	
Black Reel Awards	2022	Outstanding Writing, Drama Series	Malcolm Spellman, Morgan Cooper, T.J. Brady and Rasheed Newson for "Dreams and Nightmares"	Nominated	
Black Reel Awards	2022	Outstanding Supporting Actor, Drama Series	Adrian Holmes	Nominated	
Black Reel Awards	2022	Outstanding Supporting Actor, Drama Series	Olly Sholotan	Nominated	
Black Reel Awards	2022	Outstanding Supporting Actress, Drama Series	Coco Jones	Nominated	
Black Reel Awards	2024	Outstanding Drama Series	Bel-Air	Nominated	
Black Reel Awards	2024	Outstanding Lead Performance in a Drama Series	Jabari Banks	Nominated	
Black Reel Awards	2025	Outstanding Guest Performance in a Drama Series	April Parker Jones	Nominated	
Black Reel Awards	2025	Outstanding Guest Performance in a Drama Series	Marlon Wayans	Nominated	
NAACP Image Awards	2023	Outstanding Drama Series	Bel-Air	Nominated	
NAACP Image Awards	2023	Outstanding Actor in a Drama Series	Jabari Banks	Nominated	
NAACP Image Awards	2023	Outstanding Supporting Actor in a Drama Series	Adrian Holmes	Nominated	
NAACP Image Awards	2024	Outstanding Drama Series	Bel-Air	Nominated	
NAACP Image Awards	2024	Outstanding Actor in a Drama Series	Jabari Banks	Nominated	
NAACP Image Awards	2024	Outstanding Supporting Actor in a Drama Series	Adrian Holmes	Won	
NAACP Image Awards	2024	Outstanding Writing in a Dramatic Series	Carla Banks-Waddles	Won	
NAACP Image Awards	2024	Outstanding Makeup	Cole Patterson and Fabiola Mercado	Nominated	
NAACP Image Awards	2025	Outstanding Drama Series	Bel-Air	Nominated	
NAACP Image Awards	2025	Outstanding Actor in a Drama Series	Jabari Banks	Nominated	
NAACP Image Awards	2025	Outstanding Supporting Actress in a Drama Series	Coco Jones	Nominated	
NAACP Image Awards	2025	Outstanding Guest Performance	Marlon Wayans	Won	
NAACP Image Awards	2025	Outstanding Hairstyling	Terry Hunt	Nominated	
NAACP Image Awards	2026	Outstanding Drama Series	Bel-Air	Nominated	
NAACP Image Awards	2026	Outstanding Actor in a Drama Series	Jabari Banks	Nominated	
NAACP Image Awards	2026	Outstanding Supporting Actor in a Drama Series	Adrian Holmes	Nominated	
NAACP Image Awards	2026	Outstanding Guest Performance	Janet Hubert	Nominated	
NAACP Image Awards	2026	Outstanding Costume Design (TV or Film)	Queensylvia Akuchie	Nominated	
NAACP Image Awards	2026	Outstanding Make-up (TV or Film)	Alyssa Hudson	Won	
