= Olly Sholotan =

- Sholotan doing press for Bel-Air in 2023

Background information
- Born: Atlanta, Georgia, US
- Origin: Houston, Texas, US
- Genres: Pop; Afropop; Afrobeats
- Occupations: Actor; Singer; Music Producer
- Years active: 2019 – present
- Website: ollysholotan.com

Olly Sholotan is an American actor, singer and music producer. He is known for playing the role of Carlton Banks in Peacock's The Fresh Prince of Bel-Air reimagining Bel-Air, as well as releasing music through his independent record label Lamintin Records.

== Early life and education ==
Olly Sholotan was born in Atlanta, Georgia. He then lived in Nigeria until the age of 10, after which he and his family moved to Houston, Texas where he attended The High School for Performing And Visual Arts (HSPVA) with a concentration in theater, graduating in 2015. While attending Kinder HSPVA, Olly was selected as a Finalist by the National YoungArts Foundation.

Sholotan attended The UCLA School of Theater, Film and Television as a Musical Theater Major, and graduated in 2019.

== Filmography ==
Film Roles
Year	Title	Role	Notes	Ref
2020	Run Hide Fight	Lews Washington		
2022	Gigi & Nate	Benji Betts		
2027	Snoop	Ricardo "Kurupt" Brown	Filming	

Television Roles
Year	Title	Roles	Notes	Ref
2022–2025	Bel-Air	Carlton Banks	Main role	
2023	Cruel Summer	Trevor	Episode: "All I Want for Christmas"	

Theatre Roles
Year	Title	Role	Dates	Venue	Notes	Ref
2023	Buena Vista Social Club	Young Ibrahim Ferrer	November 17, 2023	Atlantic Theater Company	Off-Broadway	

== Awards and nominations ==
Year	Award	Category	Nominated work	Result	Ref
2022	Black Reel Awards	Outstanding Supporting Actor, Drama Series	Bel-Air	Nominated	
