= Alfonso Ribeiro =

American actor (born 1971)

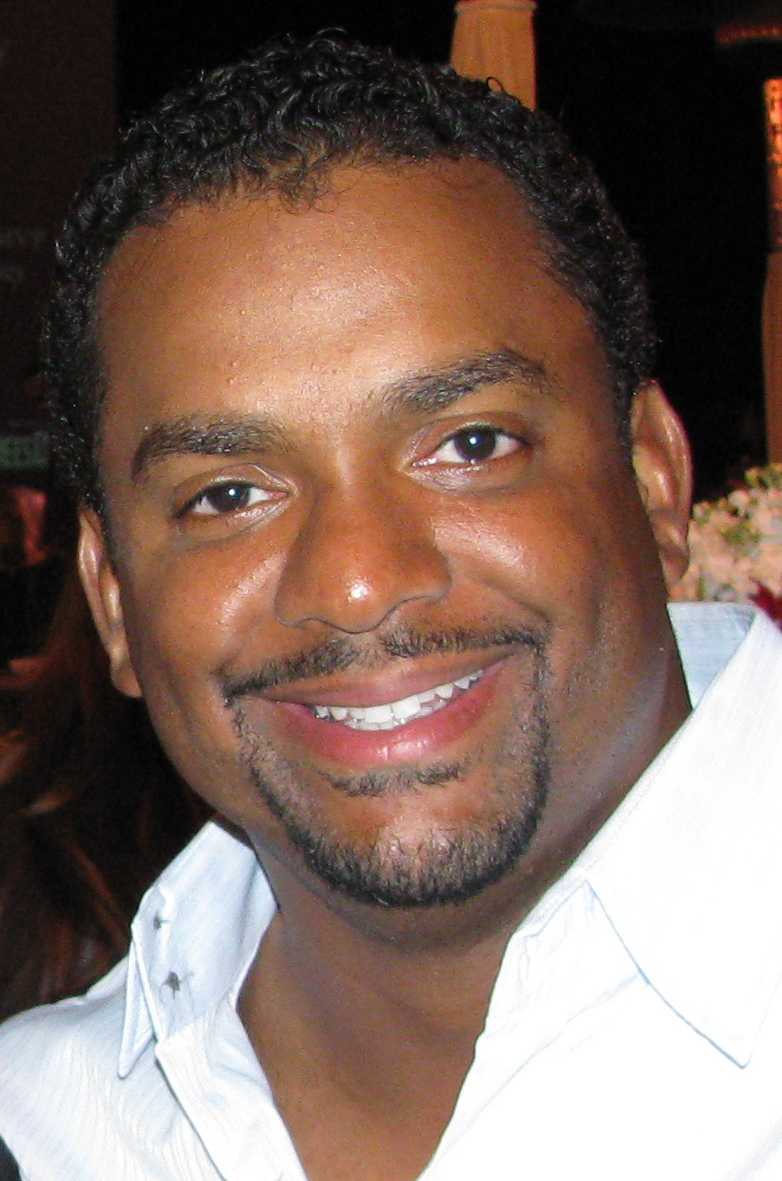
- Ribeiro in 2011
- Born: Alfonso Lincoln Ribeiro; September 21, 1971 (age 55); New York City, U.S.
- Occupations: Actor; comedian; singer; dancer; television host; director
- Years active: 1980–present
- Spouses: Robin Stapler (m. 2002; div. 2006); Angela Unkrich (m. 2012)
- Children: 4

Alfonso Lincoln Ribeiro (born September 21, 1971) is an American actor, comedian, dancer and television host. In a career spanning over four decades, he first gained notability for his role as Carlton Banks on the NBC television sitcom The Fresh Prince of Bel-Air (1990–1996), as well as his performances on Silver Spoons (1984–1987) and In the House (1996–1999).

Ribeiro started his career as a child actor and gained recognition for his titular performance in the Broadway musical The Tap Dance Kid. He later competed in the thirteenth season of the British survival show I'm a Celebrity...Get Me Out of Here!. Ribeiro later began hosting ABC's video clip series America's Funniest Home Videos as well as co-hosting the reality competition series Dancing with the Stars with Julianne Hough. He won the latter program's nineteenth season alongside professional dancer Witney Carson, with whom he presented the GSN game show Catch 21.

== Early life ==
Ribeiro was born in the Harlem neighborhood of New York City and raised in the Riverdale neighborhood of the Bronx to parents of Trinidadian descent. His paternal grandfather was Albert Ribeiro, a professional calypsonian dancer known as Lord Hummingbird. His aunt had been a dancer on Rowan & Martin's Laugh-In in the 1960s and 1970s.

== Career ==
=== Early work ===
Ribeiro began his career at age 8. He first gained recognition in 1983 when he played a leading role in the Broadway musical The Tap Dance Kid. He received positive reviews for his performance and was nominated for an Outer Critics Circle Award. Ribeiro appeared as a dancer in a Pepsi commercial that featured Michael Jackson and the Jacksons in 1984; a rumor spread that Ribeiro died from snapping his neck while dancing in the commercial. The same year, Ribeiro was cast as Ricky Schroder's best friend on the TV series Silver Spoons, after which he and his family moved to Los Angeles.

In 1985, Ribeiro authored a dance instruction book, Alfonso's Breakin' & Poppin' Book, and appeared in a commercial advertising it. He also released four 12-inch singles on Prism Records, including the 1984 track "Dance Baby". After Silver Spoons ended, Ribeiro took a hiatus from acting to finish high school and attend California State University, Los Angeles.

=== The Fresh Prince of Bel-Air ===
Ribeiro's most prominent role was as Carlton Banks, the cousin of Will Smith's lead character, on the NBC sitcom The Fresh Prince of Bel-Air from September 1990 to May 1996. Carlton was known for frequently dancing to Tom Jones' "It's Not Unusual", a dance routine that gained fame as "The Carlton". Ribeiro based "The Carlton" on Eddie Murphy's "white man dance" and Courteney Cox's dance from Bruce Springsteen's "Dancing in the Dark" music video.

=== Later work ===
Ribeiro starred on the sitcom In the House with LL Cool J from 1997 to 1999. He graduated from the New York Film Academy in 1999 and would go on to direct episodes of One on One, All of Us, Meet the Browns, Are We There Yet?, Shake It Up and K.C. Undercover.

Ribeiro appeared as a contestant on a special child TV stars episode of Weakest Link in 2001. He made it into the final round but lost to Keshia Knight-Pulliam.

In 2002, Ribeiro returned to the stage in an Encores! revival of the musical Golden Boy, starring as Joe Wellington.

Ribeiro competed as one of the celebrity singers on the reality television show Celebrity Duets in September 2006, winning over the runner-up Lucy Lawless. From 2008 to 2016, Ribeiro hosted the game show Catch 21 on GSN.

On May 24, 2013, Ribeiro made a cameo appearance on The Graham Norton Show to perform "The Carlton Dance", with show guests Will and Jaden Smith. On July 24, he began hosting his second game show, Spell-Mageddon, on ABC Family. On November 17, Ribeiro became a contestant in the thirteenth series of the British reality show I'm a Celebrity...Get Me Out of Here. He was eliminated from the show on December 5, finishing in seventh place.

On September 4, 2014, Ribeiro was announced as one of the celebrities who would compete on season 19 of Dancing with the Stars. He partnered with professional dancer Witney Carson and became the fourth celebrity dancer in the show's history to receive a 9 from each judge in week one. On November 25, 2014, Ribeiro and Carson won the competition. After his victory, he hosted the nationwide live tour for the show.

On May 19, 2015, Ribeiro was named Tom Bergeron's successor to host America's Funniest Home Videos. In July, Ribeiro made a cameo appearance in the music video for "All Night" by pop-rock band R5. In September, he returned to Dancing with the Stars as a guest judge in week three of season 21, and he substituted for Bergeron as host the following week, after Bergeron's father became ill.

In October 2018, he was announced as the host of the British game show Money Tree. That month, it was also announced that Ribeiro would sit in for Bruno Tonioli as guest judge on Strictly Come Dancing for week 5, joining regular judges Craig Revel Horwood, Darcey Bussell, and Shirley Ballas. This would also occur in week 5 of the 2019 series.

Catch 21 was revived in 2019, and Ribeiro returned as the host, with his former Dancing with the Stars partner Witney Carson joining as co-host. His role earned him a 2020 Daytime Emmy nomination for Outstanding Game Show Host, but he lost to Alex Trebek. He earned another nomination the following year, but again lost to Trebek.

In 2020, Ribeiro starred in a series of commercials for State Farm Insurance as a Chris Paul impersonator. In 2021, he voiced a character in Muppets Haunted Mansion.

In 2022, Ribeiro joined season 31 of Dancing with the Stars as co-host of the show, alongside host Tyra Banks. After Banks departed the show following season 31, Ribeiro became the main host of the show, with Julianne Hough joining as co-host, assuming Ribeiro's previous role.

=== The '90s with Alfonso Ribeiro ===
On July 6, 2019, the syndicated radio show The '90s with Alfonso Ribeiro launched on multiple radio stations across the country via Sun Broadcast Group, co-hosted by radio veteran Daena "DK" Kramer. The three-hour weekly show celebrates 1990s music and culture while Ribeiro and Kramer share their stories, pop culture facts and memories from the 1990s.

== Personal life ==
=== Family ===
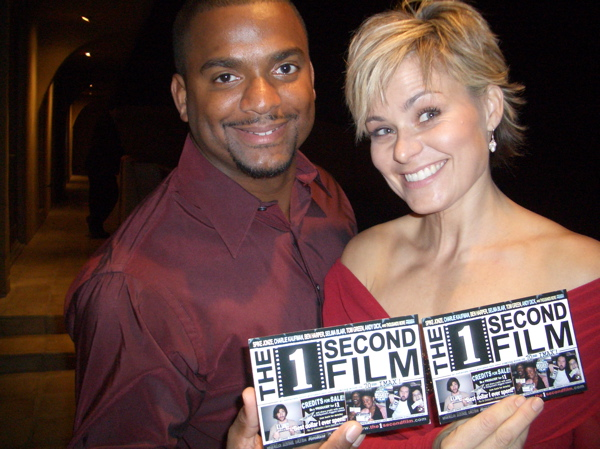
Ribeiro with his first wife Robin Stapler

Ribeiro was married to Robin Stapler from January 2002 until August 2006. They have a daughter, born in October 2002.

Ribeiro married Angela Unkrich on October 13, 2012, following a three-month engagement. The two live in Los Angeles and have three children, born in 2013, 2015, and 2019.

=== Motorsports ===
Ribeiro competed in several editions of the Toyota Pro/Celebrity Race car race in Long Beach, earning an overall win in 2015 and celebrity class wins in 1994, 1995 and 2016. He also worked as radio spotter for CART racecar driver Bryan Herta, and performed the national anthem at CART and IndyCar Series races.

=== Lawsuit against Epic Games ===
In December 2018, Ribeiro, along with Instagram star Russell Horning, aka Backpack Kid, and rapper Terrence Ferguson, aka 2 Milly, brought a lawsuit against Epic Games for their decision to feature respective choreographies in the popular game Fortnite. In Ribeiro's case, his "Carlton dance", which he made popular in the 1990s as a cast member of The Fresh Prince of Bel-Air, is one of the many dances that Fortnite players can purchase for their avatars. Epic Games declined to comment on the lawsuits. The U.S. Copyright Office denied him a copyright for his dance on January 13, 2019. On March 7, 2019, Ribeiro dropped the lawsuit.

== Filmography ==
=== Film ===
Year	Title	Role	Notes
1986	John Grin's Christmas	Rocky	TV movie
1987	Mighty Pawns	Frank	TV movie
1989	Out on the Edge	Jesse	TV movie
1993	Ticks	Darrel "Panic" Lumnley	
1996	Kidz in the Wood	Morgan	TV movie
2004	Seek & Hide	Dr. Grone	Short
2005	Love Wrecked	Bert Hernandez	

=== Television ===
Year	Title	Role	Notes
1983–87	Silver Spoons	Alfonso Spears	Main Cast: Season 3–5
1985	NBC Special Treat	Himself	Episode: "Kids Just Kids"
1986	One to Grow On	Himself	Episode: "Responsible Spending"
1986	Magnum, P.I.	Kenneth	Recurring Cast: Season 7
1988	CBS Schoolbreak Special	Buddy	Episode: "Home Sweet Homeless"
1990	A Different World	Zach Duncan	Episode: "Hillmann Isn't Through With You Yet"
1990–96	The Fresh Prince of Bel-Air	Carlton Banks	Main Cast
1992	An Evening at the Improv	Himself/Host	Episode: "Episode #9.16"
1992	Where in the World Is Carmen Sandiego?	Himself	Episode: "She Took the Notes Right of My Mouth"
1993	Scattergories	Himself/Panelist	Episode: "Episode #1.24"
1994	Soul Train	Himself/Guest Host	Episode: "R. Kelly/Gabrielle"
1994	Bill Nye, the Science Guy	Himself	Episode: "Food Web"
1995–99	In the House	Carlton Banks/Dr. Maxwell Stanton	Guest: Season 2, Main Cast: Season 3–5
1996–97	Spider-Man: The Animated Series	Randy Robertson (voice)	Guest Cast: Season 3–4
1997	Wild On!	Himself	Episode: "Wild on the Bermuda Triangle"
1997	Happily Ever After: Fairy Tales for Every Child	Kephra (voice)	Episode: "King Midas and the Golden Touch"
1997	Extreme Ghostbusters	Roland Jackson (voice)	Main Cast
1999	V.I.P.	Himself	Episode: "The Last Temptation of Val"
2000–01	Your Big Break	Himself/Host	Main Host: Season 2
2001	The Test	Himself/Panelist	Episode: "The Voyeur Test"
2001	The Weakest Link	Himself/Contestant	Episode: "TV Child Stars Edition"
2002	I Love the '80s	Himself	Recurring Guest
2002	One on One	Lenny	Episode: "Me and My Shadow"
2002	The Rerun Show	Dwayne	Episode: "Bewitched: Divided He Falls/What's Happening!!: Rerun Gets Married"
2002	For Your Love	Ray	Episode: "The Professionals"
2002–03	The Brothers García	Mr. Sweets	Guest Cast: Season 3-4
2004	I Love the '90s	Himself	Main Guest
2003	Cedric the Entertainer Presents	Himself	Episode: "Episode #1.16"
2006	Celebrity Duets	Himself/Contestant	Main Guest
2006	Robot Chicken	Himself (voice)	Episode: "Veggies for Sloth/Blankets in a Pig"
2007	E! True Hollywood Story	Himself	Episode: "Will Smith"
2007	The Singing Bee	Himself	Episode: "Episode #2.8"
2007	Dancing with the Stars	Himself	Episode: "Round 5 Results"
2008	Last Comic Standing	Himself/Talent Scout	Episode: "Auditions 2"
2008	Gumball 3000: Off Road	Himself/Host	Main Host
2008–09	GSN Live	Himself/Host	Main Host
2008–11	Catch 21	Himself/Host	Main Host
2010	Gylne tider	Himself	Episode: "Episode #4.7"
2011	Are We There Yet?	Skinner (voice)	Recurring Cast: Season 2
2011	Things We Do for Love	Darren	Main Cast
2012	Kendra on Top	Himself	Episode: "Fore Play"
2012	Kitchen Cousins	Himself	Episode: "A Fresh Perspective"
2012	Big Time Rush	Captain McAllister	Episode: "Bel Air Rush"
2013	Spell-Mageddon	Himself/Host	Main Host
2013	I'm a Celebrity...Get Me Out of Here!	Himself/Contestant	Contestant: Season 13
2013	Shake It Up	Mr. Zigfeld	Episode: "My Fair Librarian it Up"
2013–17	Access Hollywood	Himself/Guest Co-Host	Recurring Guest Co-Host
2014–present	Dancing with the Stars	Himself/Contestant/Host	Contestant: Season 19, Guest: Season 20–21 & 25 & 28, Main Host: Season 31–
2015	#DanceBattle America	Himself/Host	Main Host
2015–17	Unwrapped 2.0	Himself/Host	Main Host
2015–present	America's Funniest Home Videos	Himself/Host	Main Host: Season 26–
2016	Whose Line Is It Anyway?	Himself	Episode: "Alfonso Ribeiro"
2016	Guilty Pleasures	Himself	Recurring Guest
2016	The $100,000 Pyramid	Himself/Celebrity Player	Episode: "Alfonso Ribeiro vs. Mario Batali"
2016	Celebrity Family Feud	Himself/Contestant	Episode: "Episode #3.10"
2018–19	Strictly Come Dancing	Himself/Guest Judge	Recurring Guest Judge: Season 16–17
2019–20	Entertainment Tonight	Himself/Guest Co-Host	Guest Co-Host: Season 39–40
2019–20	Catch 21	Himself/Host	Main Host
2020–21	To Tell the Truth	Himself/Celebrity Panelist	Guest Panelist: Season 5–6
2021	Wheel of Fortune	Himself/Celebrity Contestant	Episode: "Robert Herjavec, Chris Harrison and Alfonso Ribeiro"
2021–22	America's Funniest Home Videos: Animal Edition	Himself/Host	Main Host
2022	The Golden Goofs Awards	Himself/Host	Main Host
2022	Jay Leno's Garage	Himself	Episode: "Premiere Cars"
2022	Big City Greens	Mr. Extras (voice)	Episode: "Virtually Christmas"
2023	Celebrity Family Feud	Himself/Contestant	Episode: "Episode #10.9"
2023–24	Catch 21	Himself/Host	Main Host
2024	The Talk	Himself/Guest Co-Host	Episode: "Chandra Wilson/Natasha Rothwell/Alfonso Ribeiro"
2024–present	Jack Hanna's Passport	Himself/Host	

=== Directing ===
Television
Year	Title	Notes	Ref.
1995	The Fresh Prince of Bel-Air	Episode: "I, Ooh, Baby, Baby"	
1997–98	In the House	4 Episodes	
2003	The Brothers García	1 episode	
2004–07	All of Us	26 episodes	
2005–06	One on One	8 episodes	
2006	Cuts	1 episode	
2006	Eve	1 episode	
2009–10	Meet the Browns	8 episodes	
2010	True Jackson, VP	1 episode	
2011	Things We Do for Love	4 episodes	
2011–12	Are We There Yet?	20 episodes	
2012–13	Shake It Up	7 episodes	
2013–14	Let's Stay Together	4 episodes	
2014	Mighty Med	1 episode	
2015	Young & Hungry	Episode: "Young & Part Two" (season 2)	
2015–18	K.C. Undercover	2 episodes	

== Dancing with the Stars performances ==
Ribeiro was partnered with Witney Carson for season 19. On November 25, 2014, Ribeiro and Carson were declared the season's champions.

In November 2017, Ribeiro returned to 25th season in Week eight, to participate in a trio Jive with Frankie Muniz and his professional partner Witney Carson.

Week #	Dance / Song	Judges' score				Result
Week #	Dance / Song	Inaba	Goodman	Hough	Tonioli	Result
1	Jive / "3-6-9"	9	9	9	9	Safe
2	Samba / "Gettin' Jiggy wit It"	8	8	8	8	Safe
3	Quickstep / "Hey Goldmember"	8	8^{1}	8	8	Safe
4	Jazz / "It's Not Unusual"	10	10^{2}	10	10	Safe
5^{3}	Flamenco / "Angelica"	8	9^{4}	9	8	No elimination
6	Salsa / "Booty"	10	10^{5}	9	10	Safe
7	Rumba / "Ghost"; Team freestyle / "Time Warp"	9; 8	9; 8	9; 8	9; 8	Safe
8	Cha-cha-cha / "Trust"; Jive dance-off / "Rip It Up"	10; Awarded	9; 3	9 Extra	10; Points	Safe
9	Foxtrot / "Ain't That a Kick in the Head?"; Trio Paso Doble / "Turn Down for What"	9; 10	9; 10	9; 10	10; 10	Safe
10; Semi-finals	Argentine tango / "Love Runs Out"; Contemporary / "Love Runs Out" (acoustic version)	9; 10	9; 9	9; 10	9; 10	Safe
11; Finals	Jive / "3-6-9"; Freestyle / "Sing, Sing, Sing (With a Swing)"; Cha-cha-cha and Argentine tango fusion / "Shut Up and Dance"	10; 10; 10	10; 10; 10	10; 10; 10	10; 10; 10	Winner

^{1} Score given by guest judge Kevin Hart in place of Goodman.

^{2}The American public scored the dance in place of Goodman with the averaged score being counted alongside the three other judges.

^{3}This week only, for "Partner Switch-Up" week, Ribeiro performed with Cheryl Burke instead of Carson.

^{4}Score given by guest judge Jessie J in place of Goodman.

^{5}Score given by guest judge Pitbull in place of Goodman.

== Stage ==
Year	Title	Role	Venue	Notes	Ref.
1983	The Tap Dance Kid	Willie	Broadhurst Theater, Broadway	Broadway debut	
2002	Golden Boy	Joe Wellington	New York City Center		

== Discography ==
=== Singles ===
Title	Year	Peak chart positions
Title	Year	US
"Dance Baby"	1984	104
"Ooh Child"	1984	—
"Not Too Young (To Fall in Love)"	1985	—
"Time Bomb"	1986	—
"—" denotes a recording that did not chart.

Awards and achievements
Preceded by Meryl Davis & Maksim Chmerkovskiy	Dancing with the Stars (USA) winners Season 19 (Fall 2014 with Witney Carson)	Succeeded by Rumer Willis and Valentin Chmerkovskiy
