= Samantha Butler =

American academic

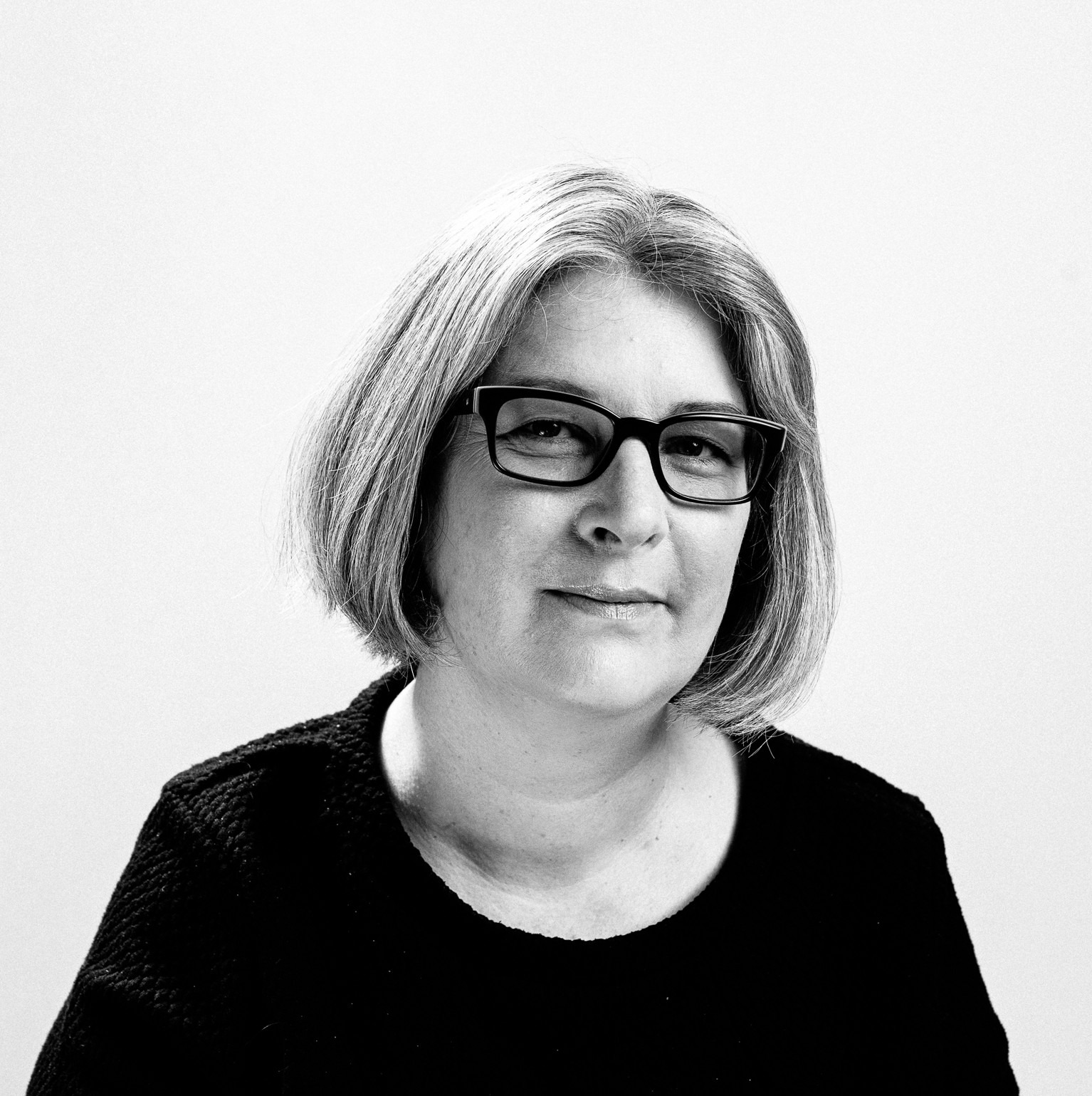
- Education: University of Cambridge; Princeton University
- Known for: Understanding the mechanisms that establish and regenerate the spinal cord
- Scientific career
- Fields: Developmental Biology, Neuroscience, Stem Cell Biology
- Workplaces: University of California, Los Angeles
- Doctoral advisor: Yasushi Hiromi
- Other academic advisors: Jane Dodd
- Website: butlerlab.neurobio.ucla.edu

Samantha J. Butler is a British American developmental neuroscientist at University of California, Los Angeles. She studies how the sensory interneurons in the spinal cord are first established during development and then connect to form circuits. Her research goal is to develop drugs and stem cell-based therapies that help people with spinal cord injuries and nerve damage regain sensation.

== Early life and education ==
Butler grew up in Oxford, England, and is the granddaughter of astrophysicist, Fred Hoyle. She attended Headington Rye Oxford, where she was taught mathematics by Lily Atiyah, the wife of Michael Atiyah, also a mathematician. After graduating, she spent her gap year first taking mathematics modules at Oxford Brookes University and then working at the Tata Institute of Fundamental Research, Mumbai, India.

While reading Natural Sciences as an undergraduate at Emmanuel College, Cambridge, Butler became interested in developmental genetics. She completed a Part II in Genetics (1990), studying mutations in the ultrabithorax gene, part of the Hox complex in Drosophila melanogaster, with Michael Akam. In 1996, she received her Ph.D. in Molecular Biology from Princeton University, advised by Yasushi Hiromi. Her doctoral studies in developmental genetics, focused on charactering an enhancer trap line (h214), that was a candidate for encoding specific neural identity in the developing Drosophila eye. The associated gene was found to be a cell adhesion molecule and was thus called "klingon."

From 1997 to 2003, Butler worked as a postdoctoral fellow with Jane Dodd at Columbia University, in the Department of Physiology and Cellular Biophysics. At around this time, inspired by a heartfelt plea by a paraplegic man at a conference, Butler switched model systems to work on axon guidance mechanisms in the developing vertebrate spinal cord. Her studies showed that the roof plate secretes a diffusible repellent that orients commissural axons away from the dorsal midline. Butler further demonstrated that this repellent is mediated by the bone morphogenic protein (BMP) growth family, the first studies to demonstrate that growth factors could act as axon guidance signals. Together, these findings suggested that the same signal can reiteratively specify different cellular processes for neurons at different stages of their development. During this time, Butler was funded by a fellowship from the Paralyzed Veterans of America.

== Research ==
From 2004 to 2013, Butler was an assistant professor in the Biological Sciences department at the University of Southern California. In 2013, Butler moved to the David Geffen School of Medicine at the University of California, Los Angeles where she is a professor in the Department of Neurobiology and the Vice Chair for Community. She has held the Eleanor I. Leslie Chair in Pioneering Brain Research.

Butler's research focus is to understand the mechanisms that establish and regenerate neural circuitry. She has identified the signaling pathways that permit BMPs to direct cell fate and axon guidance decisions, two strikingly different processes in the generation of neural circuits. She then showed that BMPs do not act as morphogens to pattern the dorsal spinal cord. Rather, different BMP ligands promote progenitor patterning and/or neuronal differentiation to direct a unique range of dorsal cellular identities.

By dissecting the developmental mechanisms by which BMPs direct cell fates, Butler has established the first directed differentiation protocols that generate spinal sensory interneurons from mouse and human stem cells. These protocols make stem cell-derived sensory interneurons that are transcriptionally indistinguishable from their endogenous counterparts, and will facilitate developing cellular replacement therapies to reestablish sensory connections in injured patients.

Butler has also identified a critical mechanism that controls the rate of axon outgrowth during embryogenesis and axon regeneration. Manipulating this mechanism permits more rapid functional recovery after a nerve crush, thereby offering the hope of improving recovery times for patients with serious peripheral nerve injuries.

Butler reignited the debate about the mechanism by which netrin1, the first guidance cue identified in vertebrates, functions in the spinal cord. Her studies have demonstrated that netrin1 promotes axon growth not by long-range chemotaxis, but rather by short-range haptotaxis, the directed growth of cells along an adhesive surface. These studies suggest that neural progenitors have an intrinsic capacity to form axon growth tracts, a critical insight for promoting directed, fasciculated regenerative axonal growth. Butler has continued to identify unexpected roles for netrin1, most recently finding that the polarized distribution of netrin1 in the developing spinal cord also acts as a boundary to restrict BMP signaling and thereby regulate cell fate decisions.

== Selected honors and awards ==
- 2000 Spinal Cord Research Foundation/Paralyzed Veterans of America Fellowship
- 2017 Rose Hills Foundation Scholar
- 2018 Eleanor I. Leslie Chair in Pioneering Brain Research
- 2019 JCCC-BSCRC Ablon Scholar
- 2022 UCLA Molecular Biology Institute Mentoring Award for faculty
- 2022 Standing member, NDPR study section, NIH
- 2023 Faculty/Staff Partnership Award, UCLA Staff Assembly
- 2024 Marcus Foundation Award
