= UCLA Broad Stem Cell Research Center =

Stem Cell Research Center

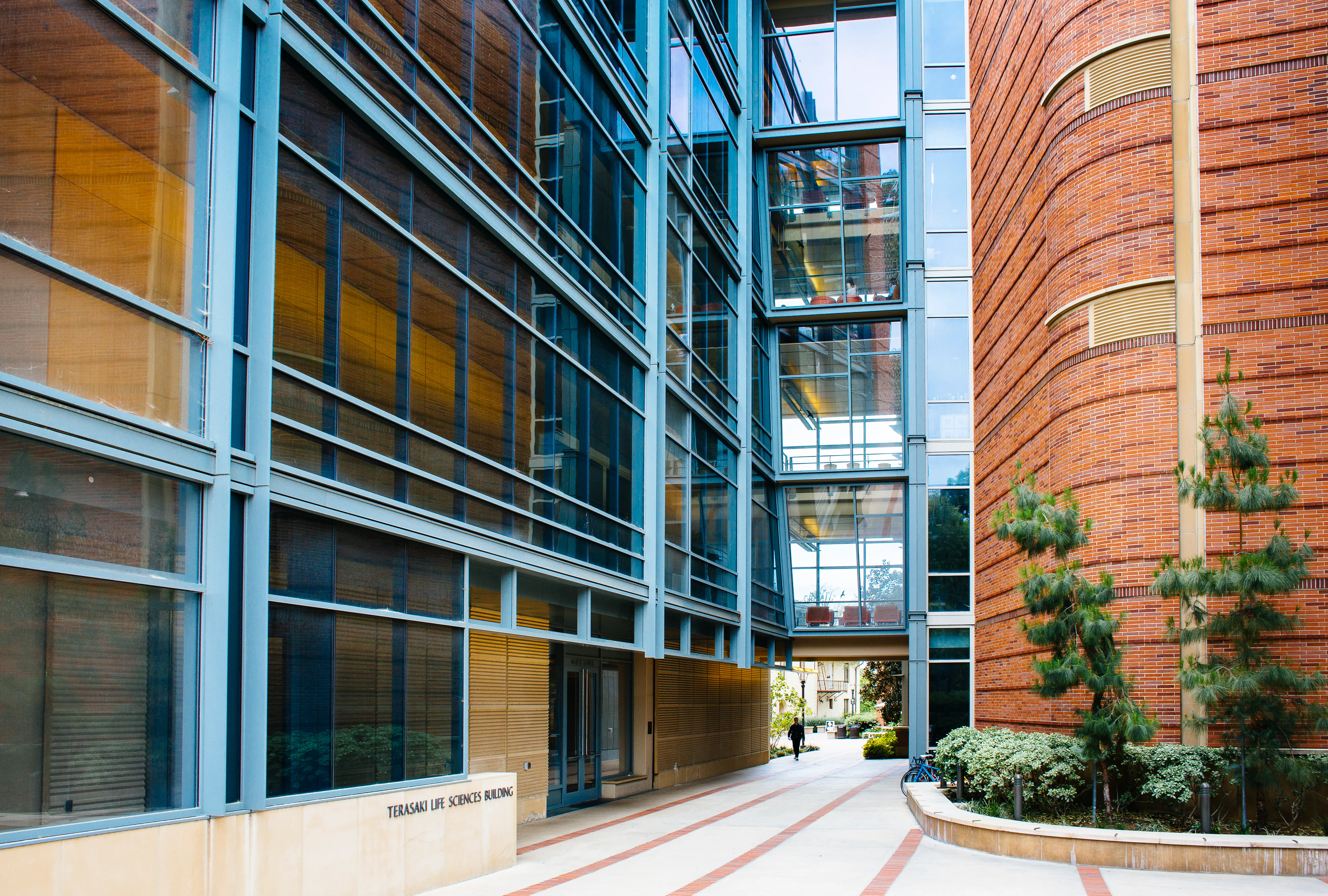
- Established: 2005
- Members: 250 faculty
- Director: Thomas A. Rando

The Eli and Edythe Broad Center of Regenerative Medicine and Stem Cell Research at UCLA, also known as the UCLA Broad Stem Cell Research Center, is a biomedical research center at the University of California, Los Angeles that focuses on stem cell research. The center's more than 250 faculty members represent the UCLA professional schools as well as the College.

== History ==
In 2005, then-UCLA Chancellor Albert Carnesale launched the center, initially named the Institute for Stem Cell Biology and Medicine, to create and support multidisciplinary teams of UCLA stem cell researchers that would utilize cutting-edge technologies to spearhead the next generation of medicine. Under the leadership of founding director Owen Witte and co-director Judith Gasson, the institute began recruiting internationally renowned scientists to join its membership. In 2006, the institute was awarded its first grant from the California Institute for Regenerative Medicine (CIRM) to launch a program to train the next generation of scientists and clinicians in stem cell research and regenerative medicine.

In 2007, the institute was renamed the Eli and Edythe Broad Center of Regenerative Medicine and Stem Cell Research at UCLA in recognition of a $20 million gift from The Eli and Edythe Broad Foundation.

In 2014, the center — along with the Sue & Bill Gross Stem Cell Research Center at University of California, Irvine — received an $8-million grant from CIRM to establish a CIRM Alpha Stem Cell Clinic "center of excellence" to conduct clinical trials for investigational stem cell therapies and provide critical resources and expertise in clinical research. In 2022, the center received an $8-million grant from CIRM to expand the UCLA Alpha Stem Cell Clinic and include a wider cross-section of Los Angeles' diverse population.

== Facilities ==
The UCLA Broad Stem Cell Research Center supports several shared resources, including research cores and infrastructure.

It also offers training for UCLA undergraduate and graduate students, postdoctoral scholars and clinical fellows as well as undergraduates from California State University, Northridge through a special partnership. This research training provides hands-on experience in the labs and serves as a fundamental pathway for education and career development.

== Impact ==
Center researchers have made strides in understanding stem cells and turning discoveries made in the lab into therapies and cures.

In 2008 — only three years after the center's inception — a group of center scientists led by Kathrin Plath and William Lowry were the first in California to reprogram human skin cells into cells with embryonic stem cell-like properties without using embryos or eggs, impacting disease treatment, tissue engineering and transplantation medicine.

In the years since, center members have also led or are leading clinical trials of stem cell-based or regenerative medicine approaches including:

- Blood stem cell gene therapy for the immune deficiencies X-linked chronic granulomatous disease and adenosine deaminase deficient severe combined immunodeficiency (ADA-SCID)
- Novel immunotherapies to treat melanomas, sarcomas and multiple myeloma.
- Cell replacement therapies for conditions such as blindness-causing corneal diseases
