= University of California, Los Angeles =

American public research university

- Former names: List: Los Angeles branch of the California State Normal School (1881–1887); Los Angeles State Normal School (1887–1919); Southern Branch of the University of California (1919–1927); University of California at Los Angeles (1927–1958)
- Motto: Fiat lux (Latin)
- Motto in English: "Let there be light"
- Type: Public land-grant research university
- Established: 1881; 145 years ago (May 23, 1919 as a UC campus)
- Parent institution: University of California
- Accreditation: WSCUC
- Academic affiliations: AAU; APRU; URA; Space-grant
- Endowment: $10.32 billion (FY2025) (Total Endowment Assets)
- Chancellor: Julio Frenk
- Vice-Chancellor: Darnell Hunt
- Faculty: 7,941
- Administrative staff: 32,883 (fall 2023)
- Undergraduates: 33,040 (fall 2023)
- Postgraduates: 13,636 (fall 2023)
- Other students: 1,372 (fall 2023)
- Location: Los Angeles, California, United States; 34.0722°N 118.4427°W
- Campus: 467 acres (189 ha); Large city
- Newspaper: Daily Bruin
- Colors: Blue and gold
- Nickname: Bruins
- Sporting affiliations: NCAA Division I FBS – Big Ten; MPSF
- Mascots: Joe Bruin; Josephine Bruin
- Website: ucla.edu

The University of California, Los Angeles (UCLA) is a public land-grant research university in the Westwood neighborhood of Los Angeles, California, United States. Its academic roots were established in 1881 as the southern branch of the California State Normal School, which is now San José State University. The campus was transferred to the University of California to become its southern branch in 1919, making it the second-oldest of the 10-campus University of California system after the University of California, Berkeley. It officially became independent from Berkeley on June 14, 1951, setting the precedent for the University of California system, removing Berkeley's administrative oversight over the other campuses.

UCLA offers 337 undergraduate and graduate degree programs in a range of disciplines, enrolling about 31,600 undergraduate and 14,300 graduate and professional students annually. It received 174,914 undergraduate applications for Fall 2022, including transfers, the most of any university in the United States. The university is organized into the College of Letters and Science and twelve professional schools. Six of the schools offer undergraduate degree programs: Arts and Architecture, Engineering and Applied Science, Music, Nursing, Public Affairs, and Theater, Film and Television. Three others are graduate-level professional health science schools: Medicine, Dentistry, and Public Health. Its three remaining schools are Education & Information Studies, Management and Law.

UCLA student-athletes compete as the Bruins in the Big Ten Conference. They won 126 NCAA team championships while in the Big Ten and the Pac-12 Conference, second only to Stanford University's 128 team titles. 436 Bruins have made Olympic teams, winning 284 Olympic medals: 141 gold, 74 silver and 69 bronze. UCLA has been represented in every Olympics since the university's founding (except in 1924) and has had a gold medalist in every Olympics in which the U.S. has participated since 1932.

As of October 2025, 19 Nobel laureates, 11 Rhodes scholars, 10 astronauts, 3 Turing Award winners, 2 Dan David Prize winners, 2 chief scientists of the U.S. Air Force, 1 Pritzker Prize winner, 7 Pulitzer Prize winners, 2 U.S. poet laureates, 1 Gauss prize winner, and 2 Fields Medalist have been affiliated with it as faculty, researchers and alumni. As of April 2025, 61 associated faculty members have been elected to the National Academy of Sciences, 17 to the American Philosophical Society, 34 to the National Academy of Engineering, 49 to the National Academy of Medicine, 29 to the National Academy of Inventors, and 71 to the American Academy of Arts and Sciences.

== History ==
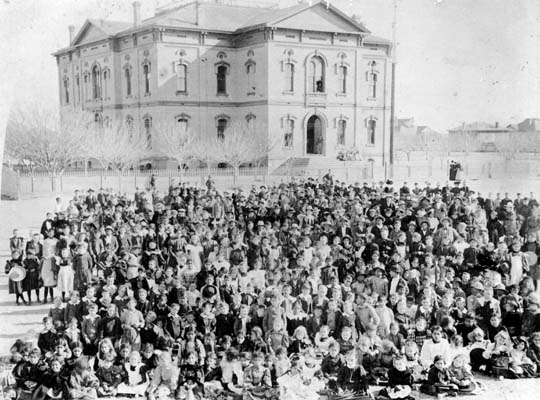
The Los Angeles branch of the California State Normal School, 1881

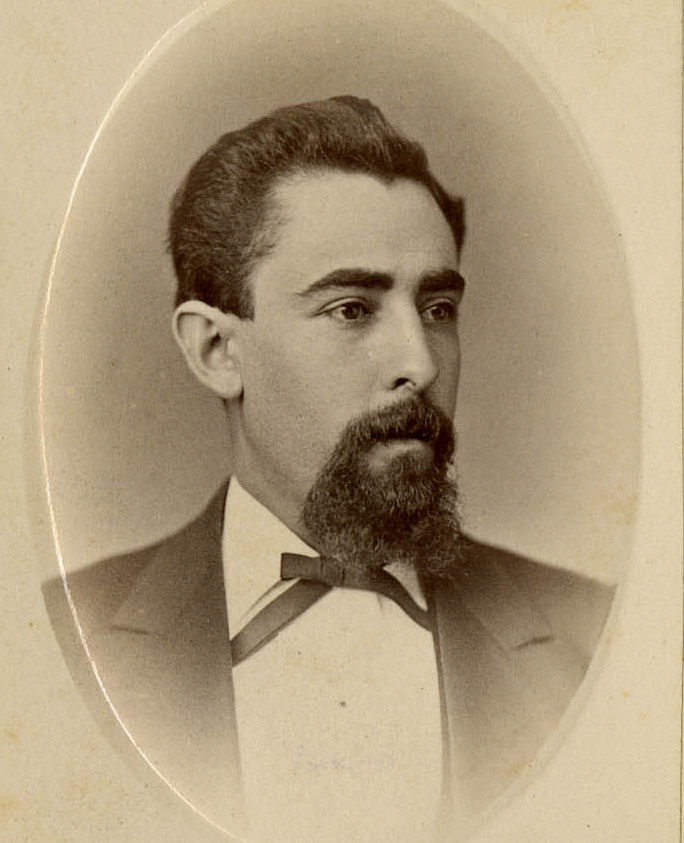
Reginaldo Francisco del Valle was instrumental in the creation of the Los Angeles California State Normal School, predecessor to UCLA.

In March 1881, at the request of state senator Reginaldo Francisco del Valle, the California State Legislature authorized the creation of a southern branch of the California State Normal School (now San José State University) in downtown Los Angeles to train teachers for the growing population of Southern California. The "Los Angeles branch of the California State Normal School" opened on August 29, 1882, on what is now the site of the Central Library of the Los Angeles Public Library system. The facility included a demonstration school where teachers-in-training could practice their techniques with children. That elementary school would become the present day UCLA Lab School. In 1887, the branch campus became independent and changed its name to Los Angeles State Normal School.

In 1914, the school moved to a new campus on Vermont Avenue (now the site of Los Angeles City College) in East Hollywood. In 1917, UC Regent Edward Augustus Dickson, the only regent representing the Southland at the time, and Ernest Carroll Moore, President of the Los Angeles State Normal School, began to lobby the State Legislature to enable the school to become the second University of California campus, after UC Berkeley. They met resistance from UC Berkeley alumni, Northern California members of the state legislature and then-UC President Benjamin Ide Wheeler, who were all vigorously opposed to the idea of a southern campus.

The state constitution expressly protected the autonomy of the University of California from political interference, which meant the Legislature could not directly command the Board of Regents to create a southern campus. However, the state constitution did not prohibit the state legislature from passing legislation to create additional state universities. The supporters of the Los Angeles State Normal School used the possibility of that scenario to pressure the Board of Regents to voluntarily accept the normal school as UC's southern campus. In 1919, the California Legislature passed a bill formally transforming the Los Angeles State Normal School into the Southern Branch of the University of California, making it the first UC campus established after Berkeley.

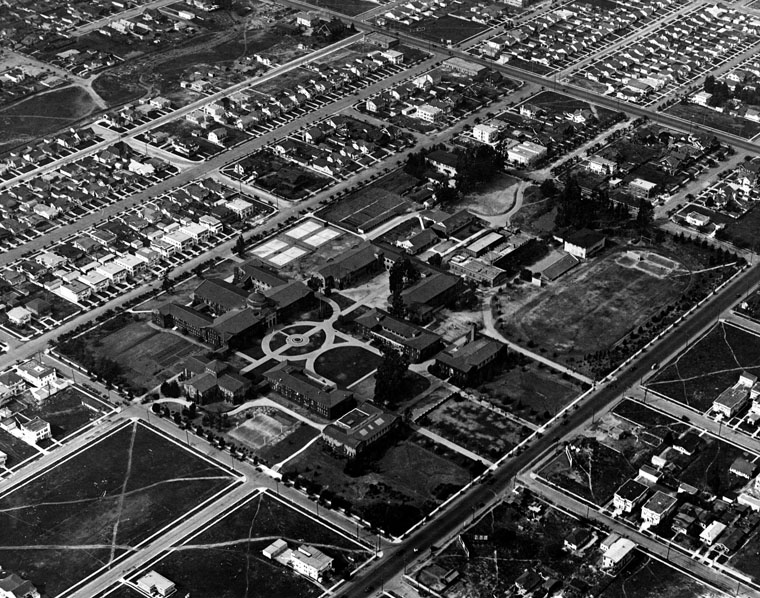
Southern Branch of the University of California's Vermont Campus, 1922

On May 23, 1919, the Southern Californians' efforts were rewarded when Governor William D. Stephens signed Assembly Bill 626 into law, which acquired the land and buildings and transformed the Los Angeles Normal School into the "Southern Branch of the University of California". The same legislation added its general undergraduate program, the Junior College. The Southern Branch campus opened on September 15 of that year, offering two-year undergraduate programs to 250 Junior College students and 1,250 students in the Teachers College. While University of Southern California students criticized the "branch" as a mere "twig", Southern Californians continued to fight Northern Californians for the right to three and then four years of instruction. In December 1923, the Board of Regents authorized a fourth year of instruction and transformed the Junior College into the College of Letters and Science, which awarded its first bachelor's degrees in June 1925.

Under UC President William Wallace Campbell, enrollment at the Southern Branch expanded so rapidly that by the mid-1920s the institution was outgrowing the 25 acre Vermont Avenue location. The Regents announced the new "Beverly Site"—just west of Beverly Hills—in 1925. After the athletic teams entered the Pacific Coast conference in 1926, the Southern Branch student council adopted the nickname "Bruins", a name offered by the student council at UC Berkeley. On February 1, 1927, the Regents renamed the Southern Branch the "University of California at Los Angeles". In the same year, the state broke ground in Westwood on land sold for $1 million, less than one-third its value, by real estate developers Edwin and Harold Janss, for whom the Janss Steps are named. The campus in Westwood opened to students in 1929.

The original four buildings were the College Library (now Powell Library), Royce Hall, the Physics-Biology Building (which became the Humanities Building and is now the Renee and David Kaplan Hall), and the Chemistry Building (now Haines Hall), arrayed around a quadrangular courtyard on the 400 acre (1.6 km^{2}) campus. The first undergraduate classes on the new campus were held in 1929 with 5,500 students. UCLA was permitted to award the master's degree in 1933, and the doctorate in 1936, against continued resistance from UC Berkeley.

=== Maturity as a university ===
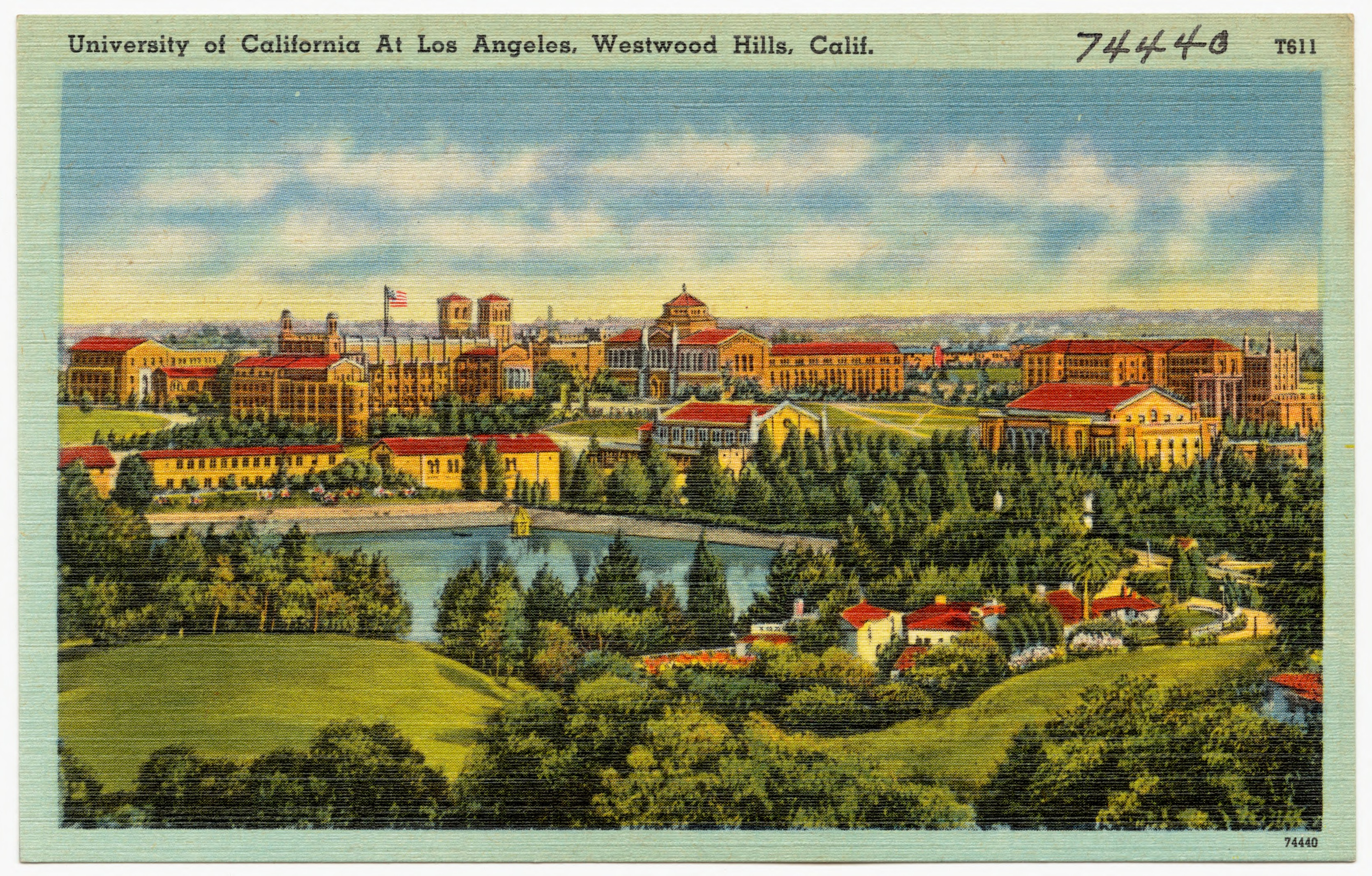
Postcard c. 1930 to 1945 of the new Westwood campus

During its first 32 years, UCLA was treated as an off-site department of the main campus in Berkeley. As such, its presiding officer was called a "provost". This remained the case even when it grew into a major institution in its own right. In 1951, UCLA was formally elevated to coequal status with UC Berkeley, with both institutions headed by chancellors who reported on an equal basis to the president of the UC system. Raymond B. Allen was the first UCLA chief executive to be granted the title of chancellor. In November 1958, the "at" in UCLA's name was replaced with a comma, a symbol of its independence from Berkeley.

The appointment of Franklin David Murphy to the position of chancellor in 1960 helped spark an era of tremendous growth of facilities and faculty honors. This era secured UCLA's position as a proper university in its own right and not simply a branch of the UC system.

=== Recent history ===
On June 1, 2016, two men were killed in a murder-suicide at an engineering building in the university. School officials put the campus on lockdown as Los Angeles Police Department officers, including SWAT, cleared the campus. In February 2022, Matthew Harris, a former lecturer and postdoctoral fellow at UCLA, was arrested after allegedly making numerous threats of violence against students and faculty members of UCLA's Philosophy Department.

In 2018, a student-led community coalition known as "Westwood Forward" successfully led an effort to break UCLA and Westwood Village away from the existing Westwood Neighborhood Council and form a new North Westwood Neighborhood Council, with over 2,000 out of 3,521 stakeholders voting in favor of the split. Westwood Forward's campaign focused on making housing more affordable and encouraging nightlife in Westwood by opposing many of the restrictions on housing developments and restaurants the Westwood Neighborhood Council had promoted. In 2022, UCLA signed an agreement to partner with the Tongva for the caretaking and landscaping of various areas of the campus. This included land use for ceremonial events and educational workshops and outreach events.

=== Spring 2024 pro-Palestine encampment ===
On April 25, 2024, an occupation protest began at UCLA to protest the administration's investments in Israel amid the Gaza war. On April 28, clashes occurred between pro-Palestinian and pro-Israel protesters as Stand With Us rallied on the campus, in a protest organized by the Israeli American Council.

Beginning on April 25, counter-protests in support of Israel emerged aimed at dismantling the encampment. On April 30, violent clashes were reported on the UCLA campus between pro-Palestinian protesters and groups of counter-demonstrators. After playing Israeli children's songs alongside a baby's cry for several hours (a tactic used to torture Palestinian prisoners), counter-protestors began physically assaulting the students inside the encampment with fireworks, wooden planks, capsaicin sprays, and pipes. Police were called shortly after the attack began, but refused to intervene until hours after the first firework went off, telling multiple 911 callers: "You can't continue calling unless you have an emergency." The attack continued for four more hours before California state highway patrol officers arrived to disperse the crowd of counter-protestors at around 3:00 AM, making no arrests.

Over 20 students had to be hospitalized due to injuries of various severities inflicted by counter-protesters. On May 1, UC administration unsuccessfully sent campus administrator Darnell Hunt into the encampment to negotiate an end to the encampment. The same night, police swept the Palestine Solidarity Encampment and arrested more than 200 pro-Palestinian student protestors. The UCLA chapter of Students For Justice in Palestine claimed five students were shot in the head with rubber bullets during the sweep, but the LAPD denied that rubber bullets were used. Varying, sometimes contradictory, media accounts exist on the manner and extent to which rubber bullets were used during the sweep. Several months later, two counter-protestors were arrested for their role in the April 30 attack. LA County District Attorney George Gascón declined to charge other individuals identified as attackers against the encampment and individuals inside the encampment.

In June 2024, three Jewish students filed a lawsuit against UCLA, alleging "that the university played a role in preventing them from accessing the campus freely during protests, when they were blocked from entering the pro-Palestinian encampment erected by protesters." The students were represented by Becket Law. In July 2024, United States District Judge Mark C. Scarsi ordered that UCLA must "create a plan to ensure Jewish students have equal access to campus" as a result of the lawsuit. In July 2025, UCLA agreed to pay $6.13 million to settle the lawsuit.

== Campus ==
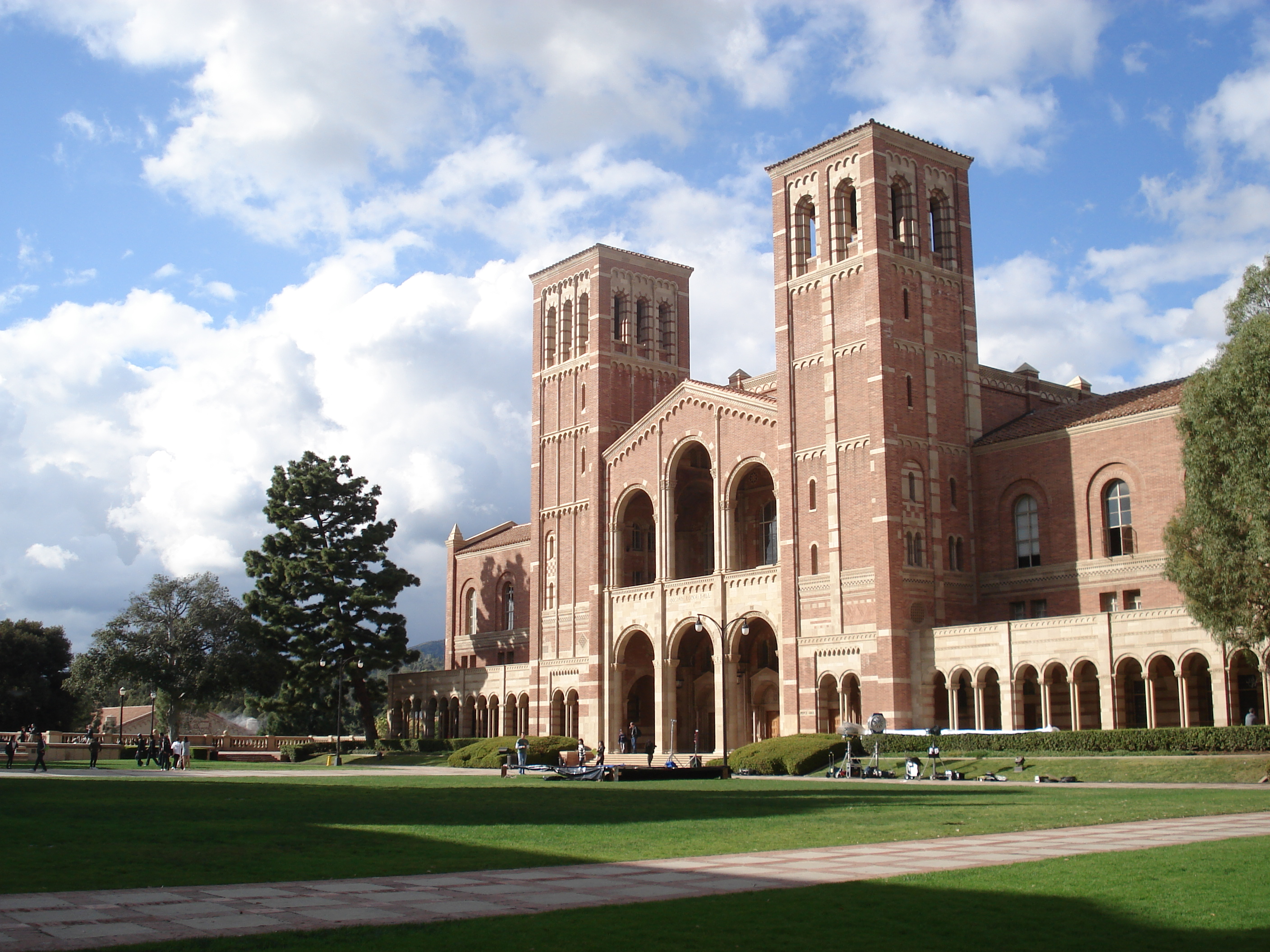
Royce Hall, one of the original four buildings, inspired by Basilica of Sant'Ambrogio in Milan, Italy

The Bruin statue, designed by Billy Fitzgerald, in Bruin Plaza

The new UCLA campus in 1929 had four buildings: Royce Hall and Haines Hall on the north, and Powell Library and Kinsey Hall (now called Renee And David Kaplan Hall) on the south. The Janss Steps were the original 87-step entrance to the university that lead to the quad of these four buildings. Today, the campus includes 163 buildings across 419 acres (1.7 km^{2}) in the western part of Los Angeles, north of the Westwood shopping district and just south of Sunset Boulevard. In terms of acreage, it is the second-smallest of the ten UC campuses. The Channel Islands are visible from the UCLA campus.

=== Architecture ===
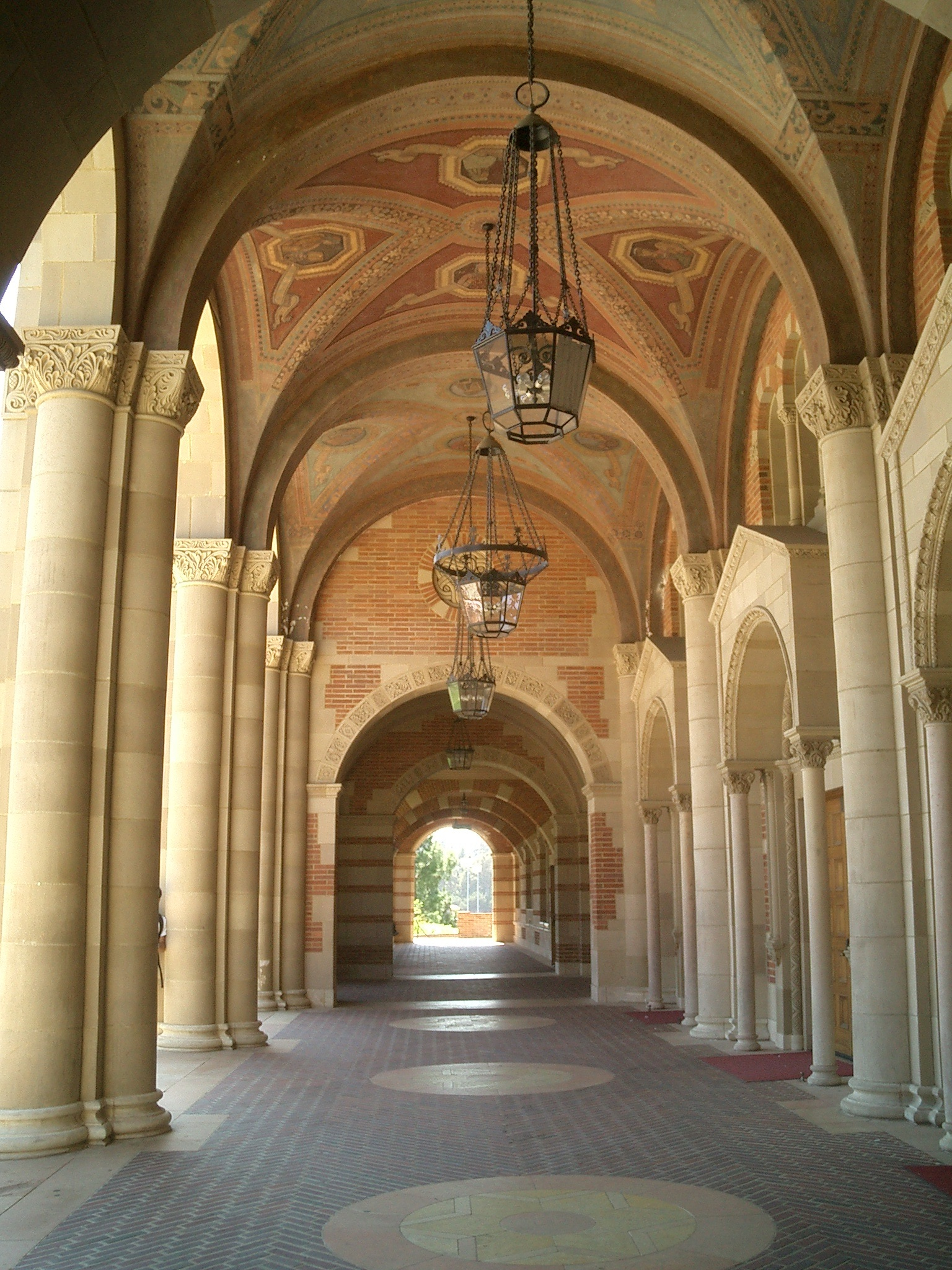
Vaulted arches of Royce Hall

The first buildings were designed by the local firm Allison & Allison. The Romanesque Revival style of these first four structures remained the predominant building style until the 1950s, when architect Welton Becket was hired to supervise the expansion of the campus over the next two decades. Romanesque Revival was chosen as an alternative to Collegiate Gothic to parallel the climate of Southern California to the warm, sunny weather of the Southern Mediterranean.

Becket greatly streamlined its general appearance, adding several rows of minimalist, slab–shaped brick buildings to the southern half, the largest of these being the UCLA Medical Center. Architects such as A. Quincy Jones, William Pereira, and Paul Williams designed many subsequent structures on the campus during the mid-20th century. More recent additions include buildings designed by architects I.M. Pei, Venturi, Scott Brown and Associates, Richard Meier, Cesar Pelli, and Rafael Vinoly. To accommodate UCLA's rapidly growing student population, multiple construction and renovation projects are in progress, including expansions of the life sciences and engineering research complexes. This continuous construction gives UCLA the nickname "Under Construction Like Always".

One notable building on campus is named after African-American alumnus Ralph Bunche, who received the 1950 Nobel Peace Prize for negotiating an armistice agreement between the Jews and Arabs in Israel. The entrance of Bunche Hall features a bust of him overlooking the Franklin D. Murphy Sculpture Garden. He was the first individual of non-European background and the first UCLA alumnus to be honored with the Prize.

The Hannah Carter Japanese Garden is located a mile north of campus, in the community of Bel Air. The garden was designed by landscape architect Nagao Sakurai of Tokyo and garden designer Kazuo Nakamura of Kyoto in 1959. The garden was donated to UCLA by former UC regent and UCLA alumnus Edward W. Carter and his wife Hannah Carter in 1964 with the stipulation that it remains open to the public. After the garden was damaged by heavy rains in 1968, UCLA Professor of Art and Campus Architect Koichi Kawana took on the task of its reconstruction. The property was sold in 2016 and public access is no longer required.

=== Filming ===
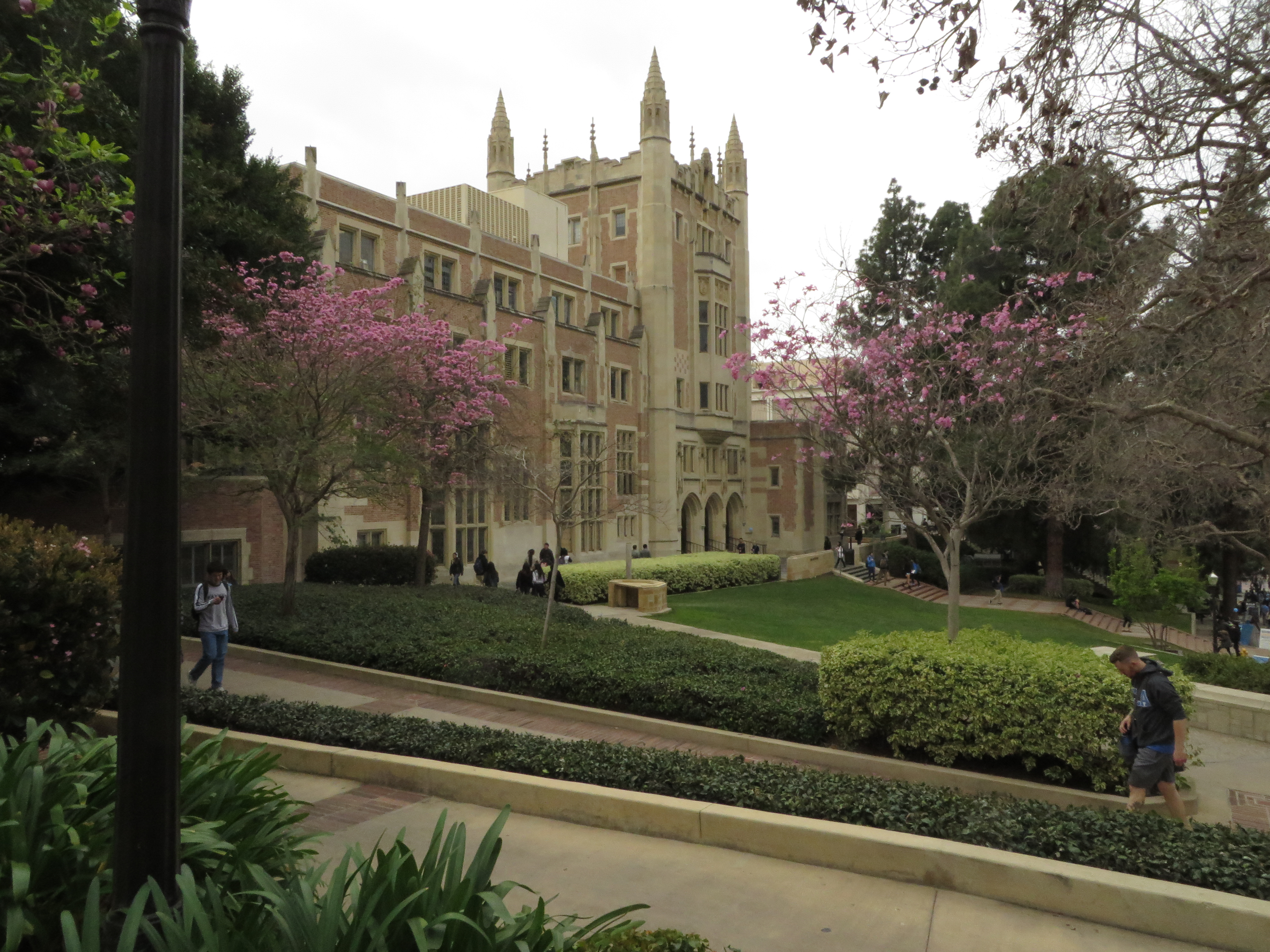
The front lawn of UCLA's Kerckhoff Hall, as seen during the orientation scene in Legally Blonde

UCLA has attracted filmmakers for decades with its proximity to Hollywood. It was used to represent fictional Windsor College in Scream 2 (1997). In response to frequent requests for filming at the campus, UCLA has instated a policy to regulate filming and professional photography. "UCLA is located in Los Angeles, the same place as the American motion picture industry", said UCLA visiting professor of film and television Jonathan Kuntz. "So we're convenient for (almost) all of the movie companies, TV production companies, commercial companies and so on. We're right where the action is."

== Academics ==
=== College and schools ===
College and schools of the university – with the year of their founding – include:

==== Undergraduate ====
- College of Letters and Science (1919)
- School of the Arts and Architecture (1939)
- School of Education & Information Studies (SEIS) (1881)
- Henry Samueli School of Engineering and Applied Science (HSSEAS) (1945)
- Herb Alpert School of Music (2007)
- School of Theater, Film and Television (1947)
- Joe C. Wen School of Nursing (1949)
- Luskin School of Public Affairs (1994)

==== Graduate ====
- School of Education & Information Studies (SEIS) (1881)
- School of Law (1949)
- Anderson School of Management (1935)
- Luskin School of Public Affairs (1994)
- David Geffen School of Medicine (1951)
- School of Dentistry (1964)
- Jonathan and Karin Fielding School of Public Health (1961)

=== Healthcare ===
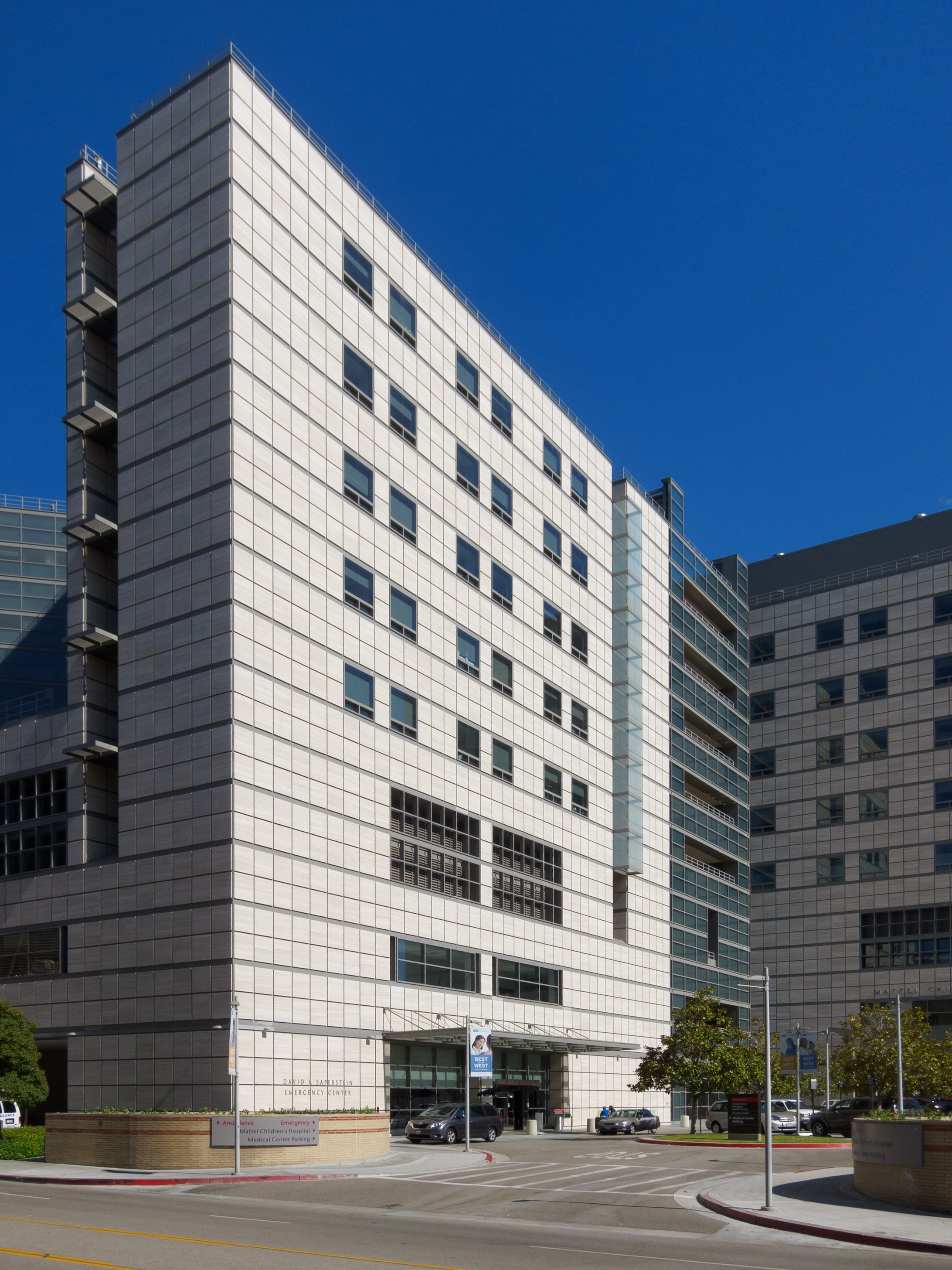
Ronald Reagan UCLA Medical Center, near the main entrance to the campus

The David Geffen School of Medicine, Joe C. Wen School of Nursing, School of Dentistry and Fielding School of Public Health constitute the professional schools of health science. The UCLA Health System operates the Ronald Reagan UCLA Medical Center, a hospital in Santa Monica and twelve primary care clinics throughout Los Angeles County. In addition, the UCLA David Geffen School of Medicine uses two Los Angeles County public hospitals as teaching hospitals—Harbor–UCLA Medical Center and Olive View–UCLA Medical Center—as well as the largest private nonprofit hospital on the west coast, Cedars-Sinai Medical Center. The Greater Los Angeles VA Medical Center is also a major teaching and training site for the university.

The UCLA Medical Center made history in 1981 when Assistant Professor Michael Gottlieb first diagnosed AIDS. UCLA medical researchers also pioneered the use of positron emission tomography (PET) scanning to study brain function. Professor of Pharmacology Louis Ignarro was one of the recipients of the 1998 Nobel Prize in Physiology or Medicine for discovering the signaling cascade of nitric oxide, one of the most important molecules in cardiopulmonary physiology. The U.S. News & World Report Best Hospitals ranking for 2021 ranks UCLA Medical Center 3rd in the United States and 1st in the West. UCLA Medical Center was ranked within the top 20 in the United States for 15 out of 16 medical specialty areas examined.

=== Research ===
UCLA is classified among "R1: Doctoral Universities – Very high research activity" and had $1.72 billion in research expenditures in 2024, ranking it 7th nationally.

=== Rankings ===
Academic rankings

National
- Forbes: 15
- U.S. News & World Report: 20
- Washington Monthly: 47
- WSJ/College Pulse: 80

Global
- ARWU: 15
- QS: 46
- THE: 18
- U.S. News & World Report: 13

National program rankings
Program	Ranking
Business	18
Part-time MBA	5
Education	5
Engineering	13
Law	12
Medical: Research	Tier 1
Medical: Primary Care	Tier 2
Nursing: Master's	9
Biological Sciences	17
Biostatistics	9
Chemistry	16
Clinical Psychology	1
Computer Science	16
Earth Sciences	14
Economics	11
English	8
Fine Arts	1
History	6
Library and Information Studies	13
Mathematics	7
Physics	17
Political Science	11
Psychology	6
Public Affairs	16
Public Health	8
Social Work	8
Sociology	6
Statistics	19

Global subject rankings
Program	Ranking
Oncology	5
Psychiatry/Psychology	12
Clinical Medicine	14
Neuroscience & Behavior	14
Mathematics	19
Arts & Humanities	12
Optics	19
Artificial Intelligence	101
Materials Science	13
Geosciences	18
Social Sciences & Public Health	23
Molecular Biology & Genetics	12
Surgery	46
Gastroenterology & Hepatology	48
Infectious Diseases	49
Biology & Biochemistry	11
Chemistry	29
Microbiology	56
Condensed Matter Physics	40
Computer Science	53
Physics	30
Environment/Ecology	28
Immunology	40
Economics & Business	38
Space Science	40
Cardiac & Cardiovascular Systems	48
Pharmacology & Toxicology	50
Plant & Animal Science	131
Engineering	69
Energy & Fuels	196
Electrical & Electronic Engineering	152

==== National ====
The 2026 U.S. News & World Report Best Colleges report ranked UCLA second among public universities and 17th among national universities. The Washington Monthly ranked UCLA 20th among national universities in 2024, with criteria based on research, community service, and social mobility. The Money Magazine Best Colleges ranking for 2015 ranked UCLA 26th in the United States, based on educational quality, affordability and alumni earnings. In 2014, The Daily Beast's Best Colleges report ranked UCLA 10th in the country. The Kiplinger Best College Values report for 2015 ranked UCLA 6th for value among American public universities. The Wall Street Journal and Times Higher Education ranked UCLA 26th among national universities in 2016. The 2013 Top American Research Universities report by the Center for Measuring University Performance ranks UCLA 11th in power, 12th in resources, faculty, and education, 14th in resources and education and 9th in education. The 2015 Princeton Review College Hopes & Worries Survey ranked UCLA as the No. 5 "Dream College" among students and the No. 10 "Dream College" among parents. The National Science Foundation ranked UCLA 6th among American universities for research and development expenditures in 2021 with $1.45 billion. In 2017 The New York Times ranked UCLA 1st for economic upward-mobility among 65 "elite" colleges in the United States.

==== Global ====
The Times Higher Education World University Rankings for 2024–25 ranks UCLA 18th in the world for academics, No. 2 US Public University for academics, and 15th in the world for reputation. In 2020, it ranked 16th among the universities around the world by SCImago Institutions Rankings. UCLA was ranked 43rd in the QS World University Rankings in 2024 and 13th in the world (11th in North America) by the Academic Ranking of World Universities (ARWU) in 2024. In 2017, the Center for World University Rankings (CWUR) ranked the university 15th in the world based on quality of education, alumni employment, quality of faculty, publications, influence, citations, broad impact, and patents. The 2025 U.S. News & World Report Best Global University Rankings report ranked UCLA 11th in the world. The CWTS Leiden ranking of universities based on scientific impact for 2017 ranks UCLA 14th in the world. The University Ranking by Academic Performance (URAP) conducted by Middle East Technical University for 2016–2017 ranked UCLA 12th in the world based on the quantity, quality and impact of research articles and citations. The Webometrics Ranking of World Universities for 2017 ranked UCLA 11th in the world based on the presence, impact, openness and excellence of its research publications.

==== Graduate school ====
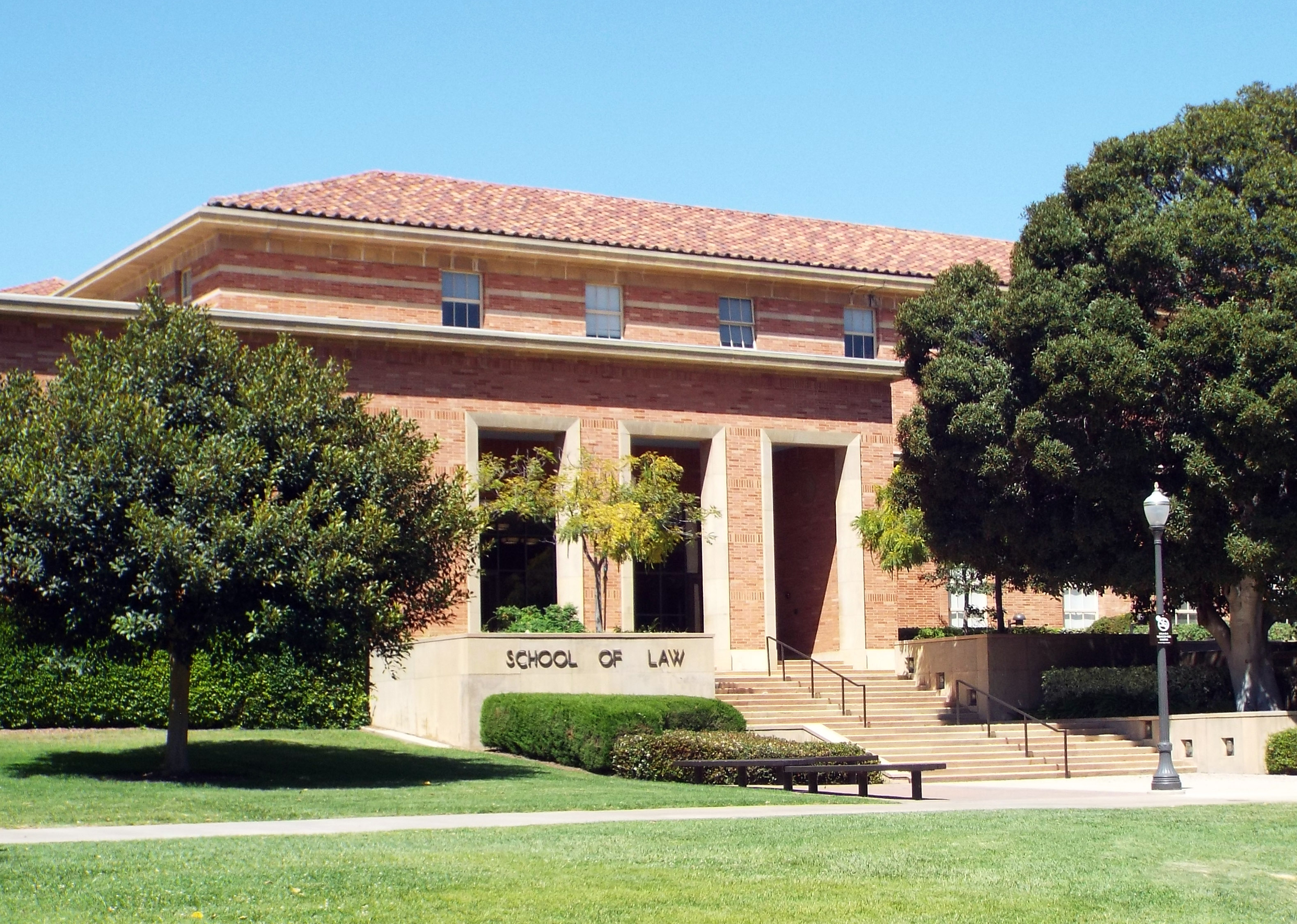
South entrance to the School of Law

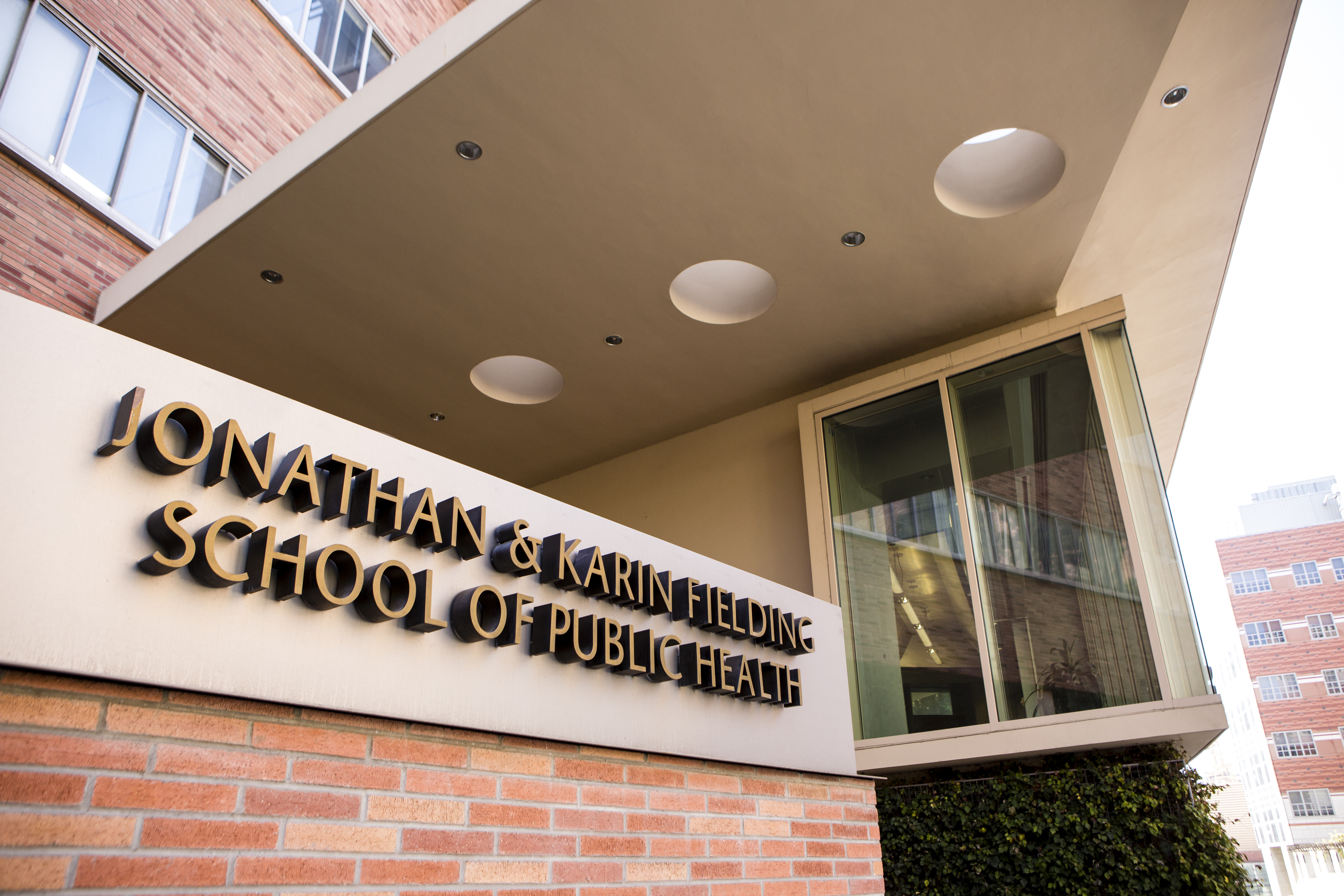
Fielding School of Public Health

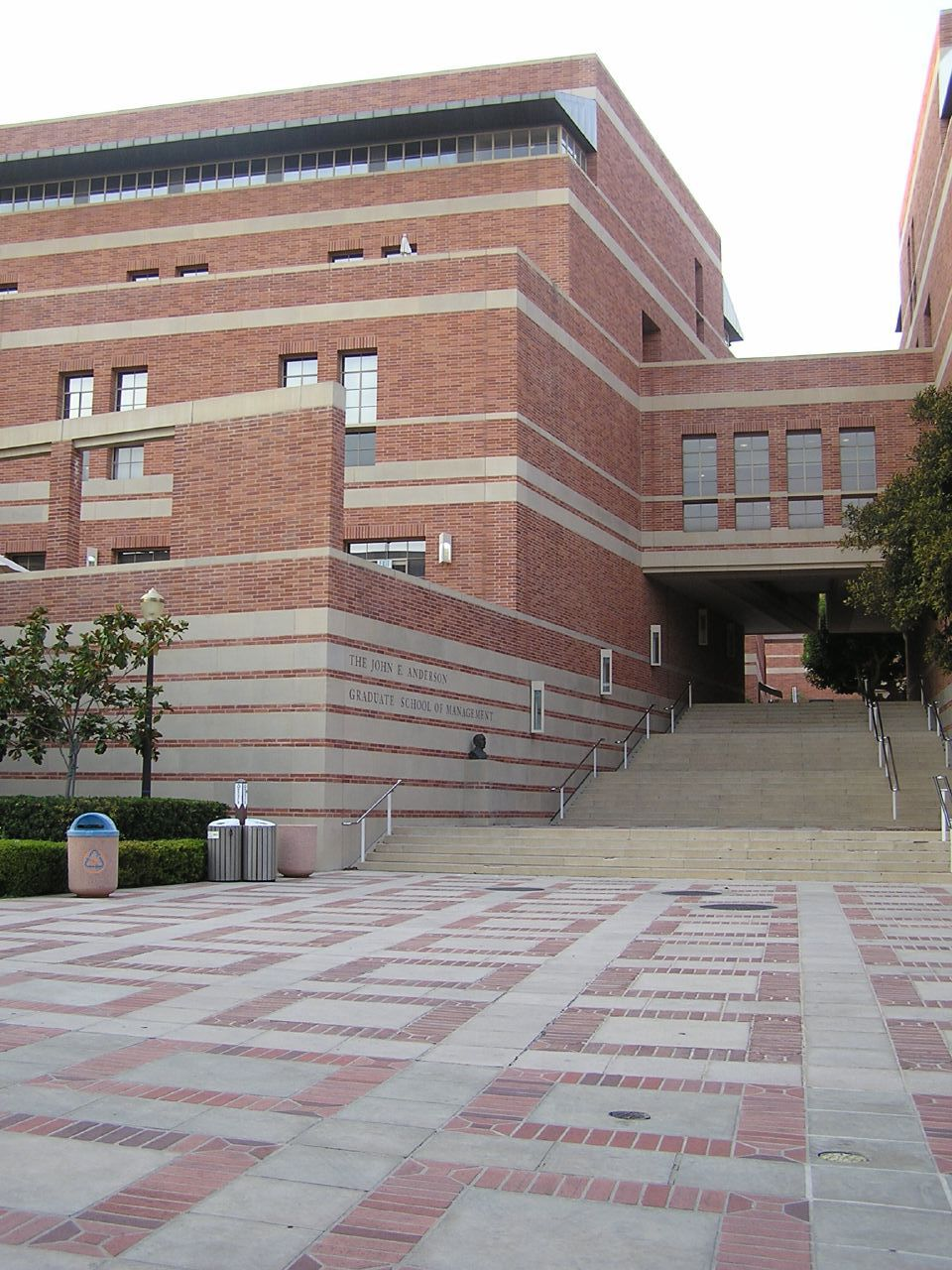
Anderson School of Management

As of March 2021, the U.S. News & World Report Best Graduate Schools report ranked the Graduate School of Education and Information Studies (GSEIS) 3rd, the Anderson School of Management 18th, the David Geffen School of Medicine tied for 12th for Primary Care and 21st for Research, the School of Law 14th, the Henry Samueli School of Engineering and Applied Science (HSSEAS) 16th, the Jonathan and Karin Fielding School of Public Health 10th, and the Joe C. Wen School of Nursing 16th. The QS Global 200 MBA Rankings report for 2015 ranks the Anderson School of Management 9th among North American business schools. The 2014 Economist ranking of Full-time MBA programs ranks the Anderson School of Management 13th in the world. The 2014 Financial Times ranking of MBA programs ranks the Anderson School 26th in the world. The 2014 Bloomberg Businessweek ranking of Full-time MBA programs ranks the Anderson School of Management 11th in the United States. The 2014 Business Insider ranking of the world's best business schools ranks the Anderson School of Management 20th in the world. The 2014 Eduniversal Business Schools Ranking ranks the Anderson School of Management 15th in the United States. In 2015, career website Vault ranked the Anderson School of Management 16th among American business schools, and the School of Law 15th among American law schools. In 2015, financial community website QuantNet ranked the Anderson School of Management's Master of Financial Engineering program 12th among North American financial engineering programs. The U.S. News & World Report Best Online Programs report for 2016 ranked the Henry Samueli School of Engineering and Applied Science (HSSEAS) 1st among online graduate engineering programs.

==== Departmental ====
Departments ranked in the national top ten by the 2025 U.S. News & World Report Best Graduate Schools report are Clinical Psychology (1st), Fine Arts (1st), Education (5th), Psychology (6th), Math (7th), History (6th), Sociology (6th), English (8th), Public Health (8th), and Nursing: Master's (9th). Departments ranked in the global top 30 by the 2025 U.S. News & World Report Best Global Universities report are Arts and Humanities (12th), Biology and Biochemistry (11th), Chemistry (29th), Clinical Medicine (14th), Materials Science (13th), Mathematics (19th), Neuroscience and Behavior (14th), Psychiatry/Psychology (12th) and Social Sciences and Public Health (23rd).

Departments ranked in the global top ten by the Academic Ranking of World Universities (ARWU) for 2015 are Mathematics (8th) and Computer Science (9th). Departments ranked in the global top ten by the QS World University Rankings for 2020 are English Language & Literature (9th), Linguistics (10th), Modern Languages (7th), Medicine (7th), Psychology (6th), Mathematics (9th), Geography (7th), Communications & Media Studies (13th), Education (11th) and Sociology (7th).

==== Academic field ====
Academic field rankings in the global top ten according to the Academic Ranking of World Universities (ARWU) for 2025 are Atmospheric Science (6th), Clinical Medicine (7th), Human Biological Sciences (9th), Electrical and Electronic Engineering (9th), Materials Science & Engineering (9th), Dentistry & Oral Sciences (10th). Academic field rankings in the global top 20 according to the Times Higher Education World University Rankings for 2024–25 include Psychology (11th), Education Studies (13th), Arts & Humanities (14th), Medical and Health (14th), Engineering (16th), Physical Sciences (17th), Computer Science (17th), Social Sciences (15th), and Business & Economics (20th). Academic field rankings in the global top ten according to the QS World University Rankings for 2015 are Arts & Humanities (10th) and Life Sciences and Medicine (10th).

==== Student body ====
The Institute of International Education ranked UCLA the American university with the seventh-most international students in 2016 (behind NYU, USC, Arizona State, Columbia University, The University of Illinois, and Northeastern University). In 2014, Business Insider ranked UCLA 5th in the world for the number of alumni working at Google (behind Stanford, Berkeley, Carnegie Mellon, and MIT). In 2015, Business Insider ranked UCLA 10th among American universities with the most students hired by Silicon Valley companies. In 2015, research firm PitchBook ranked UCLA 9th in the world for venture capital raised by undergraduate alumni, and 11th in the world for producing the most MBA graduate alumni who are entrepreneurs backed by venture capital.

=== Library system ===
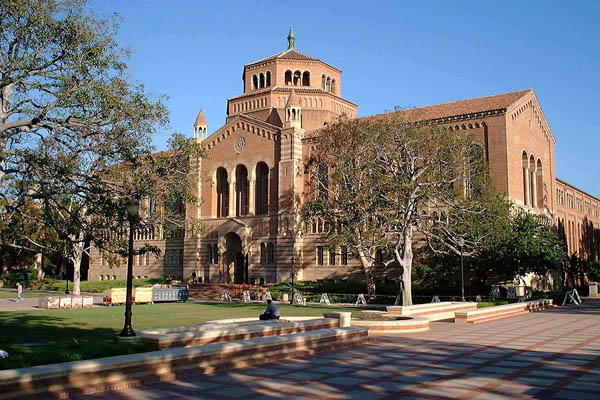
Powell Library, across the quad from Royce Hall

UCLA's library system has over nine million books and 70,000 serials in over twelve libraries and eleven other archives, reading rooms, and research centers. It is the United States' 12th largest library in number of volumes. The first library, University Library (presently Powell Library), was founded in 1884. Lawrence Powell became librarian in 1944, and began a series of system overhauls and modifications, and in 1959, was named Dean of the School of Library Service. More libraries were added as previous ones filled.

=== Medical school admissions ===
According to the Association of American Medical Colleges (AAMC), UCLA supplies the most undergraduate applicants to U.S. medical schools among all American universities. In 2015, UCLA supplied 961 medical school applicants, followed by UC Berkeley with 819 and the University of Florida with 802. Among first-time medical school applicants who received their bachelor's degree from UCLA in 2014, 51% were admitted to at least one U.S. medical school.

== Admissions ==
=== Undergraduate ===
Undergraduate admission statistics
	Fall 2025	Fall 2024	Fall 2023	Fall 2022	Fall 2021
First-time Freshmen
Applicants	145,060	146,272	145,903	149,801	139,482
Admits	13,659	13,114	12,736	12,844	15,028
Admit rate	9%	9%	9%	9%	11%
Enrolled	6,551	6,610	6,585	6,462	6,584
Yield rate	48%	50%	52%	50%	44%
Transfers
Applicants	28,301	27,178	23,979	24,943	28,464
Admits	6,466	6,177	6,190	5,961	5,435
Admit rate	23%	23%	26%	24%	19%
Enrolled	3,933	3,833	3,701	3,645	3,434
Yield rate	61%	62%	60%	61%	63%

U.S. News & World Report rates UCLA "Most Selective", and the Princeton Review rates its admissions selectivity of 89 out of 99. 149,815 prospective freshmen applied for fall 2021, the most of any four-year university in the United States.

Admission rates vary according to the residency of applicants. For fall 2019, California residents had an admission rate of 12.0%, while out-of-state U.S. residents had an admission rate of 16.4% and internationals had an admission rate of 8.4%. UCLA's overall freshman admit rate for the fall 2019 term was 12.3%.

As of 2020, the basis for selection at UCLA includes several academic and nonacademic factors. Those considered "very important" are all academic; they are rigor of secondary school record, academic GPA, standardized test scores, and application essay(s). Those considered "important" are talent/ability, character/personal qualities, volunteer work, work experience, and extracurricular activities. Factors that are not considered at all include class rank, interviews, alumni relation, and racial/ethnic status. UCLA is need-blind for domestic applicants.

Enrolled freshmen for fall 2024 had a median unweighted UC GPA of 4.00, and a median weighted UC GPA of 4.60, calculated from grades received in their second and third years of high school. Among the admitted freshman applicants for the fall 2024 term, 50.4% chose to enroll at UCLA.

UCLA's freshman admission rate varies drastically across colleges. For fall 2024, the College of Letters and Science had an admission rate of 10.9%, the Henry Samueli School of Engineering and Applied Science (HSSEAS) had an admission rate of 5.3%, the Herb Alpert School of Music had an admission rate of 19.9%, the School of the Arts and Architecture had an admission rate of 5.5%, the Joe C. Wen School of Nursing had an admission rate of 0.95%, and the School of Theater, Film and Television had an admission rate of 3.7%.

One of the major issues is the decreased admission of African Americans since the passage of Proposition 209 in 1996, prohibiting state governmental institutions from considering race, sex, or ethnicity, specifically in the areas of public employment, public contracting, and public education. UCLA responded by shifting to a holistic admissions process in fall 2007, which evaluates applicants based on their opportunities in high school, personal hardships, and unusual circumstances at home.

=== Graduate ===
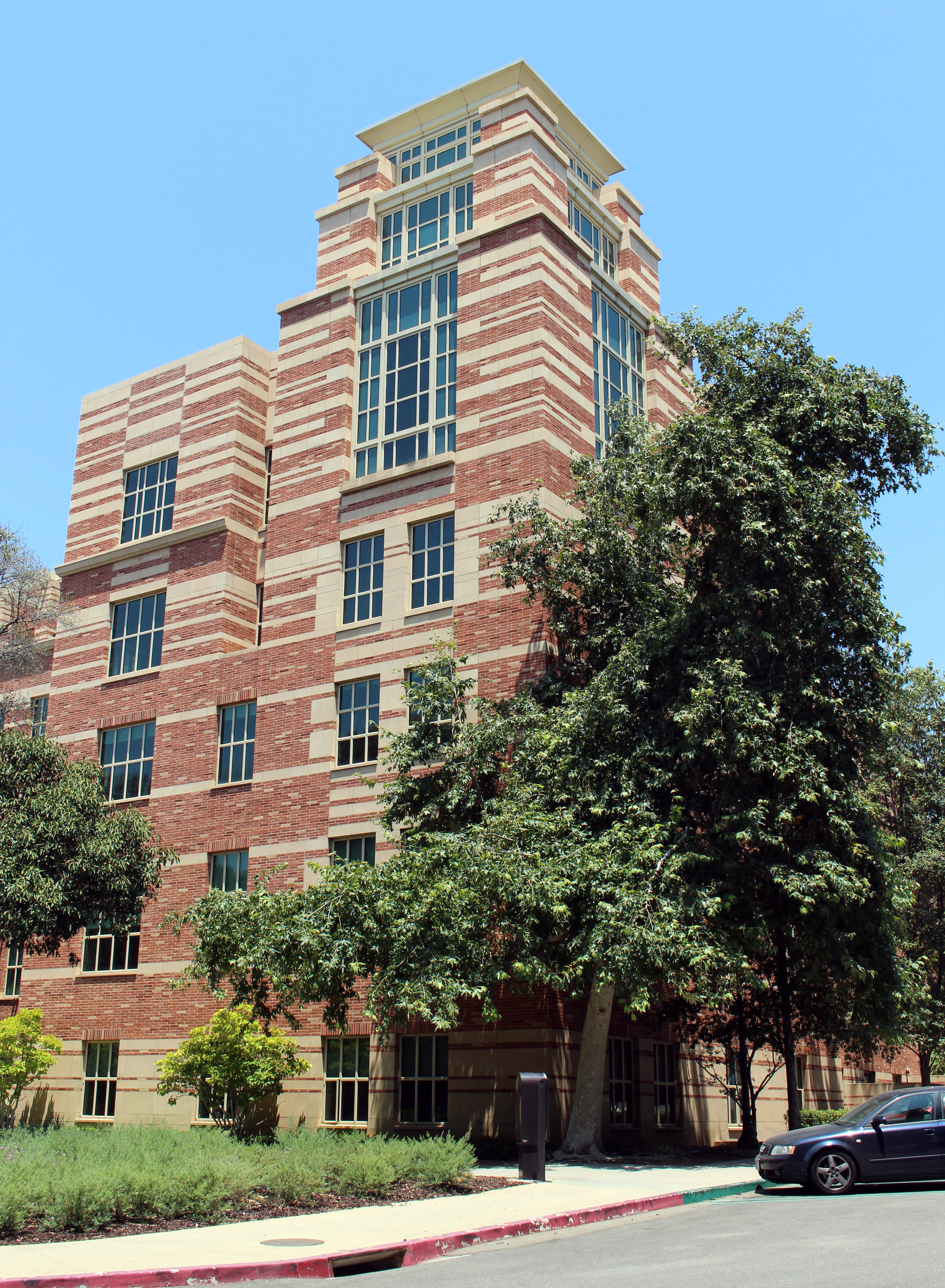
Hugh and Hazel Darling Law Library, UCLA School of Law

For fall 2024, the David Geffen School of Medicine admitted 3.29% of its 11,329 applicants, making it the 10th most selective U.S. medical school. The School of Law had a median undergraduate GPA of 3.82 and median Law School Admission Test (LSAT) score of 170 for the enrolled class of 2024. The Anderson School of Management had a middle-80% GPA range of 3.1–3.8 and an average Graduate Management Admission Test (GMAT) score of 714 for the enrolled MBA class of 2026.

The School of Dentistry had an average overall GPA of 3.87, an average science GPA of 3.84 and an average Dental Admissions Test (DAT) score of 23 for the enrolled class of 2028. The Graduate School of Nursing has an acceptance rate of 33% as of 2022. For fall 2020, the Henry Samueli School of Engineering and Applied Science (HSSEAS) had a graduate acceptance rate of 27%.

== Economic impact ==
The university has a significant impact in the Los Angeles economy. It is the fifth largest employer in the county (after Los Angeles County, the Los Angeles Unified School District, the federal government and the City of Los Angeles) and the seventh largest in the region. UCLA consistently has the highest revenue of all the universities in University of California system.

=== Trademarks and licensing ===
The UCLA trademark "is the exclusive property of the Regents of the University of California", but it is managed, protected, and licensed through UCLA Trademarks and Licensing, a division of the Associated Students UCLA, the largest student employer on campus. As such, the ASUCLA also has a share in trademark profits.

Apparel, fashion accessories and other items with UCLA'S logo and insignea are popular in many parts of the world due to both the university's academic and athletic prestige, and its association with colorful images of Southern California life and culture. This demand for UCLA-branded merchandise has inspired the licensing of its trademark to UCLA brand stores throughout Europe, the Middle East and Asia. Since 1980, 15 UCLA stores have opened in South Korea, and 49 are currently open in China. The newest store recently opened in Kuwait; there are also stores in Mexico, Singapore and India. UCLA earns about $400,000 in royalties each year through its international licensing program.

=== Commerce on campus ===
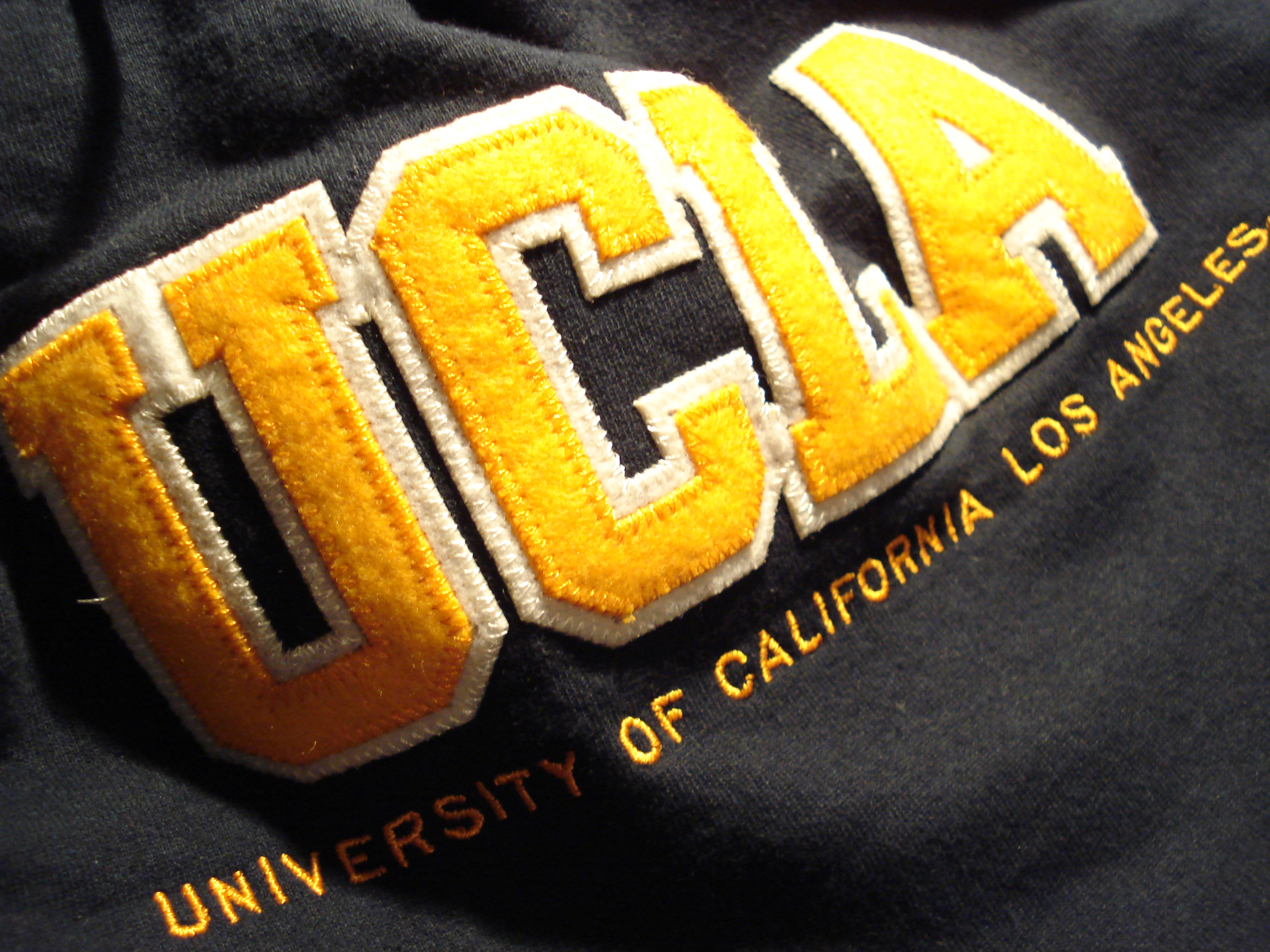
A hoodie from the UCLA Store

UCLA has various store locations around campus, with the main store in Ackerman Union. In addition, UCLA-themed products are sold at the gift shop of Fowler Museum on campus. Due to licensing and trademarks, products with UCLA logos and insignia are usually higher priced than their unlicensed counterparts. These products are popular among visitors, who buy them as gifts and souvenirs. The UCLA store offers some products, such as notebooks and folders, in both licensed (logoed) and cheaper unlicensed (un-logoed) options, but for other products the latter option is often unavailable. Students employed part-time by ASUCLA at UCLA Stores and Restaurants receive discounts when they shop at UCLA Stores.

== Athletics ==
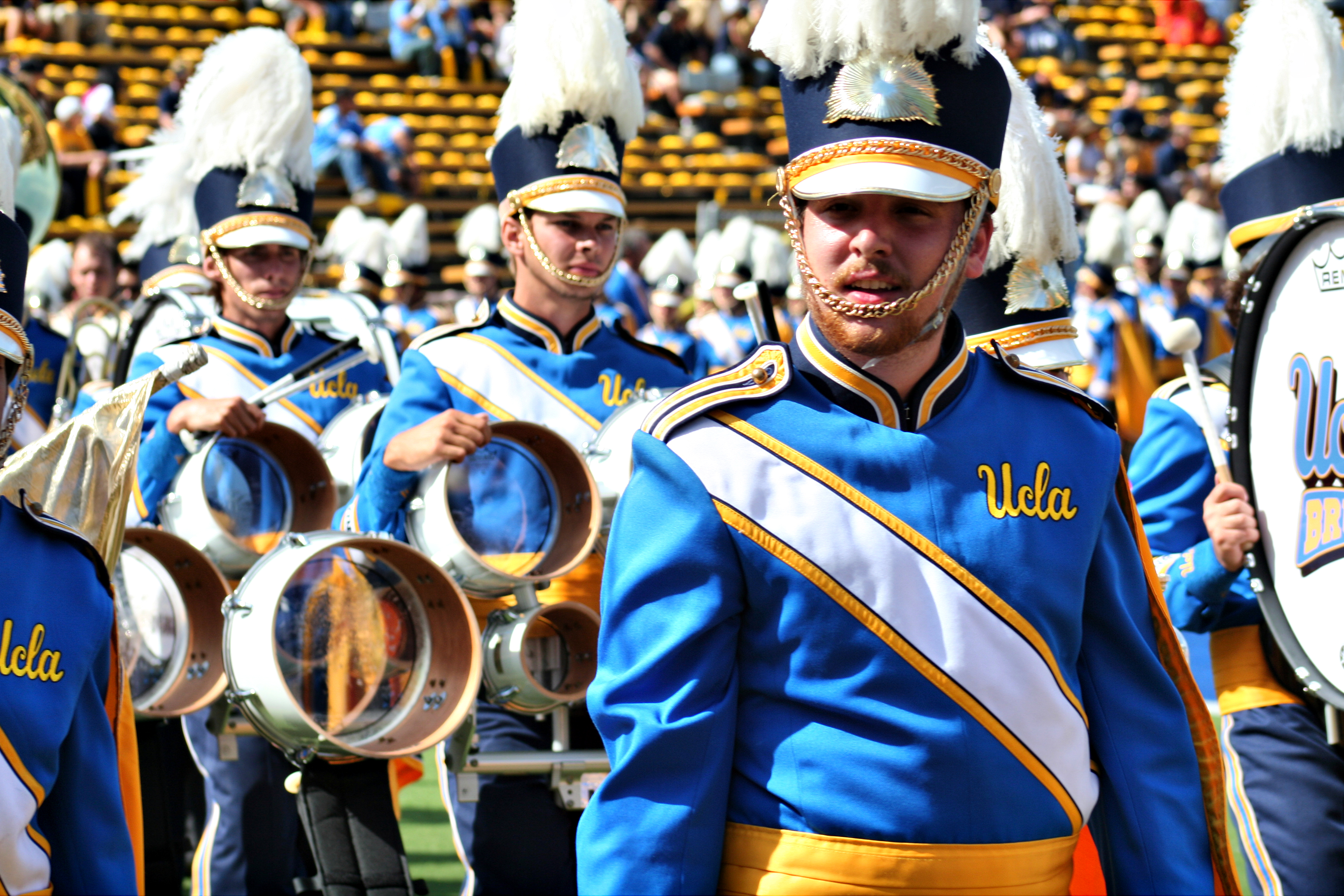
The Solid Gold Sound of the UCLA Bruin Marching Band

The school's sports teams are called the Bruins, represented by the colors true blue and gold. The Bruins participate in NCAA Division I as part of the Big Ten Conference. Two notable sports facilities serve as home venues for UCLA sports. The Bruin men's football team plays home games at the Rose Bowl in Pasadena; the team won a national title in 1954. The basketball and volleyball teams, and the women's gymnastics team compete at Pauley Pavilion on campus. The school also sponsors cross country, soccer, women's rowing, golf, tennis, water polo, track and field, and women's softball.

The mascots are Joe and Josephine Bruin, and the fight songs are Sons of Westwood and Mighty Bruins. The alma mater is Hail to the Hills of Westwood. When Henry "Red" Sanders came to UCLA to coach football in 1949, the uniforms were redesigned. Sanders added a gold loop on the shoulders—the UCLA Stripe. The navy blue was changed to a lighter shade of blue. Sanders figured that the baby blue would look better on the field and in film. He dubbed the uniform "Powder Keg Blue", a powder blue with an explosive kick. This would also differentiate UCLA from all other UC teams, whose official colors are blue and gold.

UCLA competes in all major Division I sports and has won 136 national championships, including 126 NCAA championships. Only Stanford University has more NCAA team championships, with 135. On April 21, 2018, UCLA's women's gymnastics team defeated Oklahoma Sooners to win its 7th NCAA National Championship as well as UCLA's 115th overall team title. Most recently, UCLA's women's soccer team defeated Florida State to win its first NCAA National Championship along with women's tennis who defeated North Carolina to win its second NCAA National title ever. UCLA's softball program is also outstanding. Women's softball won their NCAA-leading 12th National Championship, on June 4, 2019. The women's water polo team is also dominant, with a record 7 NCAA championships. Notably, the team helped UCLA become the first school to win 100 NCAA championships overall when they won their fifth on May 13, 2007.

The men's water polo team won UCLA's 112th, 113th, 114th, 124th and 125th national championships, defeating USC in the championship game seven times: 1996, on December 7, 2014, on December 6, 2015, on December 3, 2017, 2020, on December 8, 2024, and on December 7, 2025. On October 9, 2016, the top-ranked men's water polo team broke the NCAA record for consecutive wins when they defeated UC Davis for their 52nd straight win. This toppled Stanford's previous record of 51 consecutive wins set in 1985–87. The men's water polo team has become a dominant sport on campus with a total of 13 national championships.

Among UCLA's 123 championship titles, some of the more notable victories are in men's basketball. Under legendary coach John Wooden, UCLA men's basketball teams won 10 NCAA championships, including a record seven consecutive, in 1964, 1965, 1967–1973, and 1975, and an 11th was added under then-coach Jim Harrick in 1995 (through 2008, the most consecutive by any other team is two). From 1971 to 1974, UCLA men's basketball won an unprecedented 88 consecutive games. UCLA has also shown dominance in men's volleyball, with 21 national championships. The first 19 teams were led by former coach Al Scates. UCLA is one of only six universities (Michigan, Stanford, Ohio State, California, and Florida being the others) to have won national championships in all three major men's sports (baseball, basketball, and football).

=== USC rivalry ===
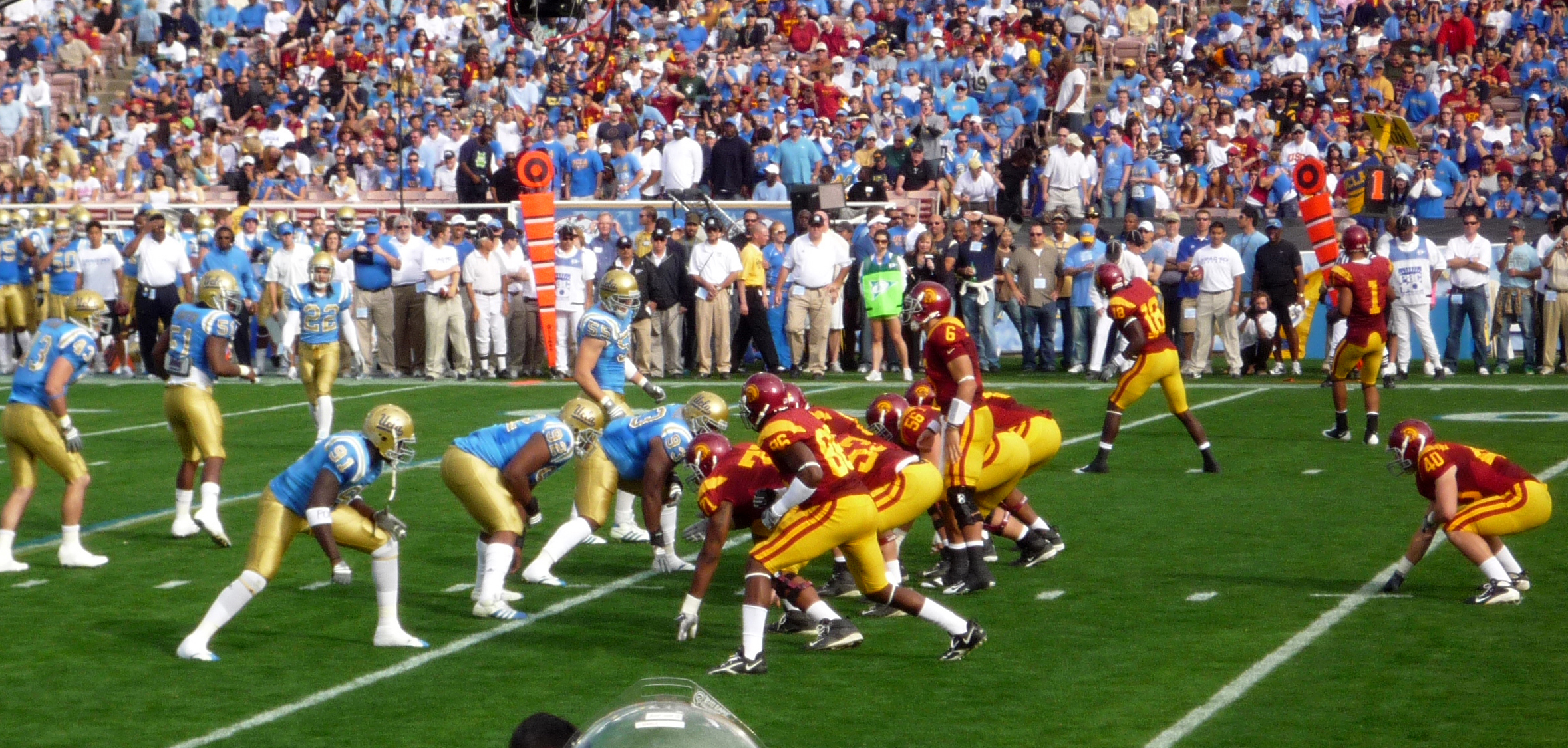
A UCLA-USC rivalry game

UCLA shares a traditional sports rivalry with the University of Southern California. UCLA teams have won the second-most NCAA Division I-sanctioned team championships, while USC has the third-most. Only Stanford University, a former conference opponent also located in California, has more than either UCLA or USC. The football rivalry is distinctive for two of the strongest conference programs located in one city. In football, UCLA has one national champion team and 16 conference titles, compared to USC's 11 national championships and 37 conference championships. The two football teams compete for annual possession of the Victory Bell, the trophy of the rivalry football game.

The schools share a rivalry in many other sports, and are each the best in the nation for many. UCLA has won 19 NCAA Championships in men's volleyball, 11 in men's basketball, 12 in Softball, and 7 in women's water polo, the most of any school in those sports. USC has won 26 NCAA Championships in Men's Outdoor Track and Field, 21 in men's tennis, and 12 in baseball, also the most of any school in each respective sport. The annual SoCal BMW Crosstown Cup compares the two schools based on their performance in 19 varsity sports; UCLA has won five times and USC has won nine times. This rivalry extends to the Olympic Games, where UCLA athletes have won 250 medals over a span of 50 years, while USC athletes have won 287 over 100 years. UCLA and USC also compete in the We Run The City 5K, an annual charity race to raise donations for Special Olympics Southern California. The race is located on the campus of one of the schools and switches to the other campus each year. USC won the race in 2013 and 2015, while UCLA won the race in 2012, 2014, 2016, and 2017.

== Student life ==
Undergraduate demographics as of fall 2024
Race and ethnicity	Total
Asian	34.4%
White	23.9%
Hispanic	22.9%
Foreign national	7.7%
Black	6.8%
Unknown	3.2%
Native American	.8%
Native Hawaiian/Pacific Islander	.4%
Economic diversity
Low-income (Note: The percentage of students who received an income-based federal Pell grant intended for low-income students.)	27%
Affluent (Note: The percentage of students who are a part of the American middle class at the bare minimum.)	73%

The campus is located near prominent entertainment venues such as the Getty Center, the Los Angeles County Museum of Art (LACMA) and the Santa Monica Pier. UCLA offers classical orchestras, intramural sports, and over 1000 student organizations. UCLA is also home to 66 fraternities and sororities, which represent 13% of the undergraduate population. Phrateres, a non-exclusive social-service club for women was founded here in 1924 by the Dean of Women, Helen Matthewson Laughlin. Students and staff participate in dinghy sailing, surfing, windsurfing, rowing, and kayaking at the UCLA Marina Aquatic Center in Marina del Rey.

UCLA is home to a number of performing arts groups, including an improv comedy team called Rapid Fire. UCLA's first contemporary a cappella group, Awaken A Cappella, was founded in 1992. The all-male group, Bruin Harmony, has enjoyed a successful career since its inception in 2006, portraying a collegiate a cappella group in The Social Network (2010), while the ScatterTones finished in second-place in the International Championship of Collegiate A Cappella (ICCA) in 2012, 2013, and 2014, and third-place in 2017, 2019, and 2022. In 2020, The A Cappella Archive ranked the ScatterTones at #2 among all ICCA-competing groups. Resonance, founded in 2012, was an ICCA finalist in 2021. Other a cappella groups include Signature, Random Voices, Medleys, YOUTHphonics, Deviant Voices, AweChords, Pitch Please, Da Verse, Naya Zaamana, Jewkbox, On That Note, Tinig Choral, and Cadenza. YOUTHphonics and Medleys are UCLA's only nonprofit service-oriented a cappella groups.

There are a variety of cultural organizations on campus, such as Nikkei Student Union (NSU), Japanese Student Association (JSA), Association of Chinese Americans (ACA), Chinese Students and Scholars Association (CSSA), Chinese Music Ensemble (CME), Chinese Cultural Dance Club (CCDC), Taiwanese American Union (TAU), Taiwanese Student Association (TSA), Hong Kong Student Society (HKSS), Hanoolim Korean Cultural Awareness Group, Samahang Pilipino, Vietnamese Student Union (VSU), and Thai Smakom. Many of these organizations have an annual "culture night" consisting of drama and dance which raises awareness of culture and history to the campus and community.

Additionally, there are over twenty LGBTQ organizations on campus, including the undergraduate student organizations Queer Alliance, BlaQue, Lavender Health Alliance, OutWrite Newsmagazine, Queer and Trans in STEM (qtSTEM), and Transgender UCLA Pride (TransUP) as well as the graduate student organizations Out@Anderson, OUTLaw, and Luskin PRIDE. Notably, OutWrite, established under the name TenPercent in 1979, is the first college queer newsmagazine in the country. The UCLA Center for LGBTQ+ Advocacy, Research & Health was founded in 2020. UCLA operates on a quarter calendar with the exception of the UCLA School of Law and the UCLA School of Medicine, which operate on a semester calendar.

=== Traditions ===
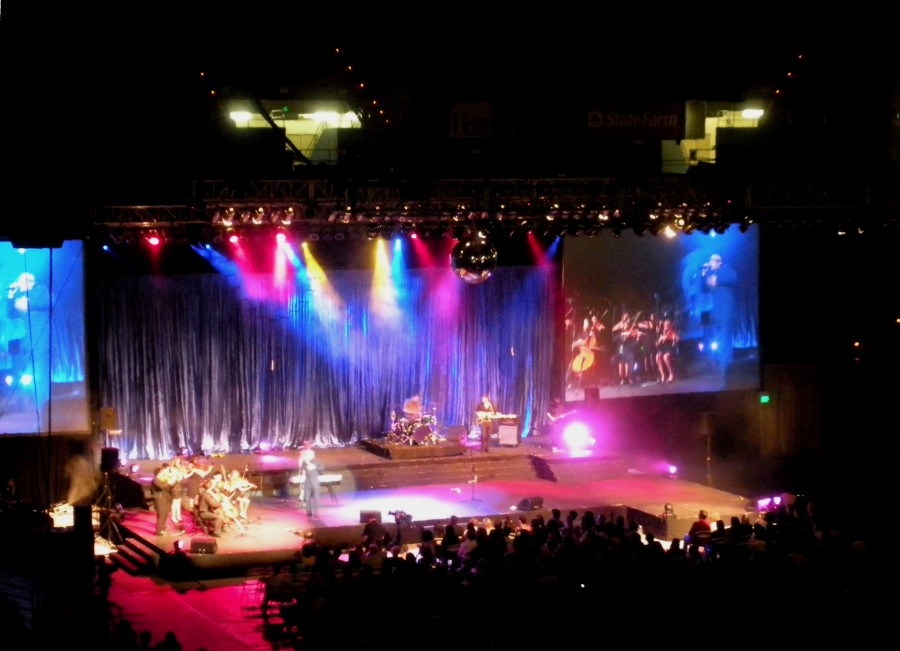
UCLA Spring Sing in 2009

UCLA's official charity is UniCamp, founded in 1934. It is a week-long summer camp for underserved children from the greater Los Angeles area, with UCLA volunteer counselors. UniCamp runs for seven weeks throughout the summer at Camp River Glen in the San Bernardino National Forest. Because UniCamp is a non-profit organization, student volunteers from UCLA also fundraise money throughout the year to allow these children to attend summer camp.

The Pediatric AIDS Coalition organizes the annual Dance Marathon in Pauley Pavilion, where thousands of students raise a minimum of $250 and dance for 26 hours to support the Elizabeth Glaser Pediatric AIDS Foundation, Project Kindle, and the UCLA AIDS Institute. Dancers are not allowed to sit (except to use the restroom) during the marathon, literally taking a stand against pediatric AIDS, and symbolizing the suffering of affected children around the world. In 2015, Dance Marathon at UCLA raised $446,157.

During Finals Week, UCLA students participate in "Midnight Scream", where they yell as loudly as possible for a few minutes at midnight to release some stress from studying. The quarterly Undie Run takes place during the Wednesday evening of Finals Week, when students run through the campus in their underwear or in skimpy costumes. With the increasing safety hazards and Police and Administration involvement, a student committee changed the route to a run through campus to Shapiro Fountain, which culminates with students dancing in the fountain. The Undie Run has spread to other American universities, including the University of Texas at Austin, Arizona State University, and Syracuse University.

The Alumni Association sponsors several events, usually large extravaganzas involving huge amounts of coordination, such as the 70-year-old Spring Sing, organized by the Student Alumni Association (SAA). UCLA's oldest tradition, Spring Sing is an annual gala of student talent, which is held at either Pauley Pavilion or the outdoor Los Angeles Tennis Center. The committee bestows the George and Ira Gershwin Lifetime Achievement Award each year to a major contributor to the music industry. Past recipients have included Stevie Wonder, Frank Sinatra, Ella Fitzgerald, James Taylor, Ray Charles, Natalie Cole, Quincy Jones, Lionel Richie, and in 2009, Julie Andrews. The Dinner for 12 Strangers is a gathering of students, alumni, administration and faculty to network around different interests. The "Beat 'SC Bonfire and Rally" occurs the week before the USC rivalry football game.

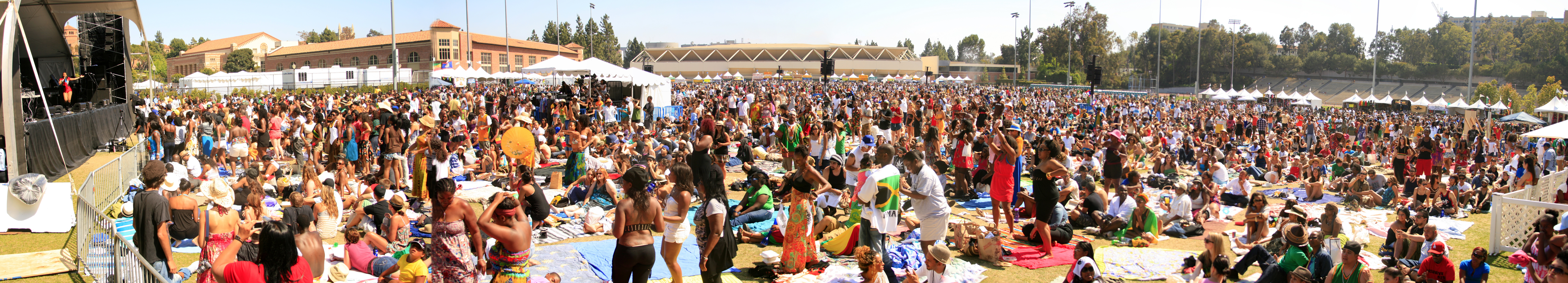
JazzReggae Festival 2010.

The USAC Cultural Affairs Commission hosts the JazzReggae Festival, a two-day concert on Memorial Day weekend that attracts more than 20,000 attendees. The JazzReggae Festival is the largest entirely student produced and run event of its kind on the West Coast.

Sigma Eta Pi and Bruin Entrepreneurs organize LA Hacks, an annual hackathon where students from around the United States come to build technology products. LA Hacks established itself as the largest hackathon in the United States when over 1500 students participated on April 11–13, 2014. LA Hacks also holds the record for the most funds raised via corporate sponsorships, with $250,000 raised. Some of the tech world's most prominent people have given talks and judged projects at LA Hacks, including Evan Spiegel (founder and CEO of Snapchat), Alexis Ohanian (co-founder of Reddit), Sam Altman (president of Y Combinator) and Chris De Wolfe (founder of Myspace).

=== Student government ===
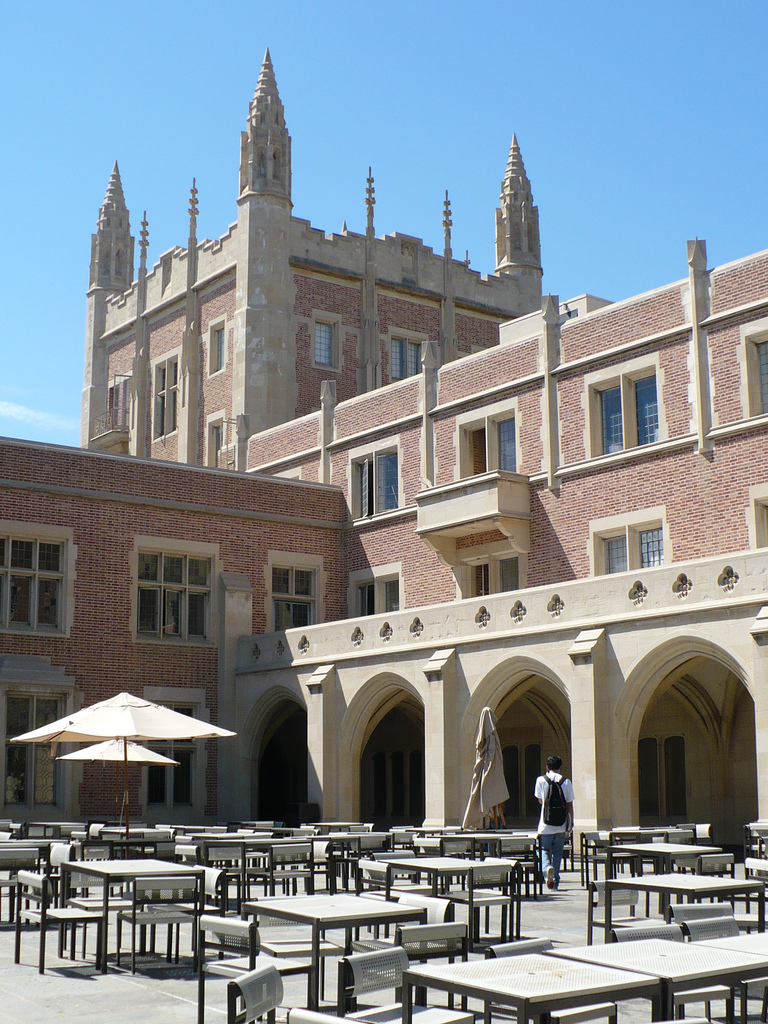
Kerckhoff Hall houses the student government and the Daily Bruin.

The Associated Students UCLA (ASUCLA) encompasses the student government and student-led enterprises at UCLA. ASUCLA has four major components: the Undergraduate Students Association, the Graduate Students Association, Student Media, and Services & Enterprises. However, in common practice, the term ASUCLA refers to the services and enterprises component. This includes the Student Store, Bookstore, Food Services, Student Union, etc. These commercial enterprises generate approximately $40 million in annual revenues. As a nonprofit corporation, the financial goal of ASUCLA is to provide quality services and programs for students. ASUCLA is governed by a student-majority Board of Directors. The Undergraduate Students Association and Graduate Students Association each appoint three members plus one alternative. In addition to the student members, there are representatives appointed by the administration, the academic senate, and the alumni association. The "services and enterprises" portion of ASUCLA is run by a professional executive director who oversees some 300 staff and 2,000 student employees.

The Graduate Students Association is the governing body for approximately 13,000 graduate and professional students at UCLA. The Undergraduate Students Association Council (USAC) is the governing body of the Undergraduate Students Association (USA) whose membership comprises every UCLA undergraduate student. As of 2015, the student body had two major political slates: Bruins United and Let's Act. In the Spring 2016 election, the two competing parties were Bruins United and Waves of Change—a smaller faction that broke off of Lets Act.

USAC's fifteen student officers and commissioners are elected by members of the Undergraduate Students Association at an annual election held during spring quarter. In addition to its fifteen elected members, USAC includes appointed representatives of the administration, the alumni, and the faculty, as well as two ex-officio members, the ASUCLA executive director, and a student finance committee chairperson, who is appointed by the USAC president and approved by USAC. All members of USAC may participate fully in council deliberations, but only the elected officers, minus the USAC president may vote. Along with the council, the student government also includes a seven-member judicial board, which, similar to the Supreme Court, serves as the judicial branch of government and reviews actions of the council. These seven students are appointed by the student body president and confirmed by the council.

USAC's programs offers additional services to the campus and surrounding communities. For example, each year approximately 40,000 students, faculty and staff attend programs of the Campus Events Commission, including a low-cost film program, a speakers program which presents leading figures from a wide range of disciplines, and performances by dozens of entertainers. Two to three thousand UCLA undergraduates participate annually in the more than twenty voluntary outreach programs run by the Community Service Commission. A large corps of undergraduate volunteers also participate in programs run by the Student Welfare Commission, such as AIDS Awareness, Substance Abuse Awareness, Blood Drives and CPR/First Aid Training. The film program is part of the Bruin Film Society, which is also a registered organization to host advance screenings of films during Oscars season. It hosts other events, like filmmaker panels, through its partnership with production and distribution company A24.

=== Media publications ===
UCLA Student Media is the home of UCLA's newspaper, magazines, and radio station. Most student media publications are governed by the ASUCLA Communications Board. The Daily Bruin is UCLA's most prominent student publication. Founded in 1919 under the name Cub Californian, it has since then developed into Los Angeles' third-most circulated newspaper. It has won dozens of national awards and is regularly commended for layout and content. In 2016, the paper won two National Pacemaker Awards – one for the best college newspaper in the country, and another for the best college media website in the country.

The Daily Bruin began publication in 1919, the same year that UCLA was founded.

UCLA Student Media also publishes seven special-interest news magazines: Al-Talib, Fem, Ha'Am, La Gente, Nommo, Pacific Ties, and OutWrite, a school yearbook, BruinLife, and the student-run radio station, UCLA Radio. Student groups such as The Forum for Energy Economics and Development also publish yearly journals focused on energy technologies and industries. There is also a student-run satire newspaper, The Westwood Enabler. There are also numerous graduate student-run journals at UCLA, such as Carte Italiane, Issues in Applied Linguistics, and Mediascape. Many of these publications are available through open access. The School of Law publishes the UCLA Law Review, which is currently ranked seventh among American law schools.

=== Housing ===
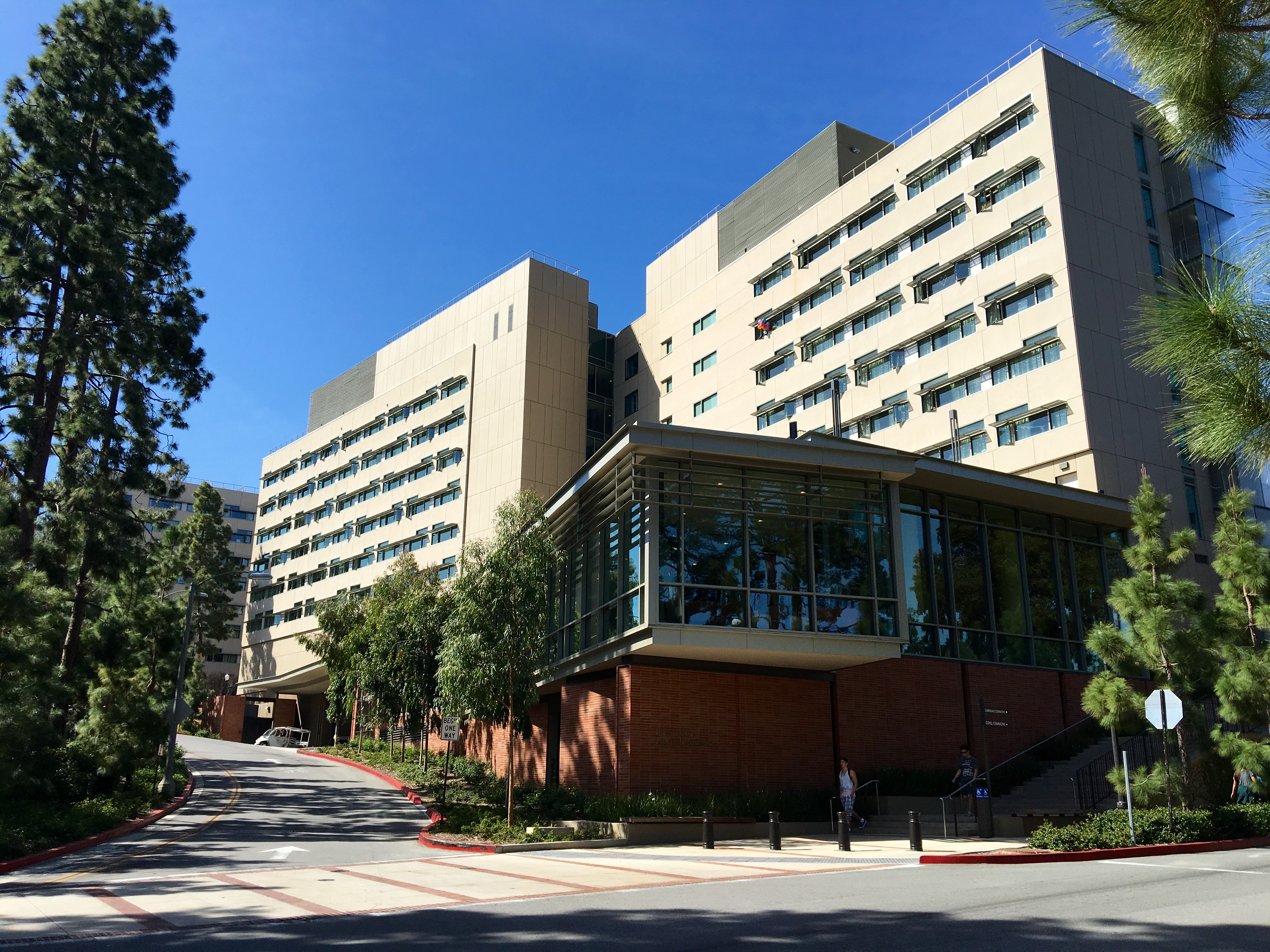
Sproul Landing dorms above B-plate dining hall at Charles E Young and De Neve Drive

UCLA provides housing to over 10,000 undergraduate and 2,900 graduate students. Most undergraduate students are housed in 14 complexes on the western side of campus, referred to by students as "The Hill". Students can live in halls, plazas, suites, or university apartments, which vary in pricing and privacy. Housing plans also offer students access to dining facilities, which have been ranked by the Princeton Review as some of the best in the United States. Dining halls are located in Covel Commons, Rieber Hall, Carnesale Commons and De Neve Plaza. In winter 2012, a dining hall called The Feast at Rieber opened to students. The newest dining hall (as of Winter Quarter 2014) is Bruin Plate, located in the Carnesale Commons (commonly referred to as Sproul Plaza). Residential cafes include Bruin Cafe, Rendezvous, The Study at Hedrick, and Cafe 1919. UCLA currently offers four years guaranteed housing to its incoming freshmen, and two years to incoming transfer students. There are four types of housing available for students: residential halls, deluxe residential halls, residential plazas, and residential suites. Available on the hill are study rooms, basketball courts, tennis courts, and Sunset Recreational Center which includes three swimming pools.

Graduate students are housed in several complexes, including the University Apartments South (UAS) and the University Apartments North (UAN). The University Apartments North (UAN) provides housing for single graduate students at the Weyburn Terrace, located southwest of the campus in Westwood Village, and the Hilgard Apartments, located on the east edge of campus on Hilgard Avenue. The University Apartments South (UAS) provides housing located approximately 5 miles south of campus in the Palms/Mar Vista area for single graduate students and students with families or dependents. Housing options for single graduate students within UAS include the Canfield Apartments, Rose Avenue, Keystone Mentone, Venice Barry and The Boulevard. The housing complex for married students, domestic partners, and students with dependents is University Village, which is located approximately 5 miles south of campus in the Palms/Mar Vista area. Qualifying undergraduate students and postdoctoral appointees with dependents, spouses or domestic partners are also eligible to live in the University Village.

Approximately 400 students live at the University Cooperative Housing Association, located two blocks off campus. Students who are involved in Greek life have the option to also live in Greek housing while at UCLA. Sorority houses are located east of campus on Hilgard Avenue, and fraternity houses are located west of campus throughout Westwood Village. A student usually lives with 50+ students in Greek housing.

=== Hospitality ===
Hospitality constituents of the university include departments not directly related to student life or administration. The Hospitality department manages the university's two on-campus hotels, the UCLA Guest House and the Meyer and Renee Luskin Conference Center. The 61-room Guest House services those visiting the university for campus-related activities. The department also manages the UCLA Conference Center, a 40-acre (0.2 km^{2}) conference center in the San Bernardino Mountains near Lake Arrowhead. Hospitality also operates UCLA Catering, a vending operation, and a summer conference center located on the Westwood campus.

=== Chabad House ===
The UCLA Chabad House is a community center for Jewish students operated by the Orthodox Jewish Chabad movement. Established in 1969, it was the first Chabad House at a university. In 1980, three students died in a fire in the original building of the UCLA Chabad House. The present building was erected in their memory. The building, completed in 1984, was the first of many Chabad houses worldwide designed as architectural reproductions of the residence of the Lubavitcher Rebbe, Rabbi Menachem Mendel Schneerson at 770 Eastern Parkway in Brooklyn, New York. The Chabad House hosts the UCLA chapter of The Rohr Jewish Learning Institute's Sinai Scholars Society.

=== Semel Healthy Campus Initiatives Center ===
In January 2013, UCLA chancellor emeritus Gene Block announced the Healthy Campus Initiative (HCI), a vision of Jane and Terry Semel, with the goal of promoting health and wellbeing among the campus's 85,000 student, faculty, and staff. In 2017, the initiative was replicated on a UC-wide basis under former University of California (UC) President Emerita Janet Napolitano to form the UC Healthy Campus Network, with an objective of making "UC the healthiest place to work, learn, and live". The initiative became an endowed center in 2018 and is now referred to as the Semel Healthy Campus Initiatives (HCI) Center.

== Notable faculty and alumni ==
UCLA's faculty and alumni have won a number of awards, including:

- 105 Academy Awards
- 278 Emmy Awards
- 1 Fields Medal
- 3 Turing Awards
- 11 Fulbright Scholars (since 2000)
- 78 Guggenheim Fellows
- 50 Grammy Awards
- 17 MacArthur Fellows
- 1 Mark Twain Prize for American Humor
- 10 National Medals of Science
- 20 Nobel laureates
- 3 Presidential Medals of Freedom
- 1 Pritzker Prize in Architecture
- 3 Pulitzer Prizes
- 1 Rome Prize in Design
- 12 Rhodes Scholars
- 1 Medal of Honor
- 2 Mitchell Scholars

As of October 2023, 29 Nobel laureates have been affiliated with UCLA: 12 professors, 9 alumni and 10 researchers (three overlaps). Two other faculty members winning the Nobel Prize were Bertrand Russell and Al Gore, who each had a short stay at UCLA.

Faculty Nobel laureates
Person	Field	Year
Guido Imbens	Economic Sciences	2021
Andrea Ghez	Physics	2020
James Fraser Stoddart	Chemistry	2016
Lloyd Shapley	Economic Sciences	2012
Louis Ignarro	Physiology or Medicine	1998
Paul Boyer	Chemistry	1997
Donald Cram	Chemistry	1987
Julian S. Schwinger	Physics	1965
Willard Libby	Chemistry	1960
Bertrand Russell	Literature	1950

The alumni Nobel laureates include Ralph Bunche (Peace, 1950), Glenn T. Seaborg (Chemistry, 1951), Robert Bruce Merrifield (Chemistry, 1984), William F. Sharpe (Economic Sciences, 1990), Elinor Ostrom (Economic Sciences, 2009), Richard F. Heck (Chemistry, 2010), Randy W. Schekman (Physiology or Medicine, 2013), and Ardem Patapoutian (Physiology or Medicine, 2021). Fifty-two UCLA professors have been awarded Guggenheim Fellowships, and seventeen are MacArthur Foundation Fellows. Mathematics professor Terence Tao was awarded the 2006 Fields Medal.

Faculty memberships (2025)
American Academy of Arts and Sciences	71
American Association for the Advancement of Science	134
American Philosophical Society	17
National Academy of Education	20
National Academy of Engineering	34
National Academy of Inventors	29
National Academy of Medicine	49
National Academy of Sciences	61

Geography professor Jared Diamond won the 1998 Pulitzer Prize for his book Guns, Germs, and Steel. Two UCLA history professors won 2008 Pulitzer Prizes for general nonfiction and history: Saul Friedländer, scholar of the Nazi Holocaust, won the prize for general nonfiction for his 2006 book, The Years of Extermination: Nazi Germany and the Jews, 1939–1945, and Daniel Walker Howe won for his 2007 book, What Hath God Wrought: The Transformation of America, 1815–1848.

A number of UCLA alumni are notable politicians. In the state of Hawaii, Ben Cayetano (1968), became the first Filipino American to be elected governor of a U.S. state. In the U.S. House of Representatives, Henry Waxman (1961, 1964) represented California's 30th congressional district and was chairman of the House Energy and Commerce Committee. U.S. Representative Judy Chu (1974) represents California's 32nd congressional district and became the first Chinese American woman elected to the U.S. Congress in 2009. Kirsten Gillibrand (1991) is a U.S. senator representing the state of New York and was a U.S. representative for New York's 20th congressional district. UCLA boasts two mayors of Los Angeles: Tom Bradley (1937–1940), the city's only African-American mayor, and Antonio Villaraigosa (1977), who served as mayor from 2005 to 2013. Nao Takasugi was the mayor of Oxnard, California and the first Asian-American California assemblyman. Azadeh Kian, PhD at UCLA and director of social sciences at University of Paris, is a prominent expert on Iranian politics.

H. R. Haldeman (1948) and John Ehrlichman (1948) are among the most infamous alumni because of their activities during the 1972 Watergate scandal. Ben Shapiro (BA 2004) is a conservative political commentator, nationally syndicated columnist, author, radio talk show host, and attorney. He is the editor-in-chief at The Daily Wire. Michael Morhaime (BA 1990), Allen Adham (BA 1990) and Frank Pearce (BA 1990) are the founders of Blizzard Entertainment, developer of the award-winning Warcraft, StarCraft and Diablo computer game franchises. Tom Anderson (MA 2000) is a co-founder of the social networking website Myspace. Computer scientist Vint Cerf (1970, 1972) is vice president and Chief Internet Evangelist at Google, and the person most widely considered the "father of the Internet". Henry Samueli (1975) is co-founder of Broadcom Corporation and owner of the Anaheim Ducks. Susan Wojcicki (MBA 1998) is the former CEO of YouTube. Travis Kalanick is one of the founders of Uber. Guy Kawasaki (MBA 1979) is one of the earliest employees at Apple. Nathan Myhrvold is the founder of Microsoft Research. Bill Gross (MBA 1971) co-founded Pacific Investment Management (PIMCO). Laurence Fink (BA 1974, MBA 1976) is chairman and CEO of the world's largest money-management firm, BlackRock. Donald Prell (BA 1948) is a venture capitalist and founder of Datamation computer magazine. Ben Horowitz (MS 1990) is a co-founder of the Silicon Valley venture capital firm Andreessen Horowitz.

UCLA alumni have also achieved prominence in the arts and entertainment. John Williams is laureate conductor at the Boston Pops Orchestra and Academy Award-winning composer of the Star Wars film score. Martin Sherwin ('71) was awarded the Pulitzer Prize for American Prometheus: The Triumph and Tragedy of J. Robert Oppenheimer. Actors Ben Stiller, Jack Black, Tim Robbins, James Franco, George Takei, Mayim Bialik, Sean Astin, Holland Roden, Danielle Panabaker, and Milo Ventimiglia are also UCLA alumni. Popular music artists Sara Bareilles, the Doors, Linkin Park, and Maroon 5 all attended UCLA. Ryan Dusick of Maroon 5 majored in English. Giada De Laurentiis is a program host at Food Network and former chef at Spago. Greg Graffin, lead singer of punk rock band Bad Religion, earned a master's degree in geology at UCLA and used to teach a course on evolution there. Carol Burnett was the winner of the Mark Twain Prize for American Humor in 2013 (also winner of Emmys, a Peabody and a Presidential Medal of Freedom in 2005). Francis Ford Coppola (1967) was the director of the gangster film trilogy The Godfather, The Outsiders starring Tom Cruise, and the Vietnam War film Apocalypse Now. Dustin Lance Black is the Academy Award-winning screenwriter of the film Milk.

Meb Keflezighi (1998) was the winner of the 2014 Boston Marathon and the 2004 Olympic silver medalist in the marathon. The UCLA men's basketball team has produced Basketball Hall of Fame players such as Bill Walton and Kareem Abdul-Jabbar, as well as current NBA players Kevin Love and Russell Westbrook. Noted Bruins baseball players include Jackie Robinson, Troy Glaus, Chase Utley, Brandon Crawford, Gerrit Cole, and Trevor Bauer. Los Angeles Dodgers manager Dave Roberts won World Series titles as a member of the 2004 Boston Red Sox and in 2020, 2024, and 2025 as manager of the Dodgers.

Alumni in the military include Carlton Skinner, a U.S. Coast Guard commander who racially integrated that service at the end of World War II on the Sea Cloud. He was also the first civilian governor of Guam. Francis B. Wai is the only Chinese-American and the first Asian-American to be awarded the Congressional Medal of Honor for his actions in World War II.

As of August 1, 2016, the top three places where UCLA alumni work were Kaiser Permanente with 1,459+ alumni, UCLA Health, with 1,127+ alumni, and Google, with 1,058+ alumni.

== See also ==
- 2019 college admissions bribery scandal
- Daily Bruin – UCLA student newspaper
- UCLA Broad Stem Cell Research Center
- List of astronauts educated at the University of California
