= Jophielle Love =

Franco-American actress

- Born: May 20, 2014 (age 12); France
- Occupation: Actress
- Years active: 2019–present

Jophielle Love (born May 20, 2014) is a French-American actress. She is best known for playing Violet Finn in the soap opera General Hospital and Cooper Ormewood in the police procedural series Will Trent.

== Early life ==
Love was born in France to French stuntwoman Karine Mauffrey and American high-wire walker Jade Kindar-Martin. Her two older brothers Raphael Luce and Gabriel Sky are also actors.

== Career ==
Her first big role came playing Violet Finn in the soap opera General Hospital. On the show she sang a song called Shrine to her family at Christmas which led to her being nominated for the Emmy Award for Best Original Song at just nine years old. She had a small role in the horror film Five Nights at Freddy's. She has also had a recurring role in the police procedural series Will Trent.

== Personal life ==
In her spare time she lives in both Mas Pinet, an artist retreat in Southern France and Los Angeles, where she and her family live in a bus they use to travel the country. In November 2025, Love was a victim of a death hoax. Her family came out confirming the rumours are false and that "Jophielle is fine!".

== Filmography ==
=== Film ===
Year	Title	Role	Notes
2019	Rose	Rose	Short
2020	Ping Pong Fun	Ping Pong Racket	Video
2023	We Have a Ghost	Blonde Little Girl	
2023	Renfield	Birthday Girl	
2023	Quiz Lady	Young Daughter #1	
2023	Five Nights at Freddy's	Ghost Kid	
2025	Run Wild	Rayla	Short

=== Television ===
Year	Title	Role	Notes
2019	Grey's Anatomy	Clervie Martin	Episode; It's Raining Men
2022	FBI: International	Zoey Greer	Episode; Copper Pots and Daggers
2022	The Winchesters	5 year old Mary	Episode; Legend of a Mind
2023	Love & Death	Young Candy	2 episodes
2019-2024	General Hospital	Violet Finn	120 episodes
2023-2025	Will Trent	Cooper	10 episodes
