= Christina Wren =

American actress

- Occupation: Actress
- Years active: 2009–present

Christina Wren is an American actress. She is best known for playing Caroline in the police procedural series Will Trent and voicing Essi Daven in the animated film The Witcher: Sirens of the Deep.

== Career ==
One of her first big roles was playing J.P. Cutler in the thriller series L.A. Macabre. She became known worldwide for playing Major Carrie Farris in the superhero film Man of Steel. She reprised her role in Batman v Superman: Dawn of Justice. She played Caroline in the police procedural series Will Trent. She gained more popularity for voicing Essi Daven in the animated film The Witcher: Sirens of the Deep.

== Personal life ==
She is married to director Demetrius Wren. Together they started their own production company Two Kids with a Camera.

== Filmography ==
=== Film ===
| Year | Title | Role | Notes |
|---|---|---|---|
| 2009 | Retreat | Wife Couple#2 | Short |
| 2010 | Ships Wrecked Cove | Cathy | Short |
| 2010 | Wrong Turn | Marie Hayes | Short |
| 2010 | Coffeeshop Philosophers | Brenda | Short |
| 2011 | Bandit | The Bandit | Short |
| 2012 | Static Shock Blackout | Frieda Goren | Short |
| 2012 | Saudade? | Sophia | |
| 2013 | Allo | Lucy | Short |
| 2013 | Man of Steel | Major Carrie Farris | |
| 2014 | SPF | Woman | Short |
| 2014 | Moon and Sun | Lori | |
| 2015 | Discount Fitness | Lisa | Short |
| 2016 | Batman v Superman: Dawn of Justice | Major Farris | |
| 2017 | Surface of the Last Scattering | Dr Emmons | Short |
| 2018 | Eruption: LA | Simon | |
| 2018 | Rehabilitation of the Hill | Kelly Saikaly | |
| 2020 | The Real Founding Fathers of America | James Madison | |
| 2020 | Lazaretto | Euphelia | Short |
| 2020 | Vigilant | Maddie | |
| 2021 | Lazarus | Priscilla | |
| 2022 | The Clog | Ellen Bannister | |
| 2023 | The Passport | Amy | |
| 2024 | 172 Push-Ups | Jenny | Short |
| 2024 | Escape | Ember | Short |
| 2025 | The Witcher: Sirens of the Deep | Essi Daven | |

=== Television ===
| Year | Title | Role | Notes |
|---|---|---|---|
| 2014 | America: A Love Song | Clementine, Jackie | 5 episodes |
| 2014 | Sequestered | Grace Miller | 4 episodes |
| 2014 | Ingress Obsessed | Wrenegade | 7 episodes |
| 2014 | Half Sisters | Vanessa Stone | 8 episodes |
| 2015 | Lusa | Lusa | 6 episodes |
| 2015 | Discount Fitness | Lisa | Episode; Goal Met |
| 2018 | Coach Hop Playlist | Shannon Leeman | Episode; I Love You Goodbye |
| 2019–2020 | Hicksters | Ruby Hadid-Robinson | 6 episodes |
| 2024 | L.A. Macabre | J. P. Cutler | 15 episodes |
| 2024–2025 | Cross | Kat Myers | Episode; You Had Me at Motherfucker |
| 2024 | Will Trent | Caroline | 12 episodes |
