= The Witcher: Sirens of the Deep =

2025 animated film by Kang Hei Chul

- Release poster
- Directed by: Kang Hei Chul
- Screenplay by: Mike Ostrowski; Rae Benjamin
- Based on: "A Little Sacrifice" by Andrzej Sapkowski
- Produced by: Lauren Schmidt Hissrich
- Starring: Doug Cockle; Joey Batey; Anya Chalotra; Christina Wren
- Music by: Joseph Trapanese
- Production companies: Studio Mir; Studio IAM; Platige Image; Hivemind
- Distributed by: Netflix
- Release date: February 11, 2025
- Running time: 91 minutes
- Countries: South Korea; United States; Poland
- Language: English

The Witcher: Sirens of the Deep is a 2025 adult animated fantasy drama film, serving as a spin-off of the Netflix series The Witcher. It was directed by Kang Hei Chul and written by Mike Ostrowski and Rae Benjamin. The film is a loose adaptation of the short story "A Little Sacrifice" by Andrzej Sapkowski.

== Plot ==
Geralt is hired to kill an Allamorax which is deemed responsible for the deaths of several fishermen in Bremervoord. He lets the creature go after the merman Deroua beg to have mercy on it and claim that the Allamorax is not responsible. Since Geralt forfeited the kill and the prize money, Jaskier accepts an invite to play at the local festival to earn money.

There, they meet Jaskier's childhood friend and bard Essi 'Little Eye' Daven. King Usveldt and his son prince Agloval attend as well, along with the King Usvelt's bastard son/military advisor Zelest, who used to bully Jaskier when they were young. During the festival, a boat with pearl hunters is attacked. One of the fishermen makes it to the festival and before dying, says they were attacked by Vodnik (humanoid fish creatures) on the sirens' order. King Usveldt has originally refused to take action against the merpeople because his son is in love with the siren princess Sh'eenaz. However, this attack finally begets retaliation, with King Usveldt ordering Geralt to find and hunt the ones responsible for killing the pearl divers. Also during the festivities, Agloval is introduced to a young human princess named Nispen by his father.

Meanwhile, the merpeople and seal people are calling to their king Basim and queen Dahut for action led by Dahut's sister/Sh'eenaz's aunt Melusina as the humans are taking away their food due to the excess fishing and profit of oyster pearls. Sh'eenaz manages to quell the restlessness of her people, claiming a marriage with Agloval could bring peace to both worlds.

Geralt, Jaskier and Essi investigate the attack further and find the Vodnik's lair. They confront the Vodnik assassin sent to hunt Geralt as to who hired them to attack the pearl hunters, but before they can get any information out of them, Zelest and his army arrive and kill the Vodnik, igniting a battle between Zelest's troops and the other Vodnik in the area with Deroua getting fatally wounded. Agloval and Sh'eenaz watch the battle from afar in their secret meeting spot, with Geralt, Jaskier and Essi catching up with them after Zelest retreats. Agloval wants to marry Sh'eenaz, but through an argument translated by Essi who understands the mermaid language, they argue and part ways in anger, exacerbating the war between both parties.

Because of a comment Jaskier makes and after investigating the shipwrecked pearl hunter's boat with Essi, Geralt realizes the true villain is Melusina who is revealed as a sea witch. Using shape-shifting magic, Melusina attacked the boats by transforming into a Kraken while also posing as Princess Nispen. Furthermore, King Usveldt has been collaborating with Melusina in order to convince his son that Sh'eenaz is not a worthy bride with Melusina wanting to get back at her sister after King Basim chose Dahut as his queen instead of her. Melusina flees the palace after she is exposed, but King Usveldt still intends to go on with the war and has Geralt and Jaskier arrested along with Zelest, who was unaware of the conspiracy and goes against his father.

As the merpeople prepare for the upcoming battle, Melusina secretly offers Sh'eenaz a potion to transform her into her lover's form, giving her the chance to be with Agloval as a human. Essi manages to evade capture and privately speak to Agloval, downtrodden due to his father's deception, giving him words of encouragement and persuading him to defy his father and end the war.

King Usveldt sails into the merpeople's waters to attack them, with Geralt and company in tow as hostages. Geralt, Jaskier and Zelest manage to escape and join the fight, with Melusina once again transforming into a kraken and attacking everyone, killing Zelest in the process. After saving Agloval who arrived on a smaller ship, King Usveldt wounds Sh'eenaz and she retreats into the sea as Geralt is swallowed by Melusina. Geralt escapes by cutting her open from the inside, killing Melusina with a fatal blow to the kraken's head. Agloval manages to stop the fighting and exposes the deceit from his father and what his actions have caused, while Sh'eenaz is rescued and healed by Queen Dahut. Sh'eenaz and Agloval agree to marry and bring peace to both kingdoms.

On the wedding day, a relenting King Usveldt believes Sh'eenaz will take the potion to live on land, but Agloval takes it instead, wishing to no longer be beholden to his father and his kingdom, giving up his human and royal status to be with Sh'eenaz. Transforming into a merman, Agloval disappears into the sea with his new family as Geralt tells King Usveldt that his legacy will end with him.

Essi confesses her feelings for Geralt, spending the night together. In the morning, they realize they cannot be together as Essi wants a family and quiet life and Geralt is addicted to the road, still yearning for Yennefer. They part ways amicably with Geralt and Jaskier leaving for Caingorn as Jaskier hopes that they won't run into Yennefer there.

== Cast ==
- Doug Cockle as Geralt of Rivia, a Witcher. Cockle reprises his role as Geralt from the video games developed by CD Projekt Red.
- Joey Batey as Jaskier, a human bard and Geralt's companion. Besides voicing a younger Jaskier, Batey reprises his role from the Netflix series.
- Anya Chalotra as Yennefer of Vengerberg, a quarter-elf sorceress that Geralt knows. Chalotra also reprises her role from the Netflix series.
- Christina Wren as Essi Daven, a female bard in Bremervoord who is Jaskier’s old friend
  - Valerie Roz Lohman as young Essi
- Emily Carey as Sh'eenaz, a mermaid princess
- Mallory Jansen as Melusina, a sea witch and the aunt of Sh'eenaz who poses as Princess Nispen when on land
- Camrus Johnson as Agloval, the prince of Bremervoord
- Simon Templeman as King Usveldt, the king of Bremervoord and the father of Agloval who disproves of his son's love for Sh'eenaz
- Ray Chase as Zelest, the illegitimate son of King Usveldt who works as his military advisor.
  - Greg Vinciguerra as young Zelest
- Cynthia McWilliams as Queen Dahut, the queen of the merpeople, mother of Sh'eenaz, and sister of Melusina
- Ramon Tikaram as King Basim, the king of the merpeople and the father of Sh'eenaz
- Kari Wahlgren as:
  - Zmarra, a mermaid who is Sh'eenaz's cousin
  - A vodnik assassin sent by Melusina to attack Geralt
- Stephen Fu as Deroua, a merman who is Zmarra's husband
- Gregory Ackles as Teleri Drouhard, a spice merchant and guildmaster in Bremervoord
- Brian George as:
  - Barkeep
  - King Usveldt's herald
- Maury Sterling as Berat, a crew member on a pearl-hunting boat
- Darin De Paul as the captain of a pearl-hunting boat
- Brittany Ishibashi as:
  - Essi's sister
  - A seal woman
- Ry Chase as Lachlan, Essi's younger brother who is recruited into the war against the merpeople

== Production ==
In September 2021 at "Tudum: A Netflix Global Fan Event", Netflix first announced development of a second anime feature film following The Witcher: Nightmare of the Wolf. In the following months, executive producer Tomek Baginski stated that the film would be directly based on a work by Andrzej Sapkowski in The Witcher series as opposed to creating a new story from material Sapkowski hints at throughout the series. This was later revealed to be the short story "A Little Sacrifice" from Sword of Destiny when Netflix also revealed the title The Witcher: Sirens of the Deep in a teaser trailer. Netflix collaborated with South Korean animation Studio Mir, Studio IAM and Platige Image and Hivemind, as they had with Nightmare of the Wolf. The announcement also included a 2024 release and the cast. After Henry Cavill left the series, Doug Cockle returned to voice Geralt of Rivia as he had in the video game series. Joey Batey and Anya Chalotra would reprise their roles from the live-action series, and Christina Wren joined the cast. The film was delayed and eventually released on February 11, 2025.

== Reception ==
On the review aggregator website Rotten Tomatoes, 58% of 19 critics' reviews are positive, with an average rating of 5.6/10. Metacritic, which uses a weighted average, assigned the film a score of 54 out of 100, based on 8 critics, indicating "mixed or average" reviews.
