= American Soul =

American television series

- Genre: Drama; Thriller
- Created by: Jonathan Prince; Devon Greggory
- Starring: Sinqua Walls; Jason Dirden; Iantha Richardson; Christopher Jefferson; Katlyn Nichol; Jelani Winston; Kelly Price; India McGee; Perri L. Camper; Christopher B. Duncan
- Composer: Kurt Farquhar
- Country of origin: United States
- Original language: English
- No. of seasons: 2
- No. of episodes: 18

Production
- Executive producers: Tony Cornelius; Peter O'Fallon; Jonathan Prince; Devon Greggory; Alfonso Delgado; Kenneth Edmonds (season 2)
- Producers: James Bigwood; Carl Craig
- Production locations: Atlanta, Georgia; Los Angeles
- Cinematography: Richard Vialet
- Editors: Jacques Gravett; Jamin Bricker
- Camera setup: Single-camera
- Running time: 39–42 minutes
- Production companies: Once A Frog Entertainment; Inphiniti Entertainment; Philoment Media; Jesse Collins Entertainment

Original release
- Network: BET
- Release: February 5, 2019 – July 15, 2020

American Soul is an American musical drama television series, created by Jonathan Prince and Devon Greggory, that premiered on February 5, 2019, on BET. The series tells the story of Don Cornelius and the creation of his legendary music and dance program Soul Train and it stars an ensemble cast including Sinqua Walls, Jason Dirden, Iantha Richardson, Christopher Jefferson, Katlyn Nichol, Jelani Winston, and Kelly Price. In April 2019, it was renewed for a second season, which premiered on May 27, 2020.

Cast member Katlyn Nichol revealed in an interview on the ENSPIRE Network podcast, in 2021, that there would not be a third season of the series.

== Premise ==
American Soul tells the story of Don Cornelius, "his Soul Train dancers, crew and musicians in a cutthroat Hollywood in the 1970s and how they worked, played, rose and fell against the backdrop of the show that was most responsible for the way African-American culture was perceived by the world then."

The first season takes place between the first two seasons of Soul Train between 1971 and 1973. The second season jumps ahead two years later in 1975.

== Cast and characters ==
=== Main ===
- Sinqua Walls as Don Cornelius
- Jason Dirden as Gerald Aims
- Jelani Winston as Kendall Clarke (season 1)
- Christopher Jefferson as Jeffrey "JT" Tucker
- Iantha Richardson as Tessa Lorraine
- Kelly Price as Brianne Clarke
- Katlyn Nichol as Simone Clarke
- India McGee as Flo, a dancer on Soul Train
- Perri L. Camper as Delores Cornelius, Don's first wife

=== Recurring ===
- Kelly Rowland as Gladys Knight (season 1)
- Shannon Kane as Ilsa Dejarnette, a vindictive lawyer for Motown
- Javon Johnson as George Johnson, founder of Afro and Ultra Sheen and a close friend of Don's (season 1, guest season 2)
- Jared Warren as Johnnie Cochran
- Phillip Mullings Jr. as Patrick Lorriane, a LAPD detective and husband of Tessa (season 1)
- Simeon Daise as Reggie Michaels, revolutionary gangster
- Joseph Lee Anderson as Joseph Clarke, a Vietnam veteran, husband of Brianne, and father of Simone and Kendall, who is killed while on a tour of duty in Vietnam
- James Devoti as Brooks Donald, a slightly bigoted business partner of Don's
- Shannon Wallace as Private Nate Barker (season 1)
- Njema Williams as Uncle Pete (season 1)
- Christopher B. Duncan as Ray Bradley (season 2)
- Candace West as TBA, girlfriend of JT, rival of Simone Clarke (season 2)
- Kearran Giovanni as Ruby Daniels, an acquaintance of Don and ex-wife of Gerald. (season 2)
- Michael Christopher Rodney as Woody Harley, ex-lover of Simone Clarke, rival of JT (season 2)

=== Guest ===
==== Season 1 ====
- Michelle Williams as Diana Ross
- Bobby Brown as Rufus Thomas
- Gabrielle Dennis as Tina Turner
- McKinley Freeman as Ike Turner
- K. Michelle as Martha Reeves
- Wayne Brady as Little Richard

==== Season 2 ====
- Darius McCrary as James Brown
- Ledisi as Patti LaBelle
- Big Boi as George Clinton
- Tone Bell as Richard Pryor
- Melanie Fiona as Chaka Khan
- Demetria McKinney as June Pointer
- Yung Joc as Garry Shider
- London Brown as Bootsy Collins
- D.C. Young Fly as Sly Stone
- Hudson Thames as Elton John
- Alex Ball as Dick Clark

== Episodes ==
Season	Episodes	Originally released	
Season	Episodes	First released	Last released
1	10	February 5, 2019	April 2, 2019
2	8	May 27, 2020	July 15, 2020

=== Season 1 (2019) ===
No. overall	No. in season	Title	Directed by	Written by	Original release date	U.S. viewers (millions)
1	1	"Man is First Destiny"	Peter O'Fallon	Story by : Jonathan Prince & Devon Greggory; Teleplay by : Devon Greggory	February 5, 2019	0.89
2	2	"Continuous Revolution In Progress"	Peter O'Fallon	Devon Greggory & Katlyn Nichol	February 5, 2019	0.99
3	3	"Lost and Found"	Robert Townsend	Annmarie Morais	February 12, 2019	0.68
4	4	"Just Us"	Robert Townsend	A. Zell Williams	February 19, 2019	0.55
5	5	"Fault Lines"	Peter O'Fallon	Nathan Alan Davis	February 26, 2019	0.44
6	6	"What Are You Looking At?"	Peter O'Fallon	Zach Ayers	March 5, 2019	0.57
7	7	"Nothing To Fear"	Chris Robinson	Sara Finney-Johnson	March 12, 2019	0.45
8	8	"Nothing Ventured…Nothing Gained"	Angela Barnes Gomes	Annmarie Morais	March 19, 2019	0.37
9	9	"68 B.C."	Angela Barnes Gomes	Zach Ayers & Devon Greggory	March 26, 2019	0.41
10	10	"Proceed With Caution"	Chris Robinson	Annmarie Morais	April 2, 2019	0.50

=== Season 2 (2020) ===
No. overall	No. in season	Title	Directed by	Written by	Original release date	U.S. viewers (millions)
11	1	"1975"	Thomas Carter	Judy McCreary	May 27, 2020	0.74
12	2	"Fame"	Thomas Carter	Zach Ayers	June 3, 2020	0.56
13	3	"Satisfaction"	John Scott	Yvette Foy	June 10, 2020	0.64
14	4	"Lovely Day"	John Scott	Norman Vance Jr.	June 17, 2020	0.67
15	5	"Say You Love Me"	Crystle Roberson	Norman Vance Jr.	June 24, 2020	0.61
16	6	"Low Rider"	Crystle Roberson	Yvette Foy	July 1, 2020	0.53
17	7	"Love Will Keep Us Together"	Jono Oliver	Zach Ayers	July 8, 2020	0.60
18	8	"So Long, Sucker"	Jono Oliver	Judy McCreary	July 15, 2020	0.62

== Production ==
=== Development ===
On April 10, 2018, it was announced that BET had given a series order to the production for a first season consisting of ten episodes. Executive producers are set to include Jesse Collins, Jonathan Prince and Devon Greggory. Tony Cornelius will co-executive produce alongside Andy Horne. Greggory will write the pilot episode and Jesse Collins Entertainment will produce. On September 4, 2018, it was confirmed that Greggory and Prince had created the series and that Prince would also co-write the pilot episode. On November 25, 2018, it was announced that the series would premiere on February 5, 2019. On April 2, 2019, it was announced that the series was renewed for a second season, which premiered on May 27, 2020.

=== Casting ===
In September 2018, it was announced that Sinqua Walls, Jason Dirden, Iantha Richardson, Christopher Jefferson, Katlyn Nichol, Jelani Winston, and Kelly Price had been cast in series regular roles and that Kelly Rowland would appear in a recurring capacity. On October 12, 2018, it was reported that Shannon Kane and Perri Camper had been cast in recurring roles. On December 21, 2018, it was announced that Michelle Williams, Bobby Brown, Gabrielle Dennis, McKinley Freeman, and K. Michelle would make guest appearances.

=== Filming ===
Principal photography for the series commenced in Atlanta, Georgia on September 17, 2018 and was scheduled to last until December 2018. In September 2018, filming for the series transpired at Pullman Yard on September 17, in Downtown Atlanta on September 18, at the Atlanta Motor Speedway on September 19, and at Armour Yard on September 20. In October 2018, filming continued in Atlanta with shooting taking place at Pullman Yard on October 7 and at the Bitsy Grant Tennis Center in Buckhead on October 27. In November 2018, filming occurred in Sandy Springs, Georgia, on November 9 with shooting place at a Robert Green designed private home and in Downtown Atlanta on November 27. In December 2018, the production was working out of Palmetto on December 10 and 11.

== Release ==
=== Marketing ===
On November 25, 2018, a teaser trailer for the series premiered during the 31st Soul Train Awards.

=== Premiere ===
On January 29, 2019, the series held its New York premiere at the New World Stage in New York City. Those in attendance included BET Networks President Scott Mills, executive producer Tony Cornelius, and actors Sinqua Walls, Kelly Price, Jason Dirden, Naturi Naughton, Jelani Winston, Katlyn Nichol, Shannon Wallace, Christopher Jefferson, and Iantha Richardson.

On February 4, 2019, the series held its Los Angeles premiere at the Wolf Theatre in Los Angeles, California. Those in attendance included Sinqua Walls, Jason Dirden, Tami Roman, McKinley Freeman, Tank, Robert Townsend, Vanessa Bell Calloway, Tommy Davidson, Darrin Dewitt Henson, Tony Cornelius, Christina Cornelius, Scott Mills, Leon Robinson, Kenny Burns, Jesse Collins, Christopher Jefferson, Candace West, Katlyn Nichol, Iantha Richardson and India McGee.

== Reception ==
The series has been met with a positive response from critics upon its premiere. Metacritic, which uses a weighted average, assigned the series a score of 70 out of 100 based on 4 critics, indicating "generally favorable reviews".

The series was submitted by BET for fourteen categories at the 71st Primetime Emmy Awards, but none were selected. Kelly Rowland won the NAACP Image Awards Outstanding Guest Performance in a Comedy or Drama Series for her role.
