= Will Trent =

2023 American police procedural crime drama television series

- Genre: Police procedural; Crime drama
- Based on: Will Trent book series by Karin Slaughter
- Developed by: Liz Heldens & Daniel Thomsen
- Starring: Ramón Rodríguez; Erika Christensen; Iantha Richardson; Jake McLaughlin; Sonja Sohn; Gina Rodriguez; Kevin Daniels; Alexandra Metz
- Music by: Joe Wong
- Country of origin: United States
- Original language: English
- No. of seasons: 4
- No. of episodes: 59

Production
- Executive producers: Liz Heldens; Paul McGuigan; Oliver Obst; Karin Slaughter; Ramon Rodriguez
- Producers: Ellen Marie Blum; David Blake Hartley
- Running time: 43–44 minutes
- Production companies: Selfish Mermaid; 3 Arts Entertainment (season 4-present); Salt City Heavy Industries; 20th Television

Original release
- Network: ABC
- Release: January 3, 2023 – present

Will Trent is an American police procedural television series developed by Liz Heldens and Daniel T. Thomsen based on the series of novels by Karin Slaughter. The series, starring Ramón Rodríguez in the titular role, premiered on January 3, 2023, on ABC. In April 2026, the series was renewed for a fifth season, which is set to premiere on January 5, 2027.

== Premise ==
Abandoned as a child, Will Trent grew up in the Atlanta foster care system. This had a lasting effect on him and, despite being dyslexic, he became a Special Agent in the Georgia Bureau of Investigation (GBI). Will is highly observant, solving the highest proportion of cases in the GBI, which causes some envy.

Will had been assigned a corruption case involving the Atlanta Police Department (APD), which shares an office building with the GBI. Solving it resulted in the arrest of several APD officers. Amanda Wagner, his boss at the GBI, assigns Faith Mitchell, the disgruntled daughter of an arrested APD officer, temporary GBI status as Will's partner.

He is in an on-again off-again relationship with APD Detective Angie Polaski, his childhood friend from the foster care system. Angie is partnered with APD Detective Michael Ormewood. Will and Angie's cases sometimes overlap, bringing the two and their partners into ongoing contact.

== Cast ==
=== Main ===
- Ramón Rodríguez as Wilbur "Will" Trent, GBI Special Agent
- Erika Christensen as Angela "Angie" Polaski, APD Homicide Detective
- Iantha Richardson as Faith Mitchell, GBI Special Agent
- Jake McLaughlin as Michael Ormewood, APD Homicide Detective
- Sonja Sohn as Amanda Wagner (seasons 1–4), GBI Deputy Director, former APD Officer
- Bluebell as Betty Maria White Trent, a chihuahua Will adopts in the pilot episode.
- Gina Rodriguez as Marion Alba (season 3), Assistant District Attorney
- Kevin Daniels as Franklin Wilks (season 4–present; recurring seasons 1–3), APD Homicide Detective
- Alexandra Metz as Birdie Palmer (season 5), GBI Deputy Director and Amanda's successor

=== Recurring ===
- Mark-Paul Gosselaar as Paul Campano, a car dealership owner who grew up in the same orphanage as Will and Angela
- Greg Germann as James Ulster, a serial killer who had a sexual relationship with Will's mother
- LisaGay Hamilton as Evelyn Mitchell, Faith's mother and a retired APD captain. She was formerly partners with Amanda when they were APD officers.
- Cora Lu Tran as Nico, a non-binary former murder suspect who pet-sits Betty for Will
- John Ortiz as Antonio Morales, Will's maternal uncle
- Christina Wren as Caroline, Amanda's executive assistant
- Ser'Darius Blain as Luke Sullivan (season 2), a journalist who was in relationship with Faith
- Sara Antonio as Gina Ormewood (seasons 1–2), Michael's ex-wife
- Jophielle Love as Cooper Ormewood, Michael's daughter
- Owen Trumbly as Max Ormewood, Michael's son
- Deion Smith as Jeremy Mitchell, Faith's son and Evelyn's grandson
- Chapel Oaks as Crystal (seasons 1–2), a teenage rape victim who Angela connects with
- Todd Allen Durkin as Captain Heller, APD captain who Angela, Michael, and Franklin report to
- Raiany Silva as Lucy Morales, Will's biological mother and a street prostitute
- Kurt Yue as Pete Chin, the medical examiner for the GBI and APD
- Scott Foley as Dr. Seth McDale (seasons 3–4), Angela's late husband and the father of her daughter Edie
- Kyrie McAlpin as Sunny (season 3), teenage daughter of Rafael who is fostered by Amanda
- Antwayn Hopper as Rafael Wexford (season 3), a gang leader who is Will's childhood friend and Sunny's father
- Yul Vazquez as Sheriff Caleb Roussard, Will's biological father

=== Guests ===
- Ric Reitz as Director Armstrong (season 1), GBI state-wide director
- Ariana Madix as herself
- C. Thomas Howell as Warden Sturgill Hawley
- Clark Gregg as Arthur Highsmith
- French Stewart as Leonard "Lenny" Broussard, Angela's former foster father
- Jason Wiles as Officer Tate Grillo
- Jenna Elfman as Edie Reynolds
- Jennifer Morrison as Abigail Bentley Campano
- Jennifer Westfeldt as Erin Carrey
- Jose Pablo Cantillo as Gabriel
- Julia Chan as Ava Green, a photographer who has a "situationship" with Will
- Kathleen York as Babs Carter
- Mallory Jansen as Adelaide Trevens, James Ulster's daughter
- Margaret Cho as Dr. Roach, Will's therapist
- Michael Fairman as Dale Merrick
- Michael Papajohn as Chuck Murray
- Phaedra Parks as Adela Blakely
- Ricardo Chavira as Councilman Victor Carrey
- Rotimi as Charles
- Roxanne Hart as Kathleen Marigold
- Shalim Ortiz as Dante Vasquez
- Susan Kelechi Watson as Cricket Dawson
- Sydney Park as Young Amanda Wagner
- Yvette Freeman as Bonnie
- Kurt Yaeger as Rudy Fritchman
- Douglas Smith as Special Agent Gross (season 3)

== Episodes ==
=== Series overview ===
Season	Episodes	Originally released		Rank	Avg. viewership (in millions)
Season	Episodes	First released	Last released	Rank	Avg. viewership (in millions)
1	13	January 3, 2023	May 2, 2023	33	5.99
2	10	February 20, 2024	May 21, 2024	23	6.64
3	18	January 7, 2025	May 13, 2025	7	10.90
4	18	January 6, 2026	May 5, 2026	8	10.20

=== Season 1 (2023) ===
No. overall	No. in season	Title	Directed by	Written by	Original release date	Prod. code	U.S. viewers (millions)
1	1	"Pilot"	Paul McGuigan	Liz Heldens & Daniel Thomsen	January 3, 2023	1LGF01	3.61
High school student Emma Campano is apparently murdered in her own home during a botched burglary. Arriving home shortly afterwards, Emma's mother Abigail confronts and kills the apparent murderer. The Georgia Bureau of Investigation (GBI) is ordered to investigate alongside the police. GBI Deputy Director Amanda Wagner assigns her best investigator, Special Agent Will Trent. Will is unpopular with the Atlanta PD due to his role in a recent police corruption investigation, which ended many APD careers. Will's car has been vandalized but he stops off to adopt Betty, a chihuahua owned by his recently deceased neighbor. In addition, Emma's father Paul Campano knows Will from their time in an orphanage as children, where Paul bullied Will severely. Nevertheless, Will's superior observation and reasoning soon establish the dead girl is not Emma Campano but her friend, Kayla; Emma has been kidnapped using her own car, and the boy killed by Abigail is innocent. Amanda partners Will with reluctant APD Detective Faith Mitchell, whose mother's police career was ended by Will's investigation. APD Detective Michael Ormewood leads Emma's kidnapping investigation. Will finds Emma's abandoned car thanks to a tip from his friend, undercover narcotics Detective Angie Polaski. CCTV from a recording studio near the car confirms Emma's kidnapping but those responsible can't be identified. Suspicion falls on recording studio worker Warren, who had an obsession with Emma but when Will and Faith arrive at the studio to question him, Warren fatally shoots himself. Will returns home to find Angie waiting for him, and they become intimate. Next morning Paul Campano arrives at Will's house, saying he has shot Emma's kidnapper.
2	2	"I'm a Pretty Observant Guy"	Howard Deutch	Liz Heldens	January 10, 2023	1LGF02	2.95
Paul is surprised to find Angie at Will's house and it transpires Angie also grew up in foster homes with Will and Paul. Regarding the shooting, Paul suspected Emma's high school English teacher of sexually abusing her, went to the man's house and shot him 'accidentally'. He further justifies that, given their collective childhoods, they should recognize a predator. Will asks Paul for a DNA sample to eliminate him as a suspect, leading to a fight between them. Will's further investigations duly raise suspicions about the wounded teacher, Evan Bernard, who soon reveals himself as a sexual predator and cunning sociopath and taunts Will when he recognizes Will is dyslexic. Meanwhile Angie, questioned by her colleagues, admits to an 'on-off' relationship with Will for several years. Angie also has a history of alcohol and substance abuse and her sponsor, Det. Franklin, is concerned Angie's relationship with Will is potentially unhealthy. Angie has transferred to homicide and partnered with Ormewood, apprehensively as they had a brief past affair. Angie and Ormewood quickly solve their first case thanks to young witness Nico, who is non-binary. Angie recruits Nico to take care of Will's new dog Betty while he's at work. Will realizes the high school guidance counsellor, Mary Clark, is involved in Emma's kidnapping. Mary almost kills Will when he goes alone to interview her but he is saved by Faith. Mary has also been sexually abused and manipulated by Evan and refuses to co-operate. Will asks Angie to share a horrifying story from her own childhood with Mary, at which point Mary breaks down and gives the GBI detectives Emma's location. Emma is saved and Evan arrested and charged. Will asks Angie over for dinner but she refuses, upset over her personal trauma being used to break the case.
3	3	"Don't Let It Happen Again"	Howard Deutch	Inda Craig-Galván	January 17, 2023	1LGF04	3.32
Will and Faith are assigned a murder case in the Lake Lanier area. The Oakmead County mayor's body was found in his burnt-out boat. Faith, driving with Will, argues with her son on the phone and eats junk food. Will soon connects the mayor's death with another recent murder and eventually, a 30-year-old cold case involving a black family found murdered in their station wagon near the lake. Will, Faith and Hall County Sheriff Josie Miller are joined by Amanda, saying the station wagon murders weren't properly investigated and blaming the sheriff at the time. They find an old photo of four men linked to the murders. Josie recognizes two of the men as the recent murder victims. A local mechanic is soon identified as another in the photo. Carrying a shotgun, he refuses to surrender and Josie shoots and kills him, shocking Amanda. The fourth man is eventually identified as David Merrick, son of the sheriff at the time of the murders. Exploring the old station wagon, Will realizes there was a baby in the car, overlooked by the assailants and later taken by sheriff John Merrick. Josie Miller was that baby and is now exacting revenge on her family's killers. Josie pulls her gun on Faith and demands they confront David Merrick. On Lake Lanier bridge, David confesses to the murders. Josie shoots him in the leg as Faith tries to talk her down. Will and Amanda arrive, Amanda promising to shoot Josie if she harms Faith. Josie throws herself into the lake and drowns. Faith reflects on the history of Lake Lanier, its creation involving destruction of a black community and ghosts haunting the area. In Atlanta, after solving their latest case Ormewood invites Angie to dinner at his family's home. Ormewood's wife Gina tells Angie she is aware of her husband and Angie's past sexual encounter and demands Angie prevent another. Angie later informs Will of her brief affair with Ormewood, explaining she doesn't want secrets between them.
4	4	"My Stupid Detective Brain"	Sheree Folkson	Kath Lingenfelter	January 24, 2023	1LGF05	3.04
Will is at the hospital with Faith, who collapsed at work and is being examined. Amanda calls and informs Will the GBI have been asked to look at a man hit by a pickup in Stone Mountain Park. Will is assisted by Angie and Ormewood, with Ormewood angry at being deputized to Will again. The subject of the case is badly injured and soon expires, his body bears signs of restraint and torture, and he has also been chemically blinded. Investigating the park, the team discover a second body with similar injuries. Ormewood falls into a hidden underground bunker, injuring his ankle. The bunker, a torture chamber from which the dead men escaped, contains items from a local church. Will connects the dead men to a poster in the church foyer, advertising a support group for separated, failed fathers. Will carries protein bars to satisfy Faith's food cravings, realizing she has diabetes. Faith has deduced Will's dyslexia, and they discuss the ways personal issues are used to disparage professional ability. Will is also obsessing over Angie and Ormewood's past relationship, preventing him focusing on a key piece of evidence, an audio recording of the initial accident made by two podcasters. Ormewood is frustrated when assigned routine follow-up interviews but he soon identifies a suspect, Tom Coldfield. Ormewood travels to Coldfield's address, an old farm, but Coldfield surprises and imprisons him. From the recording, Will finally realizes the initial victim was deliberately run down by the truck. Interviewing the older couple from the truck, he discovers Coldfield is the woman's son and his biological father was a broke, abusive alcoholic. Coldfield's mother and stepfather were aiding their son's revenge mission against all such fathers. Will, Faith and Angie arrive at the farm in time to rescue Ormewood and arrest Coldfield. Later, lying in bed next to Angie, Will ponders their future.
5	5	"The Look Out"	Charles Randolph-Wright	Daniel Thomsen	January 31, 2023	1LGF03	3.22
When Betty goes missing briefly, Will blames Angie and they have a heated argument, after which Angie decides to move out. Faith is called to a club where there has been a shooting incident with her son present. Will tags along and, as Faith disciplines her son, Will argues with the cops about the incident. A retired football star, Chris Conlan, had his gold chains snatched, his wife attacked the robber and was shot. Will bets the APD cops he can solve the crime that night. Using some photos from a club website, Will quickly tracks down a stickup gang but a lack of evidence absolves them of the crimes under investigation. The website photographer, Ava, and Will flirt and later she asks him out but Will declines, feeling guilty over the apparent end of his latest relationship with Angie. Will soon establishes Conlan's college team-mate 'Pudge' committed the robbery as part of an insurance scam; the stolen jewellery was fake but Pudge was supposed to be carrying an unloaded gun. Pudge's body plummets from a balcony into a parked car as Will and Faith arrive to interview him. The cops demand their money, Will bets double-or-nothing. From Ava's photos of other club nights Will establishes Conlan's manager and wife were having an affair. Aware of the fake robbery, the manager had loaded the gun hoping Conlan would be killed. As Conlan attempts to shoot his manager, Will and Faith arrive to arrest both. Angie and Ormewood investigate the murder of a realtor who dealt in cryptocurrency. They track the money to the realtor's former partner in a pornography business. The man runs when they try to arrest him. Ormewood chases down and beats him, concerning Angie. Angie also discovers a victim of sex trafficking in the house and promises to take care of her. Later, Angie returns to Will's, saying she doesn't want to abandon relationships when they become difficult.
6	6	"Should I Go Get My Tin Foil Hat?"	Lea Thompson	Britta Lundin	February 14, 2023	1LGF06	2.89
Faith and her son Jeremy find Faith's ex-partner (and Jeremy's father) Charles in their house. Charles maintains he's being followed and begs Faith's help. She solicits Will's assistance. Will finds evidence of intruders using Charles's apartment to spy on his neighbors, Kevin and Sally, whom the GBI agents discover murdered. Sally worked for IT company Selantus, responsible for supplying the GBI's phones, computers and IT. Soon Will is being followed and Faith subjected to threatening messages, upsetting Charles who is an Afghanistan veteran suffering PTSD. Will links a clue left by Sally at her murder scene to a newspaper reporter. Meeting with Will and Faith, the reporter tells them Selantus installed a backdoor into the GBI's IT systems and are stealing information regarding GBI investigations. Sally stole a hard drive with evidence of the backdoor and gave the reporter a key to its location. As the reporter leaves she is killed in a drive-by shooting. Will and Faith become paranoid about IT security at the GBI, frustrating Amanda. Charles recognizes the key, recovered by Will, as belonging to Sally's post office box and texts Faith the location, thus alerting Selantus too. In a shootout at the post office, the murderous Selantus employee is captured but not before he obtains and destroys the hard drive. Despite lacking this evidence, Will, Faith and Amanda convince GBI Director Armstrong to sever the GBI's relationship with Selantus. Faith notes positive bonding between Charles and Jeremy and suggests Charles be involved in future parenting. The trafficked girl rescued by Angie expresses concern for her underage friend Jade. Angie and Ormewood rescue Jade from a pornographer, entering the premises under a flimsy pretext. Will notices his dog-sitter Nico behaving oddly and stealing money from him. Nico later admits to being beaten and extorted by another resident in their block, so Will invites Nico to move in with him and Betty.
7	7	"Unable to Locate"	Patricia Cardoso	Henry "Hank" Jones	February 21, 2023	1LGF07	2.63
Will discovers Betty chewing the discarded instructions for a pregnancy test. When Will asks Angie about it, she explains she didn't take the test due to apprehension about becoming a mother, mentioning her history and the fact she is "only 62 days sober". Will's attempts at reassurance only increase Angie's anxiety who lies "the baby might not be yours", angering Will. Throughout the episode, Will recalls an earlier time when he and Angie were teenage runaways from a foster home, seeking an abortion after Angie was raped and made pregnant by the male custodian. In the present day, Will and Faith are asked to find a stolen shipping container of guns. The Confederate Front (CF), a right-wing extremist group, are the prime suspects. Will confronts a suspect outside a bar but is attacked by CF members. Injured, he hides in the back of a pickup owned by a CF member and loses consciousness. Faith reports Will missing and Amanda initiates a massive search, while Angie feels guilt. Will awakes in the back of the now-moving truck, his phone powerless. They eventually arrive at a site and Will decides to take on the CF alone but first leaves an emotional 'final' message for Angie on his tape-recorder. Faith's aggressive investigating enables the GBI to suddenly arrive in force, arrest the CF members and save Will. Angie and Ormewood investigate a murder at a fashion sneaker launch; the store owner Lou Lou claims to have witnessed the murder and know the shooter, a rival sneaker trader. Angie is suspicious of Ormewood and Lou Lou's familiarity and neatly closed case and investigates further, identifying an alternate suspect. Ormewood reacts with an initial angry outburst, but eventually helps Angie arrest her man. Ormewood later reveals he was being blackmailed by Lou Lou, whose security camera once filmed him viciously beating a suspect. Ormewood admits to suffering anger and violence issues post military service. Later with Will, Angie takes the pregnancy test; it is negative. Will keeps the tape he made earlier.
8	8	"Two Hundred Dollars and a Bus Pass"	Geary McLeod	Karine Rosenthal	February 28, 2023	1LGF08	2.71
Will and Faith attend the apparent drowning suicide of a college student, Alison Schooner. Will notes a subtle knife wound in Alison's neck, establishing she was murdered. Searching Alison's room, Will notes her possessions were kept under lock-and-key and assumes, correctly, she grew up in the foster care system. Will comes to empathize strongly with Alison. While they search the room, another student (Milo) tries to break in but has a seizure and collapses when Will attempts to arrest him. Investigation establishes Alison was participating in a pharmaceutical trial for money and her ex-boyfriend, Jason, is a research assistant in a laboratory running drug trials. Jason has an alibi which is undermined by a fellow research assistant, Darla. At the hospital, Faith discovers Milo's seizure was caused by multiple experimental drugs. Faith flirts awkwardly with the doctor but eventually they swap numbers. The GBI agents are made aware of a thriving black market in experimental drugs at the college, involving Alison. Darla is stabbed and identifies Jason as her attacker. Will and Faith find Jason's body in the basement, an apparent shooting suicide with "I'm Sorry" written on the wall. Will is suspicious and outside Darla's hospital room, stages a scene to suggest Milo has recovered and is willing to talk. Will later catches Darla attempting to murder 'Milo'. Darla was running the lucrative illicit drug business and murdered Alison when she threatened to become a whistleblower. Angie and Ormewood investigate the murder of a magician, stabbed with his own sword, in a retirement home. The detectives eventually find the magician's missing phone, filched by a resident, and discover the magician used his hypnotism skills to steal money from the residents. He was planning to jilt his lover, Nancy the retirement home manager, and run off to the Bahamas. On discovering this, Nancy killed the magician, the murder captured on his phone camera as he self-filmed a promotional video. At Will's house, he, Angie and Nico remember Alison.
9	9	"Manhunt"	Eric Dean Seaton	Adam Toltzis	March 21, 2023	1LGF09	3.24
Convicted cop-killer Sam Laporte escapes custody as he arrives at the courthouse for sentencing. Faith happens to be at the courthouse and Laporte steals a gun and takes her hostage, forcing Faith to discard her gun and drive him away. Will joins the resulting manhunt. Laporte protests his innocence to Faith, and they drive to the residence of a man Laporte maintains can provide him an alibi. APD Officer Tate Grillo appears and kills the man with Faith's gun, which he'd recovered from the courthouse. Grillo then radios in, blaming Faith for the murder and describing her as Laporte's accomplice. Grillo makes to kill Faith, but Laporte distracts him allowing Faith to attack and subdue Grillo. Laporte and Faith escape, Faith reclaiming her gun. Examining the scene, Will is skeptical of Grillo's story and convinces Ormewood. A message from Faith via Betty's social media account ("Bad Bitch Betty") sends Will to re-examine the original case of murdered Officer Hollis. Meanwhile Angie, by chance, sees Lenny Broussard, the foster parent who raped and impregnated her when she was 15. Shaken, Angie attends an AA meeting but finds it unhelpful. Will and Ormewood discover Hollis was collecting evidence proving Grillo was corrupt. Acting on a hunch Will and Ormewood dig up a bamboo patch, finding the evidence. Laporte and Faith are hiding out in a forest cabin. Faith believes Laporte's innocence, and they bond before Grillo arrives. Faith attempts to draw Grillo away, but when Grillo prepares to kill Laporte, Faith emerges to shoot and kill Grillo. The APD arrest Faith but Amanda intervenes. Angie brings in Broussard, who did 12 years in prison for raping Angie. He is alternately remorseful and condescending to Angie, who finds herself unable to interrogate Broussard effectively and lets him go. But she is stunned to see Broussard depart with a new partner and her teenage daughter. At Will's house later, he is concerned with Angie's behavior and the fact she's had a (non-alcoholic) beer. Angie settles with "I've had a tough day".
10	10	"Pterodactyls Can Fly"	Bille Woodruff	Britta Lundin & Inda Craig-Galván	March 28, 2023	1LGF10	3.58
Will is called to the aftermath of a mass shooting in a trailer park, discovering a small boy hiding in one of the trailers. The boy refuses to talk, Will nicknames him 'Scoot'. Will's jaundiced view of the foster care system prevents him surrendering Scoot to child protective services and he takes the boy home. Faith is on administrative leave following the events of the previous episode and her mother, Evelyn, comes to stay with her. Evelyn helps Faith deal with her first experience of killing and encourages Faith to clean up and go to work. Will and Betty get Scoot to talk with the aid of the boy's toy dinosaurs. He reveals his name as Theo Davis and says his mother is away but returning soon. Theo identifies a 'tall man in black' from the trailer park and an injured shooter captured at the scene describes being hired by a similar character. Will and Faith assume the incident concerned a disputed drug deal but are unable to find any drugs. Angie is grappling with emotions over Lenny Broussard. Teaming with Ormewood, Angie seeks out Broussard's fiancee's daughter Crystal at school to warn her about him but succeeds only in antagonizing the girl. Crystal's mother subsequently arrives at the APD office to complain about Angie's harassment. Taken aside by Franklin, Angie admits to concerns over her own sobriety. Theo's grandmother emerges to take him into care, describing Theo's mother as a drug addict. Will drives Theo (and Betty) to the grandmother's hardware store but Theo recognizes one of his new 'uncles' as the man-in-black. Will takes Theo and Betty to hide in the bathroom ceiling while he uses the store stock to subdue the grandmother and her cronies before the police arrive. The trailer park shootings were part of a custody grab by Theo's grandmother. Theo's mother is a healthy nurse. Confronted by Angie outside his apartment building, Broussard shows himself to be unreformed and unrepentant about raping Angie. Angie threatens to kill him and later is shown buying illicit drugs.
11	11	"Bill Black"	Howard Deutch	Daniel Thomsen & Henry "Hank" Jones	April 18, 2023	1LGF11	2.61
Will is working undercover in a joint GBI / DEA operation to identify 'CK', the mysterious leader of a drug gang terrorizing Macon. Will's alias is 'Bill Black’ and he works with gang member Dante. They visit Dante's cousin Rosa, who is attracted to ‘Bill’. Rosa’s father stays in a back room of her apartment. Progress on the case is slow, and Will is also worried about Angie after discovering the heroin she bought, despite Angie denying the drugs were for herself. Dante finally invites ‘Bill’ to meet CK, but on the way they are attacked in a drive-by shooting and Dante is killed. With Faith’s help, Will soon deduces that Rosa is CK, which Rosa confirms saying she had Dante killed due to his 'big mouth' attracting the DEA. She regards 'Bill' as Dante's more capable replacement and as a final test, Rosa orders ‘Bill’ to murder Taylor, a friend of Dante’s. Taylor helps Will stage the murder and Will quickly returns to Rosa’s where he hears her father moaning. Suspicious, he discovers Rosa’s ‘father’ is a kidnapped DEA agent, drugged and being held hostage. Will breaks cover, captures and handcuffs Rosa to the bed before escaping with Taylor and the DEA agent as they are attacked by Rosa’s gang. The DEA arrive in force. In Atlanta, an upset Crystal arrives at the police station and tells Angie she’s been inappropriately touched by Lenny Broussard. Angie later arrives at Broussard’s apartment with the heroin she intends to use against Broussard. She overhears a loud argument inside and bursts in to see a tearful Crystal and her mother, Diane, accusing Lenny of molesting Crystal. Lenny attacks Angie and as they wrestle, Crystal stabs Lenny in the neck with a kitchen knife and he quickly bleeds to death. Angie decides to take the blame and invents a story, including self-inflicted injuries. Ormewood arrives, despite doubting Angie's version of events he helps stage the crime scene. Later, a remorseful Will visits Angie in hospital - realizing for the first time Broussard's reappearance and the effect on Angie - but Angie suggests they end their relationship.
12	12	"Nothing Changed Except for Everything"	Oliver Bokelberg	Karine Rosenthal & Adam Toltzis	April 25, 2023	1LGF12	2.64
In a flashback to 1986, APD patrol officers Amanda Wagner and Evelyn Mitchell find a prostitute’s body with specific torture signs. She was the first victim of a serial killer, eventually a local pimp nicknamed ‘Juice’ was convicted of the crimes. In the modern day Ormewood and Faith Mitchell find two bodies which Amanda is shocked to realize bear similar torture signs to Juice’s victims. Amanda calls in Evelyn to help re-investigate, concerned about Juice's possible innocence. Will connects the contemporary victims to the orphanage where he and Angie were raised. After Paul Campano (see S1 Eps 1 & 2) is attacked but survives, they suspect a child from their orphanage time nicknamed ‘Peepee Percy’. Amanda and Evelyn interview Juice’s lawyer James Ulster who claims Juice, now deceased, was innocent. Amanda flashback-remembers Lucy Morales, a pregnant prostitute she and Evelyn tried to protect during the killings. Will, Angie and Betty visit their old, abandoned orphanage looking for records of Percy. Will quizzes Angie about Lenny Broussard’s death but she tells him to ‘stay out of it’. They scare off the killer who leaves an old photograph of the orphanage kids with the eyes of three children scratched out; the two victims and a boy named David Reynolds, whose body is soon discovered. Will and Ormewood find Percy, now a private investigator, who claims he was hired anonymously to find the orphanage kids, following publicity surrounding Emma Campano's kidnapping (S1 Eps 1 & 2). As past and present conflate, Amanda orders Will off the current case and sends Angie home. Evelyn presses Amanda to "tell Will the truth". In flashback, Amanda and Evelyn search for Lucy only to discover she has become the serial killer's latest victim. An emotional Amanda tells Will the flashback story and that Lucy was Will's mother. Baby Will was found in a dumpster. Amanda doesn't know the identity of Will's father. Upset, Will returns home, discovers evidence of a fight and that Angie is missing; he finds a picture of Angie with the eyes scratched out.
13	13	"A Bad Temper and a Hard Heart"	Holly Dale	Liz Heldens & Kath Lingenfelter	May 2, 2023	1LGF13	3.32
Will reconstructs Angie's abduction and realizes Betty was manhandled by the kidnapper, imparting a scent later recognized by Paul Campano from his assault. Will also finds his tape-recorder, hidden by Angie and containing a physical description of her masked assailant. Will reviews the “Juice killings” case files and sees pictures of his mother, Lucy Morales, for the first time. He notes she was kept alive far longer than other victims and assumes the killer had feelings for her. Evelyn says Lucy, while held captive, died in childbirth. Will feels misplaced guilt and deduces the killer blames Will for Lucy’s death. Will calls in Detective Bonnie from the original Juice case. Will and Faith soon identify Bonnie himself as a suspect, based on Angie's description and James Ulster's notes. Amanda and Evelyn interview Ulster in his bar hangout, who confirms Bonnie was known to assault and choke prostitutes. Will, Faith and Ormewood's attempt to arrest Bonnie becomes a gun battle ended by Ormewood wounding Bonnie. But soon a new body is found, and the killer calls and taunts Will, clearing Bonnie. While ruminating on his mother and the case notes, Will realizes Ulster faked the evidence implicating Bonnie. Angie escapes the killer’s basement and calls Will but is violently halted by the killer, James Ulster. Will says “Hello James” down the phone. Will travels to Ulster’s house alone and unarmed, Ulster’s conditions for keeping Angie alive. Meanwhile Campano identifies the key odor as a hand-soap used in Ulster’s favorite bar, alerting Amanda to Ulster's guilt. At Ulster’s house he desires Will to witness him murdering Angie in retribution for Will 'killing' Lucy. Will disarms and beats Ulster severely and prepares to kill him but stops as Angie awakens. The unconscious Ulster is arrested and requires life support, while Angie goes to surgery. Evelyn tells Will that after finding Lucy's body, Amanda searched for and discovered baby Will, named him after her grandmother (Martha Trent) but wasn't allowed to adopt him. Amanda feels shame over Will's subsequent childhood. Will quietly thanks Amanda, who gives him Lucy's medallion necklace.

=== Season 2 (2024) ===
No. overall	No. in season	Title	Directed by	Written by	Original release date	Prod. code	U.S. viewers (millions)
14	1	"Me Llamo Will Trent"	Howard Deutch	Liz Heldens & Britta Lundin	February 20, 2024	2LGF01	4.77
15	2	"It's the Work I Signed Up For"	Eric Dean Seaton	Daniel Thomsen & Inda Craig-Galván	February 27, 2024	2LGF02	3.97
16	3	"You Don't Have to Understand"	Jason Ensler	Karine Rosenthal	March 5, 2024	2LGF03	4.83
17	4	"It's Easier to Handcuff a Human Being"	Patricia Cardoso	Henry "Hank" Jones & Adam Toltzis	March 26, 2024	2LGF04	4.41
18	5	"Capt. Duke Wagner's Daughter"	Holly Dale	Inda Craig-Galván & Rebecca Murga	April 2, 2024	2LGF05	4.35
19	6	"We Are Family"	Lea Thompson	Britta Lundin & Aja Hoggatt	April 9, 2024	2LGF06	4.28
20	7	"Have You Never Been to a Wedding?"	Michael Lehmann	Liz Heldens & Adam Toltzis	April 30, 2024	2LGF07	4.69
21	8	"Why Is Jack's Arm Bleeding?"	Keith Powell	Karine Rosenthal & Henry "Hank" Jones	May 7, 2024	2LGF08	3.72
22	9	"Residente o Visitante"	Sheree Folkson	Daniel Thomsen & Rebecca Murga	May 14, 2024	2LGF09	3.89
23	10	"Do You See the Vision?"	Liz Heldens	Liz Heldens & Kath Lingenfelter	May 21, 2024	2LGF10	4.08

=== Season 3 (2025) ===
No. overall	No. in season	Title	Directed by	Written by	Original release date	Prod. code	U.S. viewers (millions)
24	1	"I'm a Guest Here"	Ramón Rodríguez	Liz Heldens & Daniel Thomsen	January 7, 2025	3LGF01	5.91
Six months later, an unkempt, guilt-ridden Will (with Betty) is hiding out in a small Tennessee town. Angie is working as a security guard while awaiting a hearing. Franklin, Angie's concerned AA sponsor, visits but Angie's desire to remember everything concerning Crystal is maintaining her sobriety. Amanda forces Will to return to Atlanta and the GBI following the targeted murder of an off-duty cop. The prime suspect, gang leader Rafael Wexford, demands to speak to Will only. Will knows Wexford from a childhood foster house run by Wexford's grandmother. When they meet, Wexford says he's being framed and solicits Will's help, mentioning a debt owed. Will reluctantly joins Faith and Ormewood to investigate. As they proceed, Wexford suddenly surrenders to police and confesses to orchestrating the killing. Privately with Will, Wexford doesn't explain himself but reminds Will owes him "big time" and says he needs help "more than ever". When meeting with ADA Marion Alba, Will realizes the murdered officer was seeking to expose corruption within the APD. Will discovers Wexford has a daughter, Sunny, in foster-care who has been kidnapped and used to coerce Wexford.
25	2	"Sunny-Side Up"	Eric Dean Seaton	Juliet Lashinsky-Revene & Henry "Hank" Jones	January 14, 2025	3LGF02	5.70
Will has an uncomfortable reunion with the resentful Nico but deliberately avoids Angie. Alba agrees to stall Wexford's prosecution while the GBI continue to investigate, defying pressure from the mayor. Will, Alba and Ormewood uncover a stolen car racket, with the trail leading to police Captain Cromwell. Using a computer game, Amanda is able to communicate with Sunny and realizes she is being held in a police safe house containing a trackable phone. Sunny pockets the phone as Cromwell arrives to move her to more secluded location. Following Amanda's instructions, Sunny escapes the trunk of Cromwell's car. Events lead to a shootout in a suburban mall; Will is shot but unharmed while wearing a bulletproof vest, Faith and Ormewood subdue and arrest Cromwell. Sunny is rescued and Wexford released. During transport to court, Cromwell is shot and killed. Will realizes the mayor's involvement in the racket and arrests her; she denies involvement in Cromwell's shooting. Convinced he now belongs back at work, Will has a shave and haircut and dons his three-piece suit. He surmises Wexford had Cromwell murdered in retribution for Sunny's kidnapping, which Wexford doesn't deny. Amanda becomes Sunny's new foster-parent. Angie's hearing commences.
26	3	"Find a New Pond"	Howard Deutch	Karine Rosenthal	January 21, 2025	3LGF03	5.53
27	4	"Floor Is Lava"	Keith Powell	Britta Lundin	January 28, 2025	3LGF04	4.54
28	5	"Breathe with Me"	Gregory Smith	Inda Craig-Galván	February 4, 2025	3LGF05	4.63
29	6	"No Faith In Second Chances"	Sheree Folkson	Kath Lingenfelter	February 11, 2025	3LGF06	5.06
30	7	"Mariachi Shelly's Frankenstein"	Holly Dale	Adam Toltzis	February 18, 2025	3LGF07	4.66
31	8	"Abigail B."	Gail Mancuso	Antoine Niguel Perry	February 25, 2025	3LGF08	4.61
32	9	"This Kid's Gonna Be Alright"	Holly Dale	Henry "Hank" Jones	March 11, 2025	3LGF09	4.48
33	10	"Regarding the Death of Whitney McAdams"	Lea Thompson	Aja Hoggatt	March 18, 2025	3LGF10	4.37
34	11	"Best of Your Recollection"	Crystle Roberson Dorsey	Rebecca Murga	March 25, 2025	3LGF11	4.58
35	12	"You're the Worst Person In the World"	Natalia Anderson	Laura Snow	April 1, 2025	3LGF12	4.30
36	13	"One of Us Now"	Howard Deutch	Juliet Lashinsky-Revene	April 8, 2025	3LGF13	4.15
37	14	"A Funeral Fit for a Quartermaine"	Angela Barnes	Daniel Thomsen	April 15, 2025	3LGF14	4.11
38	15	"The Most Beautiful, Fierce, Smart, Powerful Creature in the Entire World"	Oz Rodriguez	Britta Lundin & Juliette Strangio	April 22, 2025	3LGF15	4.33
39	16	"Push, Jump, Fall"	Mark Tonderai	Henry "Hank" Jones & Adam Toltzis	April 29, 2025	3LGF16	3.80
40	17	"Why Hello, Sheriff"	Erika Christensen	Karine Rosenthal & Jordan Pope	May 6, 2025	3LGF17	4.27
41	18	"Listening to a Heartbeat"	Howie Deutch	Liz Heldens & Inda Craig-Galván	May 13, 2025	3LGF18	4.15

=== Season 4 (2026) ===
No. overall	No. in season	Title	Directed by	Written by	Original release date	Prod. code	U.S. viewers (millions)
42	1	"... Speaking of Sharks" "...Speaking of Sharks"	Ramón Rodríguez	Liz Heldens & Britta Lundin	January 6, 2026	4LGF01	N/A
43	2	"Love Takes Time"	Jason Ensler	Kath Lingenfelter & Daniel T. Thomsen	January 13, 2026	4LGF02	N/A
44	3	"Studio 4B"	Keith Powell	Juliet Lashinsky-Revene	January 20, 2026	4LGF03	N/A
45	4	"The Man From Nowhere"	Holly Dale	Rebecca Murga	January 27, 2026	4LGF04	N/A
46	5	"Nice to Meet You, Malcolm"	Eduardo Sánchez	Inda Craig-Galván	February 3, 2026	4LGF05	N/A
47	6	"You're Not That Person Anymore"	Howard Deutch	Karine Rosenthal & Alan C. Beard	February 10, 2026	4LGF06	N/A
48	7	"CALL PAUL" "Call Paul"	Jason Ensler	Henry "Hank" Jones	February 17, 2026	4LGF07	N/A
49	8	"We're Looking for a Vampire"	Gail Mancuso	Britta Lundin	February 24, 2026	4LGF08	N/A
50	9	"It Was a Meat Cute"	Iantha Richardson	Adam Toltzis	March 3, 2026	4LGF09	N/A
51	10	"You're Only as Sick as Your Secrets"	Sheree Folkson	Antoine Niguel Perry	March 10, 2026	4LGF10	N/A
52	11	"He Lives!"	Ramón Rodríguez	Juliet Lashinsky-Revene	March 17, 2026	4LGF11	N/A
53	12	"I Hear It Now, I Was Good"	Natalia Anderson	Aja Hoggatt	March 24, 2026	4LGF12	N/A
54	13	"Did I Screw This Up?"	Jason Ensler	Inda Craig-Galván	March 31, 2026	4LGF13	N/A
55	14	"A Flag in the Mud"	Thembi L. Banks	Adam Toltzis	April 7, 2026	4LGF14	N/A
56	15	"The Blank Expanse of Nothing"	Natalia Anderson	Britta Lundin	April 14, 2026	4LGF15	N/A
57	16	"Our Last Dance"	Ramón Rodríguez	Henry "Hank" Jones	April 21, 2026	4LGF16	N/A
58	17	"Where'd You Come From, Little Angel?"	Holly Dale	Karine Rosenthal & Kath Lingenfelter	April 28, 2026	4LGF17	N/A
59	18	"Be of Service"	Jason Ensler	Inda Craig-Galván	May 5, 2026	4LGF18	N/A

== Production ==
=== Development ===
In February 2022, ABC ordered a pilot for Will Trent, based on Karin Slaughter's Will Trent novel series, with Liz Heldens and Daniel Thomsen set to write and executive produce, and Slaughter also to executive produce, with 20th Television as the studio. In August 2022, ABC ordered the series for 2022–23 mid-season. On April 18, 2023, ABC renewed the series for a second season, which premiered on February 20, 2024. On April 3, 2024, ABC renewed the series for a third season, which premiered on January 7, 2025. On April 3, 2025, ABC renewed the series for a fourth season. On April 13, 2026, ABC renewed the series for a fifth season.

=== Casting ===
Ramón Rodríguez was cast in the lead role in April 2022, with Erika Christensen cast as Angie Polaski. In May 2022, Iantha Richardson was cast as Faith, Jake McLaughlin as Michael, and Sonja Sohn as Amanda. In August 2024, Gina Rodriguez joined the cast as a new series regular for the third season. In August 2025, Kevin Daniels was promoted as a series regular for the fourth season.

=== Filming ===
Production for the first season of Will Trent started in Atlanta on October 10, 2022, and concluded on February 20, 2023.

== Broadcast ==
Will Trent premiered on January 3, 2023, on ABC. The second season premiered on February 20, 2024. The third season premiered on January 7, 2025. The fourth season premiered on January 6, 2026. The fifth season is set to premiere on January 5, 2027.

As part of global licensing agreement between Disney Entertainment and Netflix, the first 4 seasons of the series began streaming on Netflix worldwide starting November 3, 2026.

== Reception ==
=== Critical response ===
For the first season, the review aggregator website Rotten Tomatoes reported an 89% approval rating based on 9 critics' reviews, with an average rating of 7/10. Metacritic, which uses a weighted average, assigned a score of 71 out of 100 based on 7 critics, indicating "generally favorable reviews".

Daniel Fienberg of The Hollywood Reporter, wrote that it "quickly emerges as an above-average broadcast TV procedural". Reviewing the series for The A.V. Club, Max Gao gave a B− and stated, "It will welcome viewers who have never read the source material, but it risks alienating longtime fans of Slaughter's books."

=== Ratings ===
==== Overall ====
Viewership and ratings per season of Will Trent
Season	Timeslot (ET)	Episodes	First aired		Last aired		TV season	Viewership rank	Avg. viewers (millions)	18–49 rank	Avg. 18–49 rating
Season	Timeslot (ET)	Episodes	Date	Viewers (millions)	Date	Viewers (millions)	TV season	Viewership rank	Avg. viewers (millions)	18–49 rank	Avg. 18–49 rating
1	Tuesday 10:00 p.m.	13	January 3, 2023	3.61	May 2, 2023	3.32	2022–23	33	5.99	51	0.58
2	Tuesday 8:00 p.m.	10	February 20, 2024	4.77	May 21, 2024	4.08	2023–24	23	6.64	47	0.53
3	Tuesday 8:00 p.m. (1–15, 17–18); Tuesday 9:00 p.m. (16)	18	January 7, 2025	5.91	May 13, 2025	4.15	2024–25	TBD	TBD	TBD	TBD
4	Tuesday 8:00 p.m.	TBA	January 6, 2026	TBD	May 5, 2026	TBD	2025–26	TBD	TBD	TBD	TBD

==== Season 1 ====
Viewership and ratings per episode of Will Trent
No.	Title	Air date	Rating (18–49)	Viewers (millions)	DVR (18–49)	DVR viewers (millions)	Total (18–49)	Total viewers (millions)
1	"Pilot"	January 3, 2023	0.4	3.61	0.3	2.96	0.6	6.57
2	"I'm a Pretty Observant Guy"	January 10, 2023	0.3	2.95	0.3	2.89	0.6	5.85
3	"Don't Let It Happen Again"	January 17, 2023	0.4	3.32	0.3	3.19	0.7	6.51
4	"My Stupid Detective Brain"	January 24, 2023	0.3	3.04	—N/a	—N/a	—N/a	—N/a
5	"The Look Out"	January 31, 2023	0.3	3.22	—N/a	—N/a	—N/a	—N/a
6	"Should I Go Get My Tin Foil Hat?"	February 14, 2023	0.3	2.89	—N/a	—N/a	—N/a	—N/a
7	"Unable to Locate"	February 21, 2023	0.3	2.63	—N/a	—N/a	—N/a	—N/a
8	"Two Hundred Dollars and a Bus Pass"	February 28, 2023	0.3	2.71	—N/a	—N/a	—N/a	—N/a
9	"Manhunt"	March 21, 2023	0.3	3.24	—N/a	—N/a	—N/a	—N/a
10	"Pterodactyls Can Fly"	March 28, 2023	0.3	3.58	—N/a	—N/a	—N/a	—N/a
11	"Bill Black"	April 18, 2023	0.3	2.61	—N/a	—N/a	—N/a	—N/a
12	"Nothing Changed Except for Everything""	April 25, 2023	0.2	2.64	—N/a	—N/a	—N/a	—N/a
13	"A Bad Temper and a Hard Heart"	May 2, 2023	0.3	3.32	—N/a	—N/a	—N/a	—N/a

==== Season 2 ====
Viewership and ratings per episode of Will Trent
No.	Title	Air date	Rating (18–49)	Viewers (millions)	Ref.
1	"Me Llamo Will Trent"	February 20, 2024	0.3	4.77	
2	"It's the Work I Signed Up For"	February 27, 2024	0.4	3.97	
3	"You Don't Have to Understand"	March 5, 2024	0.4	4.83	
4	"It's Easier to Handcuff a Human Being"	March 26, 2024	0.3	4.41	
5	"Capt. Duke Wagner's Daughter"	April 2, 2024	0.4	4.27	
6	"We Are Family"	April 9, 2024	0.3	4.29	
7	"Have You Never Been to a Wedding?"	April 30, 2024	0.3	4.59	
8	"Why Is Jack's Arm Bleeding?"	May 7, 2024	0.3	3.71	
9	"Residente o Visitante"	May 14, 2024	0.3	3.89	
10	"Do You See the Vision?"	May 21, 2024	0.3	4.08	

==== Season 3 ====
Viewership and ratings per episode of Will Trent
No.	Title	Air date	Rating/share (18–49)	Viewers (millions)	Ref.
1	"I'm a Guest Here"	January 7, 2025	0.5	5.91	
2	"Sunny-Side Up"	January 14, 2025	0.5	5.70	
3	"You're the One I Want Watching My Back"	January 21, 2025	0.4	5.53	
4	"Floor Is Lava"	January 28, 2025	0.3	4.54	
5	"Breathe with Me"	February 4, 2025	0.3	4.63	
6	"No Faith in Second Chances"	February 11, 2025	0.4	5.06	
7	"Mariachi Shelly's Frankenstein"	February 18, 2025	0.4	4.66	
8	"Abigail B."	February 25, 2025	0.3	4.61	
9	"This Kid's Gonna Be Alright"	March 11, 2025	0.3	4.48	
10	"Regarding the Death of Whitney McAdams"	March 18, 2025	0.3	4.37	
11	"Best of Your Recollection"	March 25, 2025	0.4	4.58	
12	"You're the Worst Person In the World"	April 1, 2025	0.3	4.30	
13	"One of Us Now"	April 8, 2025	0.3	4.15	
14	"A Funeral Fit for a Quartermaine"	April 15, 2025	0.3	4.11	
15	"The Most Beautiful, Fierce, Smart, Powerful Creature in the Entire World"	April 22, 2025	0.3	4.33	
16	"Push, Jump, Fall"	April 29, 2025	0.3	3.80	
17	"Why Hello, Sheriff"	May 6, 2025	0.3	4.27	
18	"Listening to a Heartbeat"	May 13, 2025	0.3	4.15	

=== Accolades ===
List of awards and nominations received by Will Trent
Year	Award	Category	Nominee(s)	Result	Ref.
2024	Astra TV Awards	Best Broadcast Network Drama Series	Will Trent	Won	
2024	Astra TV Awards	Best Actor in a Broadcast Network or Cable Drama Series	Ramón Rodríguez	Nominated	
2024	Astra TV Awards	Best Actress in a Broadcast Network or Cable Drama Series	Erika Christensen	Nominated	
2024	Astra TV Awards	Best Supporting Actress in a Broadcast Network or Cable Drama Series	Sonja Sohn	Nominated	
2024	Astra TV Awards	Best Directing in a Broadcast Network or Cable Series Drama	Howard Deutch (for "Bill Black")	Nominated	
2024	Astra TV Awards	Best Writing in a Broadcast Network or Cable Drama Series	Liz Heldens and Kath Lingenfelter (for "A Bad Temper and a Hard Heart")	Nominated	
2024	Astra TV Awards	Best Broadcast Network Drama Series	Will Trent	Won	
2024	Astra TV Awards	Best Actor in a Broadcast Network or Cable Drama Series	Ramón Rodríguez	Won	
2024	Astra TV Awards	Best Actress in a Broadcast Network or Cable Drama Series	Erika Christensen	Nominated	
2024	Astra TV Awards	Best Supporting Actor in a Broadcast Network or Cable Drama Series	Jake McLaughlin	Nominated	
2024	Astra TV Awards	Best Supporting Actress in a Broadcast Network or Cable Drama Series	Sonja Sohn	Nominated	
2024	Astra TV Awards	Best Directing in a Broadcast Network or Cable Series Drama	Howard Deutch (for "Me Llamo Will Trent")	Nominated	
2024	Astra TV Awards	Best Guest Actor in a Drama Series	John Ortiz	Nominated	
2024	Astra TV Awards	Best Guest Actress in a Drama Series	Susan Kelechi Watson	Nominated	
2024	Critics' Choice Television Awards	Best Actor in a Drama Series	Ramón Rodríguez	Nominated	
2025	Astra TV Awards	Best Drama Series	Will Trent	Nominated	
2025	Astra TV Awards	Best Actor in a Drama Series	Ramón Rodríguez	Nominated	
2025	Astra TV Awards	Best Guest Actor in a Drama Series	Yul Vazquez	Nominated	
2025	Astra TV Awards	Best Cast Ensemble in a Broadcast Network Drama Series	Will Trent	Nominated	
2025	Astra TV Awards	Best Directing in a Drama Series	Ramón Rodríguez (for "I'm a Guest Here")	Won	
2025	Astra TV Awards	Best Writing in a Drama Series	Rebecca Murga (for "Best of Your Recollection")	Nominated	
2025	Gracie Awards	Showrunner Fiction	Liz Heldens	Won	
2025	Primetime Emmy Awards	Outstanding Choreography for Scripted Programming	Danielle Sten and Lance Guillermo	Nominated	
