= Astra TV Award for Best Broadcast Network Drama Series =

Award presented by the Hollywood Creative Alliance

Astra Award for Best Broadcast Network Drama Series
- Awarded for: Outstanding drama series on broadcast television
- Country: United States
- Presented by: Hollywood Creative Alliance
- First award: 2021
- Currently held by: Will Trent (2024)

The Astra Award for Best Streaming Drama Series is an annual award presented by the Hollywood Creative Alliance to honor the best drama television series on streaming television. It has been given since its inaugural edition.

== Winners and nominations ==
Winners are listed first in colored row and highlighted in boldface, followed by other nominees.

Year	Program	Network
2021 (1st)
2021 (1st)	**New Amsterdam**	**NBC**
2021 (1st)	Big Sky	ABC
2021 (1st)	The Good Doctor	ABC
2021 (1st)	Law & Order: Organized Crime	NBC
2021 (1st)	Superman & Lois	The CW
2021 (1st)	This Is Us	NBC
2022 (2nd)
2022 (2nd)	**This Is Us**	**NBC**
2022 (2nd)	9-1-1: Lone Star	Fox
2022 (2nd)	The Cleaning Lady	Fox
2022 (2nd)	Grey's Anatomy	ABC
2022 (2nd)	Kung Fu	The CW
2022 (2nd)	Law & Order: Special Victims Unit	NBC
2022 (2nd)	New Amsterdam	NBC
2022 (2nd)	Superman & Lois	The CW
2023 (3rd)
2023 (3rd)	**Will Trent**	**ABC**
2023 (3rd)	9-1-1	Fox
2023 (3rd)	Alaska Daily	ABC
2023 (3rd)	Chicago Fire	NBC
2023 (3rd)	The Cleaning Lady	Fox
2023 (3rd)	Grey's Anatomy	ABC
2023 (3rd)	Law & Order	NBC
2023 (3rd)	Law & Order: Special Victims Unit	NBC
2023 (3rd)	New Amsterdam	NBC
2023 (3rd)	Quantum Leap	NBC
2024 (4th)
2024 (4th)	**Will Trent**	**ABC**
2024 (4th)	9-1-1	ABC
2024 (4th)	The Cleaning Lady	Fox
2024 (4th)	Elsbeth	CBS
2024 (4th)	The Equalizer	CBS
2024 (4th)	The Good Doctor	ABC
2024 (4th)	Grey's Anatomy	ABC
2024 (4th)	Law & Order: Special Victims Unit	NBC
