= Man of Steel (film) =

2013 film by Zack Snyder

- Theatrical release poster
- Directed by: Zack Snyder
- Screenplay by: David S. Goyer
- Story by: David S. Goyer; Christopher Nolan
- Based on: Characters appearing in comic books published by DC Entertainment
- Produced by: Charles Roven; Christopher Nolan; Emma Thomas; Deborah Snyder
- Starring: Henry Cavill; Amy Adams; Michael Shannon; Kevin Costner; Diane Lane; Laurence Fishburne; Antje Traue; Ayelet Zurer; Christopher Meloni; Russell Crowe
- Cinematography: Amir Mokri
- Edited by: David Brenner
- Music by: Hans Zimmer
- Production companies: Warner Bros. Pictures; Legendary Pictures; DC Entertainment; Syncopy; Peters Entertainment
- Distributed by: Warner Bros. Pictures
- Release dates: June 10, 2013 (Alice Tully Hall); June 14, 2013 (United States)
- Running time: 143 minutes
- Countries: United States; United Kingdom
- Language: English
- Budget: $225 million
- Box office: $670.1 million

Man of Steel is a 2013 superhero film based on the DC Comics character Superman. Directed by Zack Snyder and written by David S. Goyer, who developed the story with producer Christopher Nolan, it is the first film in the DC Extended Universe (DCEU), and a reboot of the Superman film series, depicting the character's origin story. Henry Cavill stars as Superman, alongside Amy Adams, Michael Shannon, Kevin Costner, Diane Lane, Laurence Fishburne, and Russell Crowe. In the film, Clark Kent learns that he is a superpowered alien from the planet Krypton and assumes the role of mankind's protector as Superman, making the choice to face General Zod and stop him from destroying humanity.

Development began in 2008 when Warner Bros. Pictures took pitches from comic book writers, screenwriters, and directors, opting to reboot the franchise. In 2009, a court ruling resulted in Jerry Siegel's family recapturing the rights to Superman's origins and Siegel's copyright. The decision stated that Warner Bros. did not owe the families additional royalties from previous films, but if they did not begin production on a Superman film by 2011, then the Shuster and Siegel estates would be able to sue for lost revenue on an unproduced film. Nolan pitched Goyer's idea after a story discussion on The Dark Knight Rises, and Snyder was hired as the film's director in October 2010. Principal photography began in August 2011 in West Chicago, Illinois, before moving to Vancouver and Plano, Illinois.

Man of Steel premiered in the Alice Tully Hall in New York City on June 10, 2013, and was released by Warner Bros. Pictures in the United States on June 14. The film received mixed reviews from critics, and was a commercial success, grossing $670 million worldwide on a budget of $225–258 million, becoming the ninth-highest-grossing film of 2013. Critics praised its visuals, music, casting, performances, and action sequences, but criticized its dark tone and some plot elements, as well as the portrayal of Superman. A sequel, Batman v Superman: Dawn of Justice, was released in 2016. A further reboot, Superman, the first film in the DC Universe (DCU), was released in 2025, and stars David Corenswet as the title character.

== Plot ==
The planet Krypton is destabilizing due to reckless mining of the planetary core. The Kryptonian Council ignores the warnings of renowned scientist Jor-El, who then steals and infuses the Kryptonian genetics codex into his new-born son, Kal-El, the first naturally-born Kryptonian in centuries. Jor-El and his wife Lara manage to evacuate Kal-El in a spacecraft toward Earth before Jor-El is killed by General Zod during a coup d'état. Zod's insurrection is stopped by the Kryptonian Council; he and his followers are sent into the Phantom Zone as punishment. Krypton is destroyed, along with all its remaining inhabitants.

Kal-El lands in Kansas, where he is adopted by Jonathan and Martha Kent and named Clark. As he grows older, due to his Kryptonian physiology and Earth's yellow sun, he develops superhuman powers that Jonathan urges him to keep hidden until he is mature enough to handle the global consequences, even refusing Clark's help years later, leading to his death in a storm. Burdened with guilt, Clark travels the globe hiding under various aliases, seeking his purpose, and discreetly helping those in need.

Daily Planet reporter Lois Lane investigates the discovery of a Kryptonian scout ship in the Arctic. Disguised as a worker, Clark enters the ship. He learns from its artificial intelligence, modeled after Jor-El, about his origins, and that Clark was sent to Earth with the hope he would guide its people. While following Clark, Lois inadvertently triggers the ship's security system. Clark uses his powers to rescue her. Wearing a uniform provided by the ship, he begins testing his abilities. Unable to convince her editor-in-chief, Perry White, to publish an article on the incident, Lois leaks the story to a popular blogger. She tracks down Clark in Smallville intent on exposing him. However, upon hearing of Jonathan Kent's sacrifice, Lois decides to keep Clark's identity safe, while fueling Perry's suspicions.

Zod and his followers are revealed to have been released from the Phantom Zone when Krypton was destroyed. They retrofitted their prison vessel into a functioning ship and salvaged several xenoforming devices from abandoned Kryptonian outposts. Waiting thirty-three years for a sign of Kryptonian survival, they are drawn to Earth when Clark accessed the ancient scout ship. Zod threatens Earth unless Clark surrenders to him; Clark reveals himself to U.S. military personnel and surrenders to their custody. Lois is also captured by the military due to her leaked story.

Clark negotiates a meeting with Zod, who demands Clark and Lois join him on his ship. Onboard, Zod infiltrates their minds, revealing his intention to xenoform Earth into a new Krypton once he is in possession of the codex, which will result in humanity's extinction. Clark refuses to join Zod. Using the Jor-El AI to temporarily take over the ship, he and Lois escape. Intending to use the codex to repopulate his species, Zod investigates Clark's pod in Smallville. However, the codex cannot be found and Zod angrily threatens Martha. Clark fights off Zod's followers across Smallville, convincing the military of his allegiance to Earth.

Zod's science officer, Jax-Ur, discovers Jor-El hid the codex's information within Clark's genes, the extraction of which would be fatal. Zod nevertheless deploys his xenoforming device, the World Engine to the Indian Ocean, while descending his ship over Metropolis. The two work in concert to xenoform Earth, severely damaging Metropolis. Clark, now dubbed "Superman" by Lois, destroys the World Engine while the military launches an attack on Zod's primary vessel, utilizing Clark's pod to create a singularity. The attack is successful, sending Zod's troops back to the Phantom Zone. With his ship destroyed and Krypton's only hope of revival gone, a vengeful Zod vows to destroy Earth and its inhabitants. He and Clark engage in a cataclysmic battle across Metropolis, which concludes when Clark is forced to kill Zod as he attacks a family trapped in a train station.

Sometime later, Clark, as Superman, persuades the government to let him act independently, promising not to turn against humanity. To gain covert access to dangerous situations, Clark takes a job reporting for the Daily Planet alongside Lois.

== Cast ==
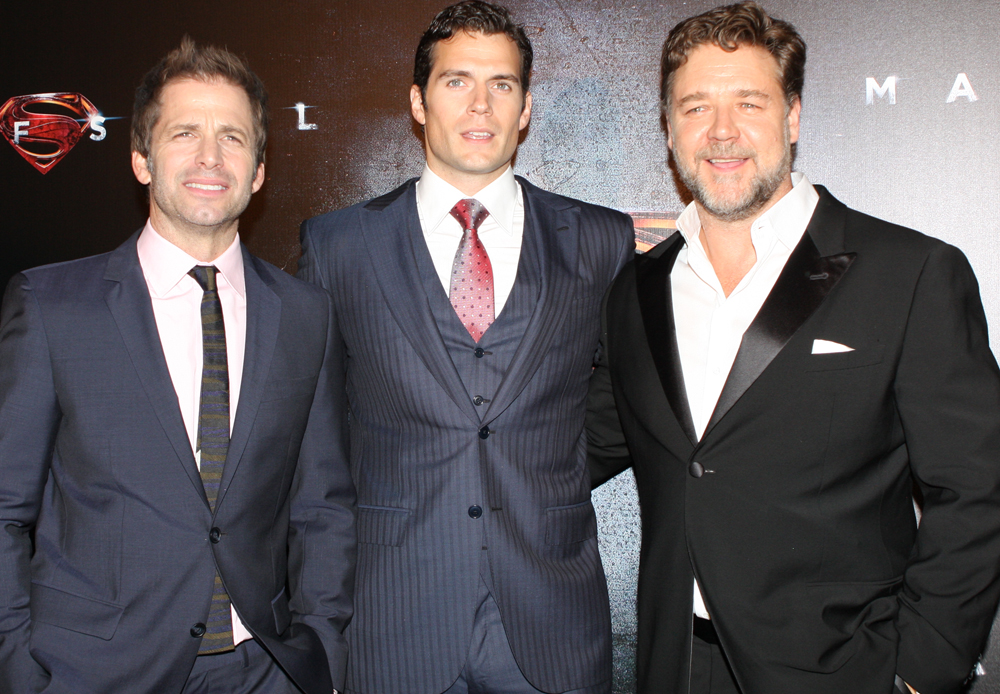
Left to right: director Zack Snyder with actors Henry Cavill and Russell Crowe, at the world premiere of Man of Steel in Sydney, Australia, 2013

- Henry Cavill as Kal-El / Clark Kent:
  A Kryptonian with superhuman powers and abilities, sent by his parents to Earth as an infant to escape the destruction of his homeworld, Krypton, and raised under the mental guidance of farmers in Smallville, Kansas, until he is inspired by the holographic message from his late father to become Earth's greatest protector. Cavill is the first non-American actor to play the character. He was previously cast in Superman: Flyby, which was ultimately shelved, and was considered for the role in the 2006 film Superman Returns, but lost to Brandon Routh. Cavill stated, "There's a very real story behind the Superman character." He explained that everyone's goal has been to explore the difficulties his character faces as a result of having multiple identities—including his birth name, Kal-El, and his alter ego, Clark Kent. Cavill also stated that "He's alone and there's no one like him," referring to Superman's vulnerabilities. "That must be incredibly scary and lonely, not to know who you are or what you are, and trying to find out what makes sense. Where's your baseline? What do you draw from? Where do you draw a limit with the power you have? In itself, that's an incredible weakness." In an interview with Total Film magazine, Cavill stated he had been consuming nearly 5,000 calories a day, training for over two hours daily and plowing protein to pack on the muscle mass. Tyler Hoechlin (who would later play the character in the Arrowverse and Superman & Lois), Matthew Goode, Armie Hammer, Jamie Dornan, Joe Manganiello and Colin O'Donoghue were also considered for the role. Manganiello was subsequently cast as Deathstroke in Justice League. Manganiello was Snyder's second choice behind Cavill. Cavill cited his inspiration for his portrayal for Superman was by four comics The Death of Superman, The Return of Superman, Superman: Red Son and Superman/Batman: The Search for Kryptonite; as he wanted his interpretation be from the source material. Cooper Timberline was cast as the 9-year-old Clark Kent, and Dylan Sprayberry was cast as the 13-year-old Clark Kent.
- Amy Adams as Lois Lane:
  A reporter for the Daily Planet newspaper and the love interest of Clark Kent. Adams was selected from a list of actresses that included Kristen Stewart, Zoe Saldaña, Olivia Wilde, and Mila Kunis. "There was a big, giant search for Lois," Snyder said. "For us, it was a big thing and obviously a really important role. We did a lot of auditioning, but we had this meeting with Amy Adams and after that I just felt she was perfect for it." Adams auditioned for the role three times: once for the unproduced Superman: Flyby, and the second time for Superman Returns before landing the current role. Adams was confirmed to play Lois Lane in March 2011. While announcing the role, Snyder said in a statement, "We are excited to announce the casting of Amy Adams, one of the most versatile and respected actresses in films today. Amy has the talent to capture all of the qualities we love about Lois: smart, tough, funny, warm, ambitious and, of course, beautiful." On portraying Lois Lane, Adams stated that the film would feature a Lois Lane who is an "independent, feisty woman ... but set in a more identifiable world." Adams said that "She has become more of a free-ranging journalist, someone who likes to be hands-on. The nature of the newspaper business has changed so much. There is so much more pressure."
- Michael Shannon as General Zod:
  A Kryptonian general with the same superpowers as Superman, bent on transforming Earth into a new Krypton under his reign. Viggo Mortensen and Daniel Day-Lewis were also considered for the role. Snyder stated, "Zod is not only one of Superman's most formidable enemies, but one of the most significant because he has insights into Superman that others don't. Michael is a powerful actor who can project both the intelligence and the malice of the character, making him perfect for the role." When Goyer was asked about why Zod was chosen as the villain, he stated, "The way (Christopher) Nolan and I have always approached movies as well is you never say, 'Hey, which villain would be cool for this movie?' You start with the story first. What kind of story? What kind of theme do you want to tell? So we worked that out. Then, usually the villain becomes obvious in terms of who's going to be the appropriate antagonist for that. When you guys see the movie, the only villain we could've used was Zod and the Kryptonians. I mean, when you see what the whole story is, nothing else would have even made sense."
- Kevin Costner as Jonathan Kent:
  Clark's adoptive father. Snyder explained his reason for casting the on-screen couple is solely for the realism: "I think the thing you realize when you look at Diane and Kevin, in our decision to cast them so far, you sort of get a sense of how tonally we're looking at the movie, and what you realize is that those guys are serious actors, and we're taking this movie very seriously in terms of the tone of having those guys. You're talking about having a situation where whatever the action is or whatever the drama of the movie is, our first priority is to make sure it's rendered in the most realistic way we can get at." After taking on the role, Costner was disappointed when he read the script.
- Diane Lane as Martha Kent:
  Clark's adoptive mother. Lane was the first cast member to join the film after Cavill. "This was a very important piece of casting for me because Martha Kent is the woman whose values helped shape the man we know as Superman," Snyder said in the release. "We are thrilled to have Diane in the role because she can convey the wisdom and the wonder of a woman whose son has powers beyond her imagination."
- Laurence Fishburne as Perry White:
  Editor-in-chief of the Daily Planet and the boss of Lois Lane. Fishburne is the first African-American to play Perry White in a live-action film. Fishburne remarked of his role: "[M]y inspiration really is the late Ed Bradley, who was a CBS correspondent on 60 Minutes for many years ... [The] legendary Ed Bradley ... was a friend, a mentor, and a role model for me, particularly because he worked in journalism, and he was the kind of guy who walked with kings, but he had the common touch. And so he was my inspiration for Perry."
- Antje Traue as Faora-Ul:
  General Zod's sub-commander and a commander of the Kryptonian military, who is completely devoted and loyal to Zod. Gal Gadot was offered the role but declined because she was pregnant at that time; this allowed her to be later cast as Wonder Woman in the film's sequel. Alice Eve, Diane Kruger and Rosamund Pike were also considered for the role. About the role of Faora, Traue said in an interview: "What I liked about her was that as a woman, we have certain doubts and we think too much sometimes about ourselves and all these things, they're not there for Faora. She's a bred warrior. So to really focus on that aspect, that fear is a chemical reaction and that it was bred out of her and she doesn't have it. It's liberating when you actually think about it. That you're just a one-track mind, there's no filter, there's no double meaning. She gets orders and she answers those orders without a question."
- Ayelet Zurer as Lara Lor-Van:
  Kal-El's biological mother and loyal wife to Jor-El. Julia Ormond had previously been announced as cast, but dropped out. Connie Nielsen was in negotiations for the role before Zurer was cast. Nielsen was subsequently cast as Queen Hippolyta in Wonder Woman.
- Christopher Meloni as Col. Nathan Hardy:
  A United States Air Force officer, call sign "Guardian", assigned to the United States Northern Command.
- Russell Crowe as Jor-El:
  A Kryptonian scientist who is Kal-El's biological father. Sean Penn and Clive Owen were also considered for the role. Crowe incorporates how his own fatherhood informed his reading of the script to portray Jor-El, stating that "... it was one of those things where that's how it was connecting me. That's the question that Jor-El faces, that's the situation that he's in." Crowe also comments on his preparation for the film stating that: "When I signed on ... well, one, I didn't realize that I would be wearing Spandex—'cause you know that's Superman's costume—I didn't realize that I'd have to fit into it as well," Crowe said. "But, I also didn't realize the type of organiser that Zack Snyder is, 'cause this was really old-school prep. This is sort of David Lean-level preparation, and I really appreciated him. And I was on the movie for three and a half or four months before I even got in front of the camera."

Additionally, Harry Lennix plays Lieutenant General Calvin Swanwick, a United States Army general officer and the deputy commander of United States Northern Command. Christina Wren plays Capt. Carrie Ferris, a United States Air Force officer and the assistant to General Swanwick. Richard Schiff plays Dr. Emil Hamilton, a scientist who works with the United States Armed Forces for DARPA. Carla Gugino portrays the voice of Kelor, the Kryptonian AI service-robot. Mackenzie Gray plays Jax-Ur, a Kryptonian scientist who is one of General Zod's followers. Michael Kelly plays Steve Lombard, an employee of the Daily Planet, and Rebecca Buller plays Jenny Jurwich, an intern of the Daily Planet. Jadin Gould, Rowen Kahn, and Jack Foley, respectively, play Lana Lang, Kenny Braverman, and Pete Ross, classmates of Clark Kent in high school. Joseph Cranford portrays Ross as an adult. Richard Cetrone, Samantha Jo, Revard Dufresne and Apollonia Vanova, respectively, play Tor-An, Car-Vex, Dev-Em II and Nadira, Kryptonian soldiers that follow General Zod.

== Production ==
=== Development ===
In June 2008, Warner Bros. took pitches from comic book writers, screenwriters and directors on how to successfully reboot the Superman film series. Comic book writers Grant Morrison, Mark Waid, Geoff Johns and Brad Meltzer were among those who pitched their ideas for a reboot: "I told them, it's not that bad. Just treat Superman Returns as the Ang Lee Hulk", Morrison said. Waid said: "The Incredible Hulk has proven the audience will forgive you and let you redo the franchise". Morrison's idea was similar to his work on All-Star Superman, while Waid's was akin to Superman: Birthright. Mark Millar, teaming with director Matthew Vaughn, also planned an epic eight-hour Superman trilogy, each installment released a year apart, similar to The Lord of the Rings. Millar compared it to The Godfather trilogy, in which it would chronicle the entire life of Superman, from the early days of Krypton, where little Kal-El witnesses his father's tireless struggle to save the planet, to the finale where Superman loses his powers as the Sun starts to go supernova. According to Millar, Vaughn suggested his Stardust actor Charlie Cox as a Golden-Age inspired Superman "when he was a bit more of a regular person". Vaughn would later say his pitch for a trilogy film would have been to a similar tone to Richard Donner's 1978 film, and would have included villains such as Zod, Brainiac, and Lex Luthor.

In August 2008, Warner Bros. suggested that the planned sequel to Superman Returns, subtitled Man of Steel by director Bryan Singer, would now be a reboot of the film series. Studio executive Jeff Robinov planned to have the film released either by 2010 or 2011, explaining that "Superman Returns didn't quite work as a film in the way that we wanted it to. It didn't position the character the way he needed to be positioned. Had Superman worked in 2006, we would have had a movie for Christmas of this year or 2009. Now the plan is just to reintroduce Superman without regard to a Batman and Superman movie at all." Paul Levitz stated in an interview that Batman holds the key to the Superman reboot. He elaborated: "Everyone is waiting for [Christopher Nolan] to sign on for another Batman, once that happens, the release date for Superman and all other future projects will follow." In February 2009, McG, who previously planned to direct Superman: Flyby, expressed interest in returning to the Superman franchise. August 2009 saw a court ruling in which Jerry Siegel's family recaptured 50% of the rights to Superman's origins and Siegel's share of the copyright in Action Comics #1. In addition, a judge ruled that Warner Bros. did not owe the families additional royalties from previous films. However, if they did not begin production on a Superman film by 2011, then the Siegel estate would have been able to sue for lost revenue on an unproduced film.

He basically told me, 'I have this thought about how you would approach Superman', I immediately got it, loved it and thought: That is a way of approaching the story I've never seen before that makes it incredibly exciting. I wanted to get Emma Thomas and I involved in shepherding the project right away and getting it to the studio and getting it going in an exciting way.

— Christopher Nolan, recalling the moment when Goyer presented the idea of a modernized Superman.

During story discussions for The Dark Knight Rises in 2008, David S. Goyer told Nolan his idea regarding how to present Superman in a modern context. Impressed with Goyer's concept, Nolan pitched the idea to the studio, who hired Nolan to produce and Goyer to write based on the financial and critical success of The Dark Knight. Nolan admired Singer's work on Superman Returns for its connection to Richard Donner's version, stating that "a lot of people have approached Superman in a lot of different ways. I only know the way that has worked for us that's what I know how to do", emphasizing the idea that Batman exists in a world where he is the only superhero and a similar approach to Superman would assure the integrity needed for the new film. Nolan, however, clarified that the film would not have any relationship with the previous Superman film series, in which he commented: "Each serves to the internal logic of the story. They have nothing to do with each other".

Guillermo del Toro, with whom Goyer worked on Blade II, turned down the director's position on the reboot because of his commitment on a film adaptation of At the Mountains of Madness, while Robert Zemeckis was also approached. Ben Affleck, Darren Aronofsky, Duncan Jones, Jonathan Liebesman, Matt Reeves (who would later direct a Batman reboot), and Tony Scott were considered as potential directors.

Zack Snyder was hired as director in October 2010, while casting began the following November. In the original script Zod was going to be sucked into the Phantom Zone, but Snyder and Goyer felt it was unsatisfying so they asked DC Comics if Superman would kill someone if he didn't have a choice. Nolan was against this approach, leading Goyer to come up with the scene with the heat vision and putting people in imminent danger and this convinced Nolan. Robinov spoke to Entertainment Weekly and allowed a peek over the wall of secrecy surrounding Warner Bros.' DC plans: "It's setting the tone for what the movies are going to be like going forward. In that, it's definitely a first step." Plans included for the film to contain references to the existence of other superheroes, alluding to the possibility of a further DC Universe, and setting the tone for a shared fictional universe of DC Comics characters on film. Snyder confirmed both Booster Gold and Batman references in the film. When Zod destroys a satellite, the words "Wayne Enterprises" are scrolled on the satellite. Snyder and Nolan considered having Man of Steel share continuity with The Dark Knight trilogy, but ultimately decided against it.

The film's storyboard was created by storyboard artist Jay Oliva, in his first live-action feature film project, along with Snyder. Oliva has cited the Japanese anime shows Dragon Ball Z and Birdy the Mighty as an inspiration for the film's epic battle scenes. During the film's brainstorming, Oliva pitched the idea as "I could come up with something I've never seen in live-action American cinema and only in anime".

=== Filming ===
Principal photography began on August 1, 2011, at an industrial park near DuPage Airport under the codename "Autumn Frost". Zack Snyder expressed reluctance to shoot the film in 3D due to the technical limitations of the format and instead chose to shoot in 2D and convert the film into 3D in post-production, for a 2D, 3D, RealD 3D, IMAX 3D and 4DX release. Snyder also chose to shoot on film instead of digitally because he felt it would make the film "a big movie experience". Cinematographer Amir Mokri shot the film with Panavision Panaflex Millennium XL2 cameras and C-Series anamorphic lenses. Filming was expected to last for two to three months. Production took place in Plano, Illinois on August 22 to 29. According to an interview with Michael Shannon, filming would continue until February 2012.

Man of Steel filmed in the Chicago area, California, and Burnaby's Mammoth Studios in Vancouver, which was used as a set for Krypton and the extraterrestrial aircraft portrayed in the film. Vancouver's North Shore waterfront area was also used for the oil rig rescue scene where Superman is first introduced. Ucluelet and Nanaimo, British Columbia, feature prominently in the film's first hour—the trademark winter mist and rough seas are passed off as Alaska in the film. Filming took place in the Chicago Loop from September 7 to 17. The Chicago shoot was a unit project, meaning that filming would partake numerous establishing shots as well as cutaways and might not necessarily include principal cast members.

=== Design ===
Man of Steel features a redesigned Superman costume by James Acheson and Michael Wilkinson. The costume preserves the color scheme and "S" logo, but adopts darker tones and notably does not feature the red trunks usually worn by Superman. Zack Snyder said the costume is "a modern aesthetic". He and the producers attempted to devise a suit featuring the red trunks, but could not design one that fit into the tone of the film, leading to their removal from the suit. Because of Wilkinson's unavailability, Snyder chose Acheson to design the suit; however, he only started developing it, and Wilkinson finished the development when he returned, and designed the other character's costumes as well. Due to the substantial weight a practical suit would yield, the Kryptonian armor for General Zod was constructed through CGI to allow Shannon "freedom of movement". In a March 2014 interview with Esquire, Wilkinson explained the reason for the look of Superman's redesigned suit:

A lot of the efforts we took in the film were to explain why the suit looks the way it does. We didn't want it to be a random, ornamental decision. We start the film on the planet of Krypton, which is where the suit comes from, and we go to great pains to show the suit fitting into the culture. All of the people you see on Krypton are wearing this chainmail-like suit, with the same detailing as the Superman suit. Everyone has their family crests on their chests. The cuff and the boot details are shared through all of the different characters we meet on Krypton. So by the time we see Superman in his suit we understand why it looks the way it looks.

=== Visual effects ===
John "DJ" Desjardin served as the visual supervisor for Man of Steel, with Weta Digital, Moving Picture Company (MPC) and Double Negative providing the visual effects for the film. Zack Snyder wanted the film to "appear very natural because there's some very fantastical things in there and he wanted people to suspend their disbelief, and we the visual effects team had to make it as easy as possible for them to do so." Desjardin noted that the intent in shooting the film was to use handheld devices to make the film feel like a "documentary-style" film. Desjardin said: "We had to think about what that would mean, since we also had to photograph some crazy action. So for a lot of the previs we did, we'd start to think where our cameras were and where our cameraman was. A lot of the rules are the Battlestar Galactica rules for the space cams that Gary Hurtzel [sic] developed for that miniseries, where we want to make sure if we're translating the camera at all it makes sense unless the action is so over the top, like in the end where Superman is beating up Zod, we had to break it a bit."

Alien-like planet landscapes, creatures, and architecture were created by Weta Digital to further enhance the worldbuilding process of planet Krypton.

For the first act of the film taking place on the planet Krypton, Weta Digital placed alien-like planet environments, creatures, and the principal means of display—a technology the filmmakers called "liquid geometry". Weta Digital visual effects supervisor Dan Lemmon explained that "it's a bunch of silver beads that are suspended through a magnetic field, and the machine is able to control that magnetic field so that the collection of beads behave almost like three-dimensional pixels, and they can create a surface that floats in the air and describes whatever the thing is you're supposed to be seeing." The beads of the display, which up close would appear to be pyramids with a slight bevel, were designed to create a surface of the object to depict inside a "console-like" figure.

In the modeling and animation aspect of the liquid geometry, Brian Goodwin, the lead effects technical director of Weta Digital, explained: "We had to develop a pipeline to bring in assets, so instead of going through the route of reducing the polygon count to something usable what we would then do—you would take the model in whatever way it was made and just scatter discrete points onto it, and extract the matrix onto the animation and copy these points onto the matrix and have these sparse points behaving in a way that the model would." After the animation, artists duplicated the beads onto the animated geometry for a pre-simulated lighting version to get approval on how the object would read. Sims were then run "on all the targets which would be discrete beads floating around on top of the surface which would have its own set of parameters", in which Goodwin further explained: "The bead size or the turbulence that would crawl along the surface constantly updating the orientation was based on the normal provided by the surface. That was then saved to disk and we would use that sim as the final target for the simulation." After the simulation process, Weta Digital ran every bead through a temporal filter to remove jitter to control the noise. Lighting solutions directly worked on the set. Weta used RenderMan to take advantage of improved ray tracing and instancing objects.

The sequences where Superman uses close-combat fight scenes with the other Kryptonians proved to be a major challenge for the filmmakers and the visual effects crew. Desjardin explained: "When we do these fights and these hyper-real things, we don't want to do the traditional, 'OK I'm a cameraman, I'm shooting a clean plate, I'm going to pan over here to follow the action that's not really there yet but we'll put the action in later. Because that's us animating the characters to the camera. So we would do that animation with the characters—grappling, punching, or flying away—and we would take the real guys up until the point until they were supposed to do that and we'd cut. Then we'd put an environment camera there and take the environment. And then a camera for reference of the actors and get each moment. So then we had a set of high-res stills for the environment and the characters. Then, in post, we take the digi-doubles and animate them according to the speeds we want them to move in our digital environment."

MPC handled the visual effects for the "Smallville encounter" sequence. Before providing the visual effects, the shots were previsualized for the fight choreography. After the previsualizations, live action portions of the scene would be filmed in small pieces: "If say Superman was being punched and would land 50 meters away, we would shoot our start position and end position, and then bridge that gap with the CGI takeovers", says Guillaume Rocheron, the MPC visual effects supervisor. A camera rig would then obtain key frames of the choreographed actor; Desjardin said "it's a six-still camera rig that's built on a pipe rig so that you can run it in at the end of a setup and get stills of key frames of a performance or an expression, and then we could use those hi-res stills to project onto the CGI double and get really accurate transition lighting and color—right from the set."

On set, a camera rig was used to capture the environment of the sequence. Dubbed "enviro-cam", the visual effects crew would mount a Canon EOS 5D and a motorized nodal head, allowing the crew to capture the environment at a 360-degree angle with 55K resolution for every shot, the process would take approximately two to four minutes. The set capture resulted in lighting and textures that could be reprojected onto geometry. Full-screen digital doubles were a major component for the fighting sequences. Digital armor was also added, along with the energy-based Kryptonian helmets. Cyberscan and FACS were conducted with the actors, and polarized and non-polarized reference photos were taken. Superman's cape and costume were scanned in high detail—the cape in particular became a direct extension of Superman's actions.

For the sequences involving the xenoforming of the city Metropolis, Double Negative handled the visual effects for the sequence. To construct a Metropolis that seemed convincing and realistic, Double Negative used Esri's CityEngine to help procedurally deliver the city. According to Ged Wright, a Double Negative visual effects supervisor, it was a much more sci-fi based role, "so we took what they had done and extended it a great deal. The work we were doing was based around the Downtowns for New York City, L.A. and Chicago, and that gave us the building volumes for heights. We'd skin those volumes with kit parts, but most of it then had to fall down! So we had to rig it for destruction and use it for other aspects of the work as well."

For the destruction of the buildings, the studio rewrote its own asset system to focus towards its dynamic events. The Bullet physics software was a heavily impacted component for the use of the destruction. Wright said that "we wanted to be able to run an RBD event and trigger all these secondary events, whether it was glass or dust simulations—all of those things needed to be chained up and handled in a procedural way. One of the advantages of this was that, because it was all based around a limited number of input components, you can make sure they're modeled in a way they're usable in effects—you can model something but they'll be another stage to rig it for destruction." Fire, smoke, and water stimulation tools were developed at the Double Negative studio. The studio transitioned between the existing proprietary volume rendering software to rendering in Mantra for elements such as fireball sims. Double Negative also used the in-house fluids tool "Squirt" to handle larger-scale sims and interaction for more tightly coupled volumes and particles. Regarding the battle between Superman and Zod, Double Negative implemented real photography onto its digital doubles.

== Music ==
Hans Zimmer initially denied popular rumors that he would be composing the film's score, but in June 2012, it was confirmed that Zimmer would, in fact, be doing so after all. To completely distinguish Man of Steel from the previous films, the iconic "Superman March" by John Williams was not used. Hans Zimmer's soundtrack for Man of Steel was released publicly on June 11, 2013. An unofficial rip of the musical score from the third trailer, entitled "An Ideal of Hope", confirmed to be a cut-down version of the track "What Are You Going to Do When You Are Not Saving the World?", was released on April 19. In late April, the official track listing of the two-CD deluxe edition was revealed.

== Themes ==
Many reviewers interpreted Man of Steel as a religious allegory, especially since Warner Bros. set up a website that contains "a nine-page pamphlet entitled Jesus: The Original Superhero". Justin Craig compares Kal-El's struggle to the Passion of Christ, stating that "Kal-El is more than willing to sacrifice himself to save the people of Earth. Originally reluctant to reveal his identity and powers to the world, Superman decides to turn himself over to Zod to save humanity from annihilation." Craig also states that there is an allegory to the Trinity within Man of Steel: "Jor-El returns to Kal-El on Earth as a ghost, guiding his budding superhero son on his journey to salvation. Before Jor-El sends his son off to Earth baby Moses-style, he tells his wife that, like Jesus, 'He'll be a god to them.'" Paul Asay of The Washington Post writes that "Superman floats in space with his arms splayed out as if nailed to an invisible cross," a fact that Craig also mentioned in his assessment of the film. The protagonist of the film is also 33 years old and seeks "counsel at a church."

Writing for The Huffington Post, Colin Liotta compared Zod to Adolf Hitler, citing: "He feels his vision for a pure Krypton (i.e. a society like the one Hitler envisioned with his eugenics program) is the only answer for survival." The sequence where a young Clark's powers overwhelm him in grade school, leading to him shutting himself in a closet, has led many to speculate that DC Extended Universe Superman is either autistic or meant to represent the struggles of autism.

== Marketing ==
Warner Bros. and DC Comics won the rights to the domain name manofsteel.com, in use by a member of the public, for use for the film's official website. On November 20, 2012, for the release of The Dark Knight Rises DVD and Blu-ray, Warner Bros. launched a countdown on the film's website where fans could share the countdown on websites like Facebook or Twitter to unlock an "exclusive reward". On December 3, 2012, the "exclusive reward" was revealed to be an official Man of Steel teaser poster. The poster, which depicts Superman being arrested, generated a positive response and much speculation about the film's story. On December 10, 2012, a website appeared at dsrwproject.com that provided audio signals to be decoded by viewers. It was discovered to be related to the film due to the copyright on the website. By December 11, 2012, the decoded message led readers to another website with a countdown that led to the public release of the trailer. In anticipation of the film, Mattel unveiled a toy line which includes Movie Masters action figures. In addition, Lego released three Man of Steel sets, inspired by scenes from the film; Rubie's Costume Co. also released a new line of Man of Steel-inspired costumes and accessories for both kids and adults. The film has reportedly earned over $160 million from promotional tie-ins.

Viral marketing campaigns for the film began when the official website was replaced by "deep space radio waves". The message was decoded to reveal a voice that said "You Are Not Alone". The official site continued to be updated with new static files that slowly revealed the symbol for the film's villain, General Zod. Shortly after, the website was replaced with a "message" from Zod, who requested that Earth must return Kal-El to his custody and told Kal-El to surrender within 24 hours or the world would suffer the consequences. A viral site called "IWillFindHim.com" was released that showed a countdown to the third trailer for the film.

Warner Bros. enlisted Christian-based marketing firm Grace Hill Media to help spread the Christian themes of the film to the religious demographics. Special trailers were created outlining the religious tones, due to Hollywood studios frequently marketing movies to specific religious and cultural groups. Warner Bros. previously marketed films such as The Blind Side, The Notebook, The Book of Eli and the Harry Potter series to faith-based groups. Warner Bros. also asked Professor Craig Detweiler of Pepperdine University to "create a Superman-centric sermon outline for pastors titled Jesus: The Original Superhero." Regarding this, Paul Asay of The Washington Post wrote that "the religious themes keep coming: Free will. Sacrifice. God-given purpose. Man of Steel isn't just a movie. It's a Bible study in a cape. The messages are so strong that its marketers been [sic] explicitly pushing the film to Christian audiences."

== Release ==
Man of Steel held a red carpet premiere at the Lincoln Center's Alice Tully Hall in New York City on June 10, 2013, which featured the attendance of the principal cast members. The film received a wide release on June 14, 2013. The film was originally slated for release in December 2012, but it was pushed to the June 14, 2013, date to avoid competition with Warner Bros.' other film The Hobbit: An Unexpected Journey, which was released on December 14, 2012. It was released as a single-disc DVD (feature film only), on two-disc DVD with bonus features, and respective Blu-ray and Blu-ray 3D combo packs on November 12, 2013, and in the United Kingdom on December 2, 2013. As of January 2019, Man of Steel has sold more than 2.3 million DVDs along with an estimated 3.3 million Blu-ray Discs totaling $44.4 million and $76.2 million, respectively, for a total of $120.7 million in sales. The film was later released in 4K Ultra HD Blu-ray format on July 19, 2016.

== Reception ==
=== Box office ===
Man of Steel grossed $291 million in the United States and Canada, and $379.1 million in other territories, for a worldwide total of $670.1 million, making it the highest-grossing solo Superman film of all time and the second-highest when adjusting for inflation. It is also the second-highest-grossing reboot of all time behind The Amazing Spider-Man. Deadline Hollywood calculated the film's net profit as $42.7 million, when factoring together all expenses and revenues, making it the ninth most profitable release of 2013. The film earned $128.7 million on its opening weekend, including $17.5 million from IMAX theaters, making it the biggest of such openings for a standalone Superman film. Man of Steel earned an additional $120 million from DVD and Blu-ray sales.

Man of Steel made $12 million from a Thursday night Walmart screening program, and an additional $9 million from midnight shows. This marked Warner Bros.' third-highest advance night/midnight opening, and the biggest advance night/midnight debut for a non-sequel. The film eventually earned $44 million during its opening Friday (including midnight grosses) and $56.1 million when the Thursday night showings are included. The opening-day gross was the second-highest for a non-sequel, and the 20th-largest overall. Its opening weekend gross of $116.6 million was the third-highest of 2013, behind Iron Man 3 ($174.1 million) and The Hunger Games: Catching Fire ($158.1 million), and the third-highest among non-sequels, behind Marvel's The Avengers ($207.4 million) and The Hunger Games ($152.5 million). It also broke Toy Story 3's record ($110.3 million) for the highest weekend debut in June (the record was again broken two years later by Jurassic World's opening gross of $208.8 million). However, on its second weekend, Man of Steel's box office fell almost 65%–68% if the Thursday night gross is included—putting it in third place, behind Monsters University and World War Z. Box Office Mojo called it an "abnormally large drop," close to the second-weekend decline for Green Lantern.

Man of Steel earned $73.3 million on its opening weekend from 24 countries, which includes $4.2 million from 79 IMAX theaters, setting a June opening-weekend record for IMAX. The film set an opening-day record in the Philippines with $1.66 million. In the United Kingdom, Ireland and Malta, the film earned $5.6 million on its opening day and £11.2 million ($17.47 million) on its opening weekend. Its biggest opener outside the United States was in China, with $25.9 million in four days (Thursday to Sunday). In total earnings, its three largest countries after North America are China ($63.4 million), the United Kingdom, Ireland and Malta ($46.2 million) and Australia ($22.3 million).

=== Critical response ===
On review aggregator Rotten Tomatoes the film has an approval rating of 56% based on 340 reviews and an average rating of 6.2/10. The site's consensus reads, "Man of Steel's exhilarating action and spectacle can't fully overcome its detours into generic blockbuster territory." On Metacritic, the film received a weighted score of 55 out of 100 based on 47 critics, indicating "mixed or average" reviews. Audience polls in North America from CinemaScore for the film tallied an average grade of an "A−" on an A+ to F scale, with those under the age of 18 and older than 50 giving it an "A".

Richard Roeper of the Chicago Sun-Times said that Man of Steel covered no new ground with regard to Superman films, and instead, "we're plunged back into a mostly-underwhelming film, with underdeveloped characters and supercharged-fight scenes that drag on and offer nothing new in the way of special-effects creativity". The Boston Globe's Ty Burr wrote, "What's missing from this Superman saga is a sense of lightness, of pop joy". The Washington Post's Ann Hornaday stated that with "Hans Zimmer's turgid, over-produced score", the film "is an exceptionally unpleasant viewing experience". For The Denver Post's Lisa Kennedy, the chief problem with Man of Steel is the "rhythm and balance in the storytelling and directing" which resulted in a film that swings "between destructive overstatement and flat-footed homilies."

Kofi Outlaw, Editor-in-Chief at Screen Rant, gave Man of Steel a 4-out-of-5-star review, stating that "Man of Steel has more than earned its keep, and deserves to be THE iconic Superman movie for a whole new generation". He would go on to name Man of Steel the best superhero movie of 2013. Jim Vejvoda of IGN gave Man of Steel a 9 out of 10 while praising the action sequences and the performances of Kevin Costner, Russell Crowe and Michael Shannon. The performance of Antje Traue as Superman's adversary Faora-Ul, particularly in the Smallville battle scenes, has also been lauded. Peter Travers of Rolling Stone gave it 3 stars out of 4, saying, "Caught in the slipstream between action and angst, Man of Steel is a bumpy ride for sure. But there's no way to stay blind to its wonders." Todd McCarthy of The Hollywood Reporter said rebooting the franchise was unnecessary, but that the film was confident enough and Snyder's attention to detail careful enough that audiences could overlook another reboot. PopMatters journalist J.C. Maçek III, wrote, "The path of this flawed savior isn't quite the one that we have been led to expect and many fans will love that and many fans will decry its comic book-divergent choices. On the other hand, barring Lois Lane's own knowledge of the dual nature of Clark and Superman (thus depriving one of fiction's greatest reveals), the hero we see in the final moments of Man of Steel is nothing if not the character Jerry Siegel and Joe Shuster created ... with just a bit more in the 'imperfections' column." Steve Persall of the Tampa Bay Times stated that, "Man of Steel is more than just Avengers-sized escapism; it's an artistic introduction to a movie superhero we only thought we knew." Time magazine's Richard Corliss said, "The movie finds its true, lofty footing not when it displays Kal-El's extraordinary powers, but when it dramatizes Clark Kent's roiling humanity. The super part of Man of Steel is just okay, but the man part is super." In a review on Roger Ebert's website, Matt Zoller Seitz awarded the film three out of four stars, calling it an "astonishing movie" and praising the conflict between Clark and Zod. But he criticized the film for not having more personal and intimate moments between Clark and Lois. In 2014, Empire ranked Man of Steel the 286th-greatest film ever made on their list of "The 301 Greatest Movies Of All Time" as voted by the magazine's readers.

Speaking to Fox Business Channel, Grae Drake, senior editor of Rotten Tomatoes, expressed dismay over the critical reception, stating, "As much as I love and respect our critics at Rotten Tomatoes, I've got to say I am shocked. Listen, the movie's not perfect but ... I just cannot fathom it. It was a good movie, you guys."

Reaction to the film among comics creators was mixed. Those who enjoyed it include Jeff Parker, Heidi MacDonald, Ethan Van Sciver, Christos Gage and former Superman writer Dan Jurgens. Among its detractors were Joe Keatinge, Sean McKeever, Gabriel Hardman and Mark Waid. MacDonald praised the film's action, drama and leads Henry Cavill and Amy Adams. Van Sciver singled out Cavill in particular for praise. Gage called it the best Superman film since 1980's Superman II. Hardman said that he liked a lot of the mechanics but did not connect with the characters, which robbed the story of tension. Waid, who wrote the origin miniseries Superman: Birthright, criticized the film for its overall "joyless" tone, and for Superman's decision to kill Zod, a criticism echoed by other creators. Writer Grant Morrison, who wrote the critically acclaimed miniseries All-Star Superman, expressed mixed reaction to the film, saying that while they "kinda liked it and kinda didn't", it did not present anything new, as they would have preferred a "second act" type story with Lex Luthor instead of re-establishing the character by presenting information Morrison is already familiar with. Morrison also questioned the need for a superhero to kill, as did artist Neal Adams. Adams suggested that other alternatives were open to Superman when Zod threatened innocent people with his heat vision, such as covering his eyes. He also criticized Superman for not moving the battle away from Metropolis as the character did at the end of Superman II. Jim Lee had a positive opinion: "It's epic. It's got a lot of heart, but one of the things that was kind of missing from the last Superman movie I think was the action, and this movie has it in spades. I mean it is a visual thrill ride. It is amazing. You get to see all the powers of Superman, and in all its glory, and I think people are going to be blown away."

=== Accolades ===
Award	Date of ceremony	Category	Recipient(s)	Result	Ref.
Annie Awards	February 1, 2014	Outstanding Animated Effects - Live Action	Jonathan Paquin, Brian Goodwin, Gray Horsfield, Mathieu Chardonnet, Adrien Toupet	Nominated	
British Academy Children's Awards	November 25, 2013	BAFTA Kids' Vote – Feature Film	Man of Steel	Nominated	
Critics' Choice Awards	January 16, 2014	Best Actor in an Action Movie	Henry Cavill	Nominated	
Golden Trailer Awards	May 3, 2013	Summer 2013 Blockbuster Trailer	Man of Steel	Nominated	
Golden Trailer Awards	May 3, 2013	Best Summer 2013 Blockbuster Poster	Man of Steel	Won	
Golden Trailer Awards	May 3, 2013	Best Teaser Poster	Man of Steel	Nominated	
Golden Trailer Awards	May 30, 2014	Best Wildposts	Man of Steel	Nominated	
Houston Film Critics Society	December 15, 2013	Best Original Score	Hans Zimmer	Nominated	
NewNowNext Awards	June 17, 2013	Cause You're Hot	Henry Cavill	Nominated	
NewNowNext Awards	June 17, 2013	Next Must-See Movie	Man of Steel	Won	
MTV Movie Awards	April 13, 2014	Best Hero	Henry Cavill	Won	
People's Choice Awards	January 8, 2014	Favorite Dramatic Actress	Amy Adams	Nominated	
Saturn Awards	June 26, 2014	Best Comic-to-Film Motion Picture	Man of Steel	Nominated	
Saturn Awards	June 26, 2014	Best Performance by a Younger Actor	Dylan Sprayberry	Nominated	
Saturn Awards	June 26, 2014	Best Special Effects	Joe Letteri, John "DJ" Desjardin, Dan Lemmon	Nominated	
Teen Choice Awards	August 13, 2013	Choice Movie: Liplock	Henry Cavill and Amy Adams	Nominated	
Teen Choice Awards	August 13, 2013	Choice Summer Movie: Action	Man of Steel	Nominated	
Teen Choice Awards	August 13, 2013	Choice Summer Movie Star: Male	Henry Cavill	Nominated	
Teen Choice Awards	August 13, 2013	Choice Summer Movie Star: Female	Amy Adams	Nominated	
Visual Effects Society	February 12, 2014	Outstanding Virtual Cinematography in a Live Action Feature Motion Picture	Daniel Paulsson, Edmund Kolloen, Joel Prager, David Stripinis	Nominated	
Visual Effects Society	February 12, 2014	Outstanding FX and Simulation Animation in a Live Action Feature Motion Picture	Brian Goodwin, Gray Horsfield, Mathieu Chardonnet, Adrien Toupet	Nominated	

== Future ==
=== DC Extended Universe ===
Warner Bros. began planning a cinematic universe featuring other DC Comics characters following the release of Man of Steel. In June 2013, Goyer was hired to write the film's sequel, along with the script for Justice League. Zack Snyder revealed at San Diego Comic-Con the following month that Superman and Batman would appear in the sequel to Man of Steel, with Cavill, Adams, Lane and Fishburne set to reprise their roles. The film's title, Batman v Superman: Dawn of Justice, was revealed in May 2014, and it was theatrically released on March 25, 2016.

=== Cancelled sequel ===
A full slate of upcoming DC Comics-based films was announced by Warner Bros. Pictures in October 2014. The company also confirmed that a Superman film was in development, with Henry Cavill set to reprise his lead role. Zack Snyder contemplated the inclusion of Brainiac, the Kryptonians, and even Metallo as possible antagonists for the sequel, but they were ultimately scrapped by April 2013 in favor of a plot with Batman as the antagonist. The film, Batman v Superman: Dawn of Justice, was released in 2016.

In August 2016, TheWrap reported that a sequel to Man of Steel had entered active development. Cavill's manager, Dany Garcia, confirmed that the actor would be involved. The screenplay was still being developed that November according to Amy Adams. Matthew Vaughn was Warner Bros.' top choice to direct the film as of March 2017. Vaughn previously pitched an idea for a new Superman trilogy with comic book writer Mark Millar prior to the development of Man of Steel, in which the destruction of Krypton would take place after Superman had already grown-up on the planet. The troubled production and lackluster box office earnings of Justice League (2017) led to a shake-up at Warner Bros., as the studio chose to rethink its approach to future DC projects. By late 2017, the script for a Man of Steel sequel was still incomplete according to Justice League producer Charles Roven.

In July 2018, prior to the release of Mission: Impossible – Fallout, director Christopher McQuarrie and co-star Cavill pitched their take on a new Superman film, but Warner Bros. did not pursue the idea. James Gunn was approached later that year to write and direct a Superman film, but he chose instead to move forward with The Suicide Squad (2021). Following contract issues with Cavill's scheduled cameo appearance in Shazam! (2019), as well as scheduling conflicts with his Fallout commitment, it was reported that the actor may be parting ways with the studio. In November 2019, however, Cavill maintained that he still had interest in reprising his role. Warner Bros. remained unsure of the direction the character was heading and was in contact with "high-profile talent", including J. J. Abrams and Michael B. Jordan, with the latter pitching a Black version of the character. Development on a Man of Steel sequel was abandoned by May 2020, though Cavill remained in talks to appear in a future DC film.

=== Reboot ===
Warner Bros. revealed in October 2022 that a sequel to Man of Steel was being revisited, with Roven serving as a producer and Cavill reprising his role. The studio was still searching for writers, and McQuarrie was still on a list of possible directors. Cavill then appeared in the post-credits scene of the DCEU film Black Adam (2022), and the potential for his return in future projects became more favorable. Shortly after, Cavill's return as Superman in a future film was officially confirmed. Steven Knight had written a script treatment around that time, which reportedly included Brainiac as the antagonist. However, there was a lack of interest in the script by Warner Bros. executives. The following month, TheWrap reported that newly-appointed co-chairmen and co-CEOs of DC Studios James Gunn and Peter Safran were developing new plans for the DC Universe. Gunn later revealed in December 2022 that the next Superman film would not include Cavill and would instead focus on a younger Superman. In early 2023, James Gunn provided details about Superman: Legacy, which will be the cornerstone of his new DC Universe. The film, released on July 11, 2025, is not an origin story for the character. Gunn emphasized that the movie would focus on Superman balancing his Kryptonian heritage with his human upbringing, portraying him as the embodiment of "truth, justice, and the American way" in a world that sometimes sees kindness as outdated. Gunn described Superman as a symbol of hope, embodying optimism and compassion in contrast to the darker tones that have sometimes defined superhero films. Cavill's cameo in Black Adam was his final appearance as Superman. Gunn later clarified he had never intended to cast Cavill in his new film and referred to the previous one-off cameo, that came to before he and Safran took over DC Studios, as "the end of his story".

In 2025, in an interview promoting Mission: Impossible – The Final Reckoning, McQuarrie, who had previously partnered with Cavill to pitch a sequel to Man of Steel in July 2018, revealed brief details of his script and take on the movie. He hailed it as a good script and an excellent story that Warner Bros rejected. Despite this, he revealed the door was still open for projects that didn't come to fruition and that he was open to reuniting with Cavill to pitch the movie again if the opportunity was presented in the future.

== See also ==
- List of films featuring extraterrestrials

== Bibliography ==
- Marrapodi, Eric. "Superman: Flying to a church near you ". CNN. June 14, 2013.
- Greg Cox (writer): Man of Steel (2013), ISBN 9781781165997 (Novelization)
