= Iantha Richardson =

American actress (born 1990)

- Born: June 16, 1990 (age 35); Washington, D.C., United States
- Occupation: Actress
- Years active: 2014–present

Iantha Richardson is an American actress. She is best known for playing Faith Mitchell in the police procedural series Will Trent and Tessa Lorraine in the drama series American Soul.

== Early life ==
Richardson was born in Washington, D.C. on June 16 1990.She attended Baltimore School for the Arts. She graduated from Fordham University with a B.F.A in Dance and African American Studies.

== Career ==
Early in her career she made appearances in small shows such Jones and Journey of a Goddess before getting her first recurring role of Tess in the drama series This is Us. Her first big role came playing Tessa Lorraine in the drama series American Soul. Her biggest role so far has been playing Faith Mitchell in the police procedural series Will Trent. She made her directional debut when directing Episode 409 on the show. She wanted to try directing since 2020 calling it a dream come true.

== Personal life ==
She is also a professional dancer and has performed with the Lula Washington Dance Theatre and The Ailey Company. She has appeared in music videos like M.I.L.F. $ by Fergie.

== Filmography ==
=== Film ===
Year	Title	Role	Notes
2015	Why Are You Single the Stageplay	Brandy	
2017	Truth or Dare	Nurse	
2017	Benny Got Shot	Naomi	Short
2018	Log Off	Leah	Short
2024	Don't Tell Mom the Babysitter's Dead	Caroline	

=== Television ===
Year	Title	Role	Notes
2016	Journey of a Goddess	Krys Pickins	3 episodes
2018–2019	Jones	Ryan Taylor	4 episodes
2019–2020	American Soul	Tessa Lorraine	16 episodes
2021	None of the Above	LeShaun Jordan	Episode: Remember That Foreign Film & That Posting Issue? (Pilot)
2017–2022	This is Us	Adult Tess	10 episodes
2019–2024	Good Trouble	Tolu	9 episodes
2023–present	Will Trent	Faith Mitchell	Main role
